= List of members of the Black Panther Party =

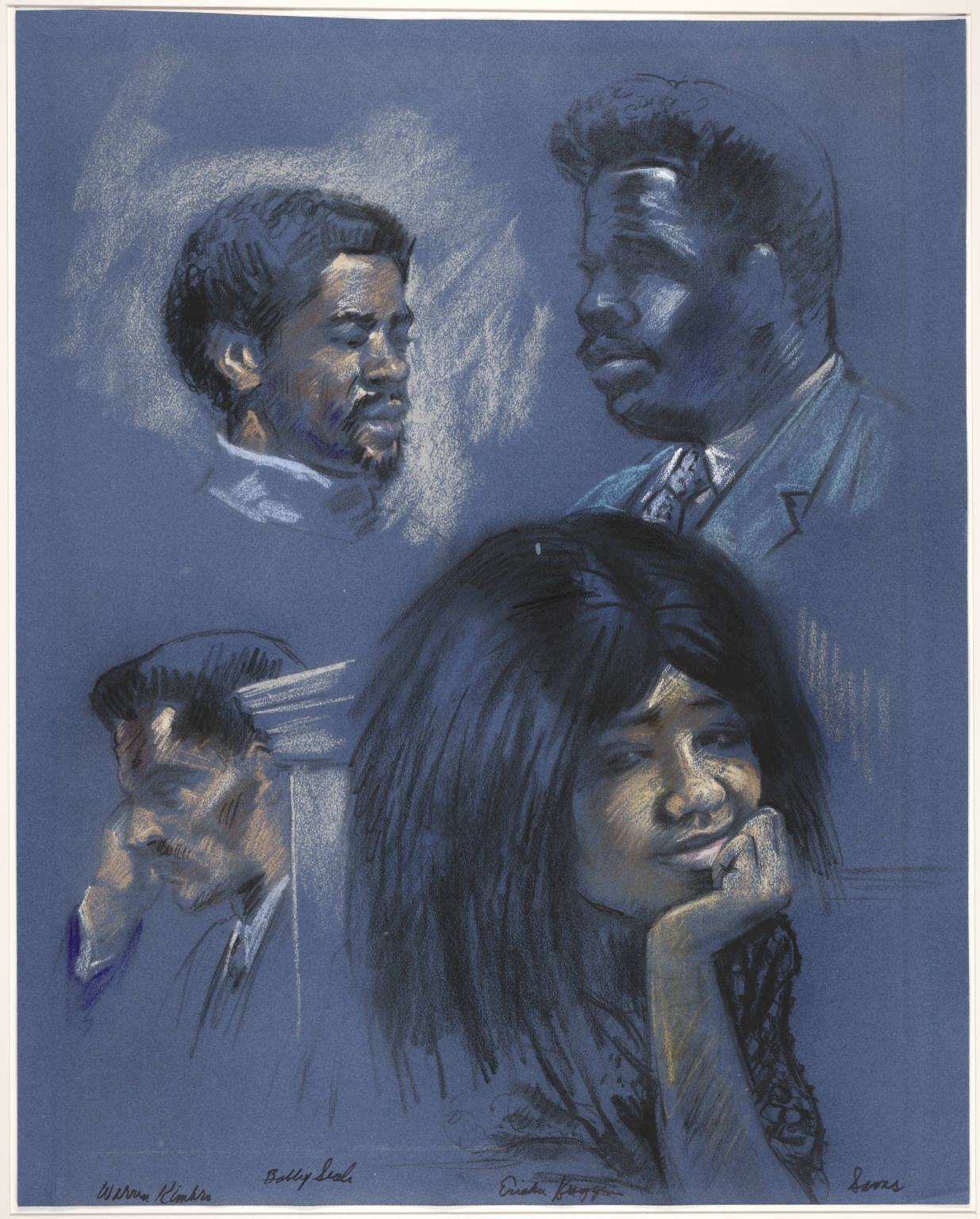
Courtroom sketch of Black Panthers Bobby Seale, George W. Sams, Jr., Warren Kimbro, and Ericka Huggins, during the 1970 New Haven Black Panther trials.

This is an alphabetical referenced list of members of the Black Panther Party, including those notable for being Panthers as well as former Panthers who became notable for other reasons. This list does not include outside supporters, sympathizers, or allies.

- JoNina Abron-Ervin, reporter and editor of The Black Panther.
- Mumia Abu-Jamal, Lieutenant Minister of Information, Philadelphia chapter. In prison for the murder of a police officer.
- Sundiata Acoli, Finance Minister of the Harlem chapter who served 49 years in prison for murdering a New Jersey state trooper, and was released in 2022.
- Ashanti Alston, anarchist activist.
- Richard Aoki, Field Marshal and FBI informant. Committed suicide in 2009.
- Kuwasi Balagoon, former member Harlem chapter and one of the Panther 21.
- Charles Barron former member Harlem chapter, community activist and Democratic New York City Councilmember
- Lucille Berrien, political activist from Milwaukee.
- Dhoruba bin Wahad, New York activist and one of the Panther 21.
- Veronza Bowers, Jr., served 50 years in prison for murdering a park ranger. Released on May 7, 2024.
- William Lee Brent, hijacked a plane to Cuba in 1968, lived in exile there until his death in 2006.
- Elaine Brown, Chairwoman, Minister of Defense (mid 1970s), for a time was a 2008 Green Party presidential candidate.
- H. Rap Brown, Former Student Nonviolent Coordinating Committee leader, Justice Minister, currently serving life sentence for murder.
- Safiya Bukhari, member of Harlem chapter.
- Ed Bullins, Minister of Culture in San Francisco, and renowned playwright.
- Stokely Carmichael, Former Student Nonviolent Coordinating Committee leader and Honorary Prime Minister. He lived in exile in Africa from 1969 until his death in 1998.
- Bunchy Carter, Deputy Minister of Defense, Southern California chapter, killed in 1969.
- Mark Clark, Defense Captain, Illinois chapter, killed by police in 1969.
- Eldridge Cleaver, Minister of Information Died in 1998.
- Kathleen Neal Cleaver, Party spokesperson and law school professor.
- Paul Coates, defense captain of the Baltimore chapter.
- Mark Comfort, community activist.
- Marshall "Eddie" Conway, Minister of Defense of the Baltimore chapter. Served 44 years in prison for the murder of a police officer, until his conviction was overturned.
- Donald L. Cox, Field Marshall of the party. Died in exile in France in 2011.
- Aaron Dixon, community activist, former captain of the Seattle chapter of the Party. Ran with the Green Party for U.S. Senate on his opposition to the Iraq War.
- Emory Douglas, artist, Minister of Culture, and strongly associated with The Black Panther (newspaper).
- B. Kwaku Duren, coordinator of the Southern California chapter from 1976 to 1981
- Barbara Easley-Cox, wife of Donald L. Cox.
- Lorenzo Kom'boa Ervin, anarchist activist.
- Glen Ford, journalist.
- Kent Ford, co founder of Portland chapter.
- Reggie Forte, member of Oakland chapter.
- Larry Gossett, member of Seattle chapter.
- Stanley Greene, photojournalist.
- Bashir Hameed, deputy chairman of Jersey City chapter.
- Fred Hampton, Deputy Chairman, Illinois chapter; killed in a 1969 raid by the Chicago police and the FBI.
- Tim Hayes, founder of Atlanta chapter, writer and community activist.
- David Hilliard, chief of staff, university lecturer and party archivist.
- Raymond Hewitt, civil rights activist.
- Elbert Howard, founding member of the party and first editor of its newspaper, The Black Panther.
- Ericka Huggins, longtime party leader, professor of sociology.
- John Huggins Los Angeles chapter leader. Killed in 1969.
- Bobby Hutton, first party recruit, treasurer; killed by police in 1968.
- George Jackson, author and prison activist. Killed in prison in 1971.
- Jamal Joseph, film professor, author and Oscar nominee.
- Judy Juanita, Author who served as editor of The Black Panther (newspaper).
- Magora Kennedy, LGBT activist.
- Chaka Khan, former member of the Chicago chapter, and singer who has won ten Grammy awards.
- Warren Kimbro, convicted in the murder of Alex Rackley, prisoner rehabilitation activist; died in 2009.
- Robert Hillary King, author, lecturer and former member of the Angola Prison Chapter
- Art Lassiter, musician.
- Joan Tarika Lewis, graphic artist associated with the newspaper The Black Panther and the first woman to join the party.
- Connie Matthews, International Coordinator of the BPP.
- Lonnie McLucas, Bridgeport, Connecticut member convicted in the murder of Alex Rackley.
- Huey P. Newton, Minister of Defense, co-founder. Killed in 1989.
- Kojo Nnamdi, radio host who was a member from 1968 to 1969 in Brooklyn.
- Jalil Muntaqim, former political prisoner.
- Salim Muwakkil, journalist.
- Kiilu Nyasha, journalist.
- Sekou Odinga, activist.
- Charlotte Hill O'Neal, community organizer.
- Pete O'Neal, Chairman, Kansas City chapter, who lives in exile in Tanzania.
- William O'Neal, FBI informant whose role was dramatized in the film Judas and the Black Messiah.
- Pat Parker, Black lesbian-feminist poet and activist. Died in 1989.
- Larry Pinkney, served nine years in prison in Canada and the U.S., and was also a member of the Republic of New Africa.
- Geronimo Pratt, Deputy Minister of Defense, died in 2011.
- Alex Rackley, New York member murdered by fellow Panthers in 1969. His killing resulted in the New Haven Black Panther trials.
- Malik Rahim, early New Orleans chapter organizer, currently a co-founder of Common Ground Collective, a post Hurricane Katrina relief organization.
- Nile Rodgers, guitarist for rock/disco band Chic and music producer.
- Bobby Rush, Minister of Defense, Illinois Chapter, and since 1993, U.S. Representative for Illinois's 1st congressional district.
- George W. Sams, Jr., convicted in the 1969 murder of Alex Rackley. He testified for the prosecution.
- Reggie Schell, Defense Captain, Philadelphia chapter.
- Bobby Seale, Chairman and co-founder of the Black Panthers.
- Afeni Shakur, one of the New York 21 and mother of Tupac Shakur.
- Assata Shakur, political activist still in exile in Cuba who remains on the FBI Most Wanted Terrorist list.
- Russell Maroon Shoatz, served 49 years in prison for the murder of a Philadelphia police officer.
- Marion Stamps, member of Chicago chapter.
- Michael Tabor, New York activist and one of the Panther 21.
- Robert Trivers, evolutionary biologist.
- Denise Oliver-Vélez, professor, Contributing Editor for Daily Kos, and former activist and community organizer.
- John Watson, Detroit chapter leader and activist with the League of Revolutionary Black Workers.
- Michael Zinzun, activist.
