= Catherine Roraback =

American lawyer

Catherine Gertrude Roraback (September 17, 1920 – October 17, 2007) was a civil rights attorney in Connecticut, best known for representing Estelle Griswold and Dr. C. Lee Buxton in the famous 1965 Supreme Court case, Griswold v. Connecticut, which legalized the use of birth control in Connecticut and created the precedent of the right to privacy. She is also known for such cases as the New Haven Black Panther trials of 1971, in which she defended Black Panther member Ericka Huggins after she was accused of murder. Roraback dealt with issues such as women's rights and racial discrimination, and lived her life to defend the rights of the "dissenters and the dispossessed".

== Early life ==
Roraback, commonly known as "Katie", was born in Brooklyn, New York to Reverend Albert Edward Roraback and Gertrude Remsen Ditmars on September 17, 1920. Her parents were married in Brooklyn on June 24, 1914. Her father, Albert Roraback was a Congregational Minister of the Church of the Evangel in Brooklyn. Albert Roraback graduated from Yale Divinity School in 1905 and became a pastor at the Church of Evangel in 1910. Reverend Roraback was initially from Canaan, Connecticut, where his father, Alberto T. Roraback, was the chief justice of the Supreme Court of Connecticut.

Among Catherine's well-known relatives was her great-uncle, political boss J. Henry Roraback, who controlled the Connecticut Republican Party from 1912 to 1937, serving as the party's chairman. The Republican Party successfully unified and controlled most affairs throughout the state in the 1920s under Roraback's leadership. At the time, he was considered the most influential man in Connecticut. He was a strong influence in the creation of Connecticut's Candlewood Lake, which is used today to generate electricity. Ironically, amidst the struggle for suffrage at the beginning of the 20th century, J. Henry Roraback opposed the bill that would grant women's suffrage in the United States. This stance contrasted significantly with Catherine's deep involvement in women's rights and her promotion of feminism that came to be her legacy.

Catherine Roraback was also a cousin Andrew Roraback, a state politician and judge from Connecticut. Her family ties to political leaders in Connecticut are extensive and were a powerful influence on her career, as was the influence of her parents, both of whom were social activists.

Roraback attended Mount Holyoke College, from which she graduated in 1941, and Yale Law School, in where she graduated in 1948. She was the only woman in her graduating class at Yale. In 1955, Roraback took over her family's solo practice in Canaan, Connecticut. She inherited the practice from her uncle, J. Clinton Roraback, who was a trial lawyer. The practice was founded in 1873 by her grandfather, Alberto Roraback. She continued the solo practice in Canaan until her death in 2007.

== Career ==
=== Early career ===
Throughout her early career, Catherine Roraback participated in many controversial cases, such as a Smith Act trial in Connecticut in the 1950s, in which she defended members of the Communist party such as Ladislaus "Laddie" Michalowski, a Progressive organizer whom Roraback represented in front of the House Un-American Activities Committee.

In 1954, Roraback represented a defendant in Connecticut who was charged with violating the Smith Act in a case centered around a charge that the defendant had advocated the overthrow of the government of the United States because the defendant had read the writings of Karl Marx.

=== Griswold v. Connecticut ===
Catherine Roraback's participation in the Supreme Court case Griswold v. Connecticut began with the case's predecessor, Poe v. Ullman. In the late 1950s, the 1879 law banning contraceptives in Connecticut became a prominent issue for many women. Planned Parenthood executive director Estelle Griswold realized that the law was out of date and posed medical problems. She and Yale University chief of obstetrics and gynecology, Dr. Lee Buxton, along with Yale Law School professor Fowler Harper, took the issue to the Supreme Court, with Roraback leading the litigation. Roraback argued that the banning of contraceptives was a medical concern for women and a problem for married couples, and should be overturned. However, the Supreme Court ruled that because the law had never been enforced, it was not a serious issue and voted 5–4 to keep the law in place.

As a result, Griswold and Buxton decided to test whether or not the law would be enforced, and opened a birth control clinic in New Haven. The clinic was shut down almost immediately and Griswold and Buxton were arrested and found guilty of violating the law by providing birth control. The case was taken to court, with Catherine Roraback representing Griswold and Buxton. She took a different approach to this case and argued that the law violated the right to privacy for married couples. During the trial, Roraback continued to argue the right to privacy for married couples. However, after a brief time, it was understood that the Connecticut courts were not going to change their stance on birth control and Roraback would lose the case. The courts valued the moral issues of the law too greatly to effect a change. While defending Griswold and Buxton in what was then known to be the Buxton case in the Connecticut Superior Court, Roraback had already begun to file the appeals so that the case would be taken to the United States Supreme Court. Much to Roraback's relief, the jury ruled against Griswold and Buxton, considering the law necessary for the "preservation of mankind", a ruling that Roraback found ridiculous. She brought the case to the Supreme Court, where it came to be known as Griswold v. Connecticut.

Roraback continued the argument of the right to privacy for married couples during the Supreme Court trial mainly because privacy had become an important issue throughout the country in the last decade. The McCarthy hearings and fear of Soviet spying throughout the 1950s had left Americans paranoid about their privacy. It was logical for Roraback to use this as a defense, as she understood that this would be supported by a great deal of people. The argument was only in defense of married couples. The idea to extend the argument for unmarried couples was not considered because many considered the idea too vulgar and outlandish; in the 1950s, most Americans took a conservative attitude toward extramarital sex. The Supreme Court agreed with the argument, and voted 7–2 for the elimination of the law in 1965. As a result, contraceptives for married couples were legalized in Connecticut. Roraback achieved fame after the case and soon after defended many other women in cases regarding birth control and abortion, including Abele v. Markle, which legalized abortion in Connecticut in 1972, one year before the Supreme Court case Roe v. Wade. Griswold v. Connecticut then paved the way for Eisenstadt v. Baird, which legalized contraception for unmarried couples. The right to privacy became a Supreme Court of the United States precedent and is still in use throughout the United States.

=== New Haven Black Panther trials ===
In 1971, Catherine Roraback represented Black Panther leader Ericka Huggins in the New Haven Black Panther trials. Huggins and Bobby Seale, who was the national party chairman, were accused of ordering the murder of Alex Rackley, a 19-year-old member of the party who was believed to have been infiltrating the organization for the police. Seale was in New Haven making a speech at Yale University and was seen entering the Black Panther headquarters after finishing his speech, where Rackley was being held hostage and tortured. After the murder had taken place a few days later, the accused, Warren Kimbro, Lonnie McLucas, and George W. Sams Jr., admitted that Seale had ordered them to murder Rackley. Bobby Seale was put on trial with Huggins, who was said to have been assisting in Rackley's torture and had supported the plan for his execution. Roraback was Huggins's lawyer for the case.

Roraback used gender discrimination as a way to help Huggins' defense and persuade the jury of her innocence. Upon first entering the courtroom, Huggins commented on the lack of women assisting in the case, noting the male judge, jury, and attorneys. From that moment, Roraback realized that she may be able to convince the jury that Huggins was not as much of a leader in the party as she actually was and provoke sympathy for her. She manipulated the jury's sense of feminism by allowing Huggins to remark on her mistreatment due to discrimination. Roraback devised a plan to help Huggins win the case by providing a line for her to say if the cross examiner condescended or spoke over her. After being criticized while on the witness stand, Huggins said very clearly, "Well, you see, it's very hard, first of all, for a woman to be heard by men." The line worked as Roraback had intended it to. The jury began to side with Huggins and the majority eventually believed her to be innocent. The jury, however, could not reach unanimity and voted 10–2 vote Huggins's acquittal. The case was declared a mistrial for both her and Bobby Seale and both went free. Roraback representation was successful and influenced her role in defending women's rights.

=== Peter Reilly murder case ===
In 1973, Roraback faced yet another controversial case that impacted the Connecticut courts profoundly. Peter Reilly, an 18-year-old from Litchfield County, Connecticut, was accused of sexually assaulting and brutally murdering his mother, Barbara Gibbons, on September 28, 1973, after returning from a youth meeting at his church. Reilly arrived home and called the police after discovering his mother's mutilated body. When the police arrived they questioned Reilly about what happened and believed him to be acting suspiciously. They subjected him to over 25 hours of interrogation before he finally confessed to the crime. The police made him sign a formal confession before going on trial. Peter Reilly asked Roraback to represent him, as he was sure that he would be sentenced to years in prison without strong legal assistance. Roraback agreed to defend Reilly because she truly believed in his innocence and believed that the police had forced him to confess after hours of mental and emotional torture. Her determination to prove his innocence and expose the corruption that Reilly was subjected to was so strong that she agreed to take on the case for an infinitesimal amount of money. Despite lacking other evidence against Reilly and the doubts that most people had regarding the validity of the confession, Roraback was unable to persuade the court that he was innocent, the argument being that he had signed a formal confession. Peter Reilly was found guilty by the jury and sentenced to 6 to 16 years in prison.

Roraback appealed the verdict immediately, refusing to allow the court to get away with the conviction based on a forced confession. Soon after hearing the conviction, many friends and neighbors of Reilly's began to assist him in his campaign to be proven innocent. Among them was playwright Arthur Miller, who made the case a public issue and alerted The New York Times of the case and asked them to investigate. The outcome of the second case did not look promising for Reilly, as the prosecutor continued to stress the point that Reilly had confessed to the murder. However, as the case continued, the prosecutor, John Bianchi, died suddenly and was replaced. The new prosecutor quickly found details and extensive evidence that showed that Reilly was miles away from his house when the murder happened. Upon discovering this evidence, the judge dropped all charges against Reilly. Due to the considerable names involved around Reilly, the case was considered among the most significant in Connecticut. It led to Governor Ella T. Grasso ordering "a separate investigation that eventually resulted in the appointment of a civilian state police advisory committee", although by 1993, Reilly wondered if it really meant anything, mentioning the case of Richard Lapointe, a slightly handicapped person who was convicted in 1992 of a murder and sentenced to life without parole due to confession (as it turned out, Lapointe would spend 26 years in prison before being released).

The story was the subject of the books Guilty Until Proven Innocent and A Death In Canaan, the latter made into a TV movie (1978).

Reilly was essentially adopted by the Madow family. By 2003, he was working in a music store. The case reopened in 2003 when Peter Reilly demanded to see the files from the case. Though he was found not guilty, he still felt it necessary to uncover who had murdered and sexually assaulted his mother, particularly since State police and even prosecutors had gone on record of the idea that Reilly was guilty despite all that had transpired. However, State police were reluctant to release the files to the public, a notion that angered many who felt that the murder should be solved. The Freedom of Information Commission eventually ruled that the police were obligated to release the files but were not required to release those mentioning Peter Reilly, as his records were erased from public view.

Reilly became a reform advocate and wrote a letter in 2022 advocating the passing of a bill (SB1071) in Connecticut that would prohibit the police from knowingly lying to suspects under 18; the bill passed.

== Awards and honors ==
=== Catherine Roraback Awards (NARAL Pro-Choice Connecticut) ===
Since 1980, NARAL Pro-Choice Connecticut has given out the Catherine Roraback Award, an award given to individuals and organizations that have demonstrated leadership, courage and activism in the struggle to protect privacy rights, the legal right to obtain an abortion, and access to reproductive health for all women. The award has been given to numerous politicians, activists, healthcare workers, and others involved in the struggle for reproductive freedom.

=== Other honors and awards ===
Throughout her career, Catherine Roraback participated in many historically significant groups. She co-founded the Connecticut Civil Liberties Union, an organization that works to secure the rights of citizens as listed in the Bill of Rights. Roraback also served as president of the National Lawyers Guild from 1973 to 1985, an association of lawyers that describes itself as "defending human rights". She served on the Connecticut Women's Education and Legal Fund and was a board member emeritus of the American Civil Liberties Union.

Roraback received numerous awards for her legal and humanitarian actions throughout her life. Among these are induction into the Connecticut Women's Hall of Fame, an esteem also received by Katharine Hepburn and Helen Keller. She is also the namesake of the Catherine Roraback Law Scholarship Fund of the Litchfield County Bar Association.

== Later life ==
After trying many cases throughout the civil rights movement, Catherine Roraback continued her practice in Canaan, Connecticut, continuing to defend civil rights. Her practice also served to help in smaller affairs including criminal defenses and divorces. She participated in Planned Parenthood as a legal counsel long after Griswold, and continued to defend, as she called them, the "dissenters and the dispossessed". Roraback died at Noble Horizons living facility in Salisbury, Connecticut, of undisclosed causes on October 17, 2007.
