= Tim Hayes =

Tim Hayes may refer to:

- Tim Hayes (Black Panther Party) (born 1950), founder of the Atlanta chapter of the Black Panther Party
- Tim F. Hayes (born 1944), Irish Gaelic footballer
