= New Haven Police Department =

Law enforcement agency responsible for the city of New Haven, Connecticut

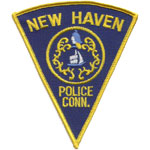
- New Haven Police Department Patch

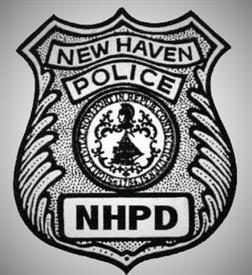
- New Haven Police Department Badge
- Abbreviation: NHPD

Agency overview
- Formed: July 27, 1861; 165 years ago

Jurisdictional structure
- Area: 20.1 sq mi (52.1 km2)
- Population: 130,660 (2013)

Operational structure
- Headquarters: 1 Union Ave. New Haven, CT
- Police Officers: ▼352 of 392 (2025)
- Acting Chief responsible: David Zannelli

Facilities
- Area Commands: 10 district substations
- Detention Centers: 1

Website
- https://www.newhavenct.gov/government/departments-divisions/new-haven-police-department

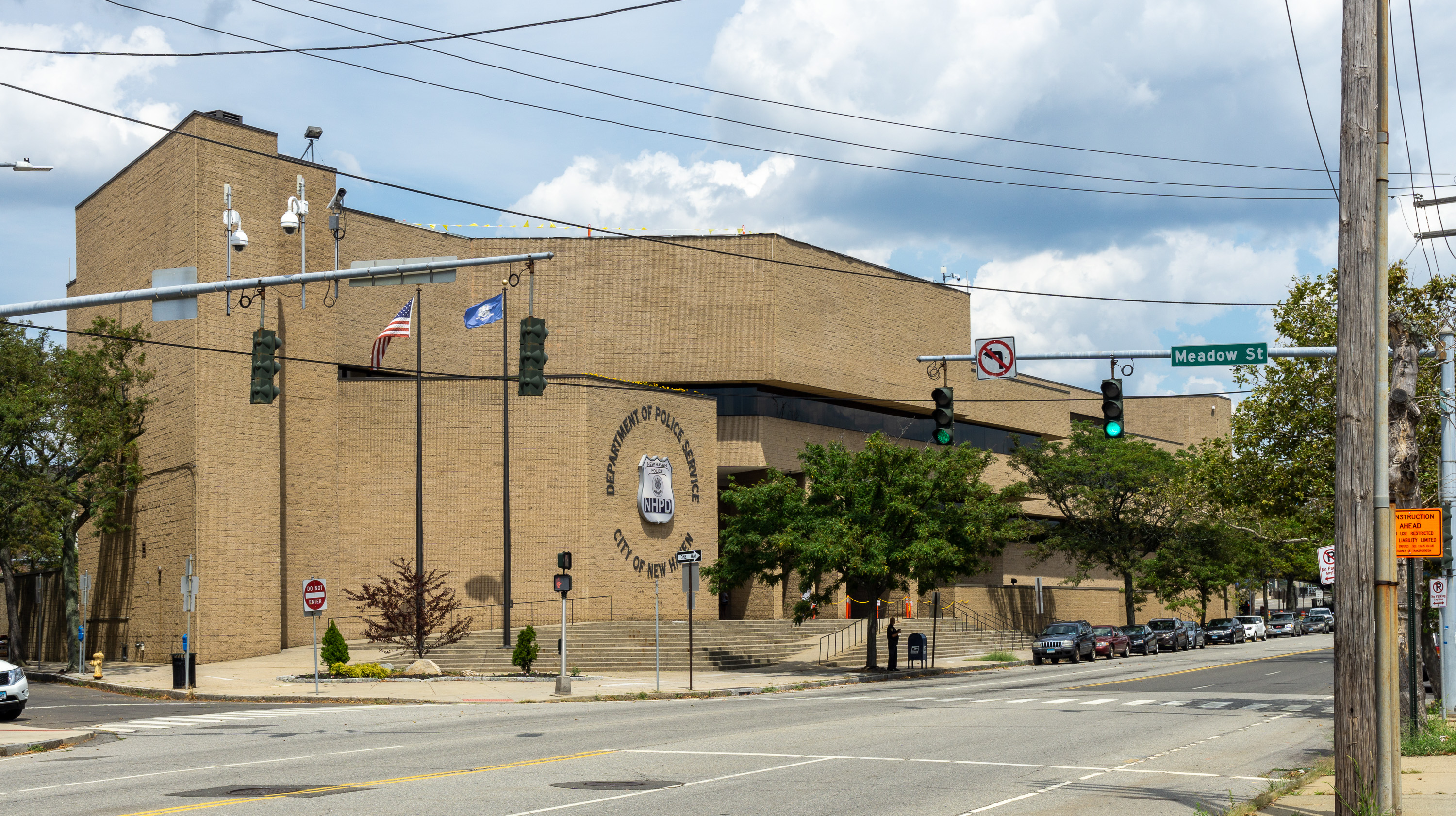
The police headquarters at 1 Union Avenue, designed by Douglas Orr (built 1973)

The New Haven Police Department is the law enforcement agency responsible for the city of New Haven, Connecticut.

== History ==
=== Founding and early years ===
The NHPD was formed with the signing of a bill on July 27, 1861. Its first elected Chief was Jonathan W. Pond.

Various reprimands were made against officers in early years for offenses such as being absent from the beat, being drunk on the job, and assaulting a woman in jail.

After the Civil War, James T. Mullen was a lieutenant in the NHPD.

The Yale Police Department was created in 1894, when two NHPD officers volunteered to be assigned only to the Yale University campus.

=== 1960s ===
During what would become known as the "long, hot summer of 1967", riots broke out in New Haven following the death of a Puerto Rican man following his altercation with a white man. The NHPD and CT State Police made over 500 arrests in late August, mostly under the violation of curfew set by then Mayor Richard C. Lee.

==== Black Panthers ====
In 1969, the NHPD raided the New Haven Black Panthers headquarters as part of a case stemming from the murder of Alex Rackley. It was this case that turned into the New Haven Black Panther trials, when Black Panther co-founder Bobby Seale was put on trial.

In 2006, Kelly Moye revealed that he was recruited by Nick Pastore for the NHPD Intelligence Division to infiltrate the Black Panthers in New Haven.

=== 1970s ===
The Department of Police Service headquarters, located on Union Avenue, was built in 1973. It was designed by Douglas Orr, deCossy, Winder and Associates in the brutalist style.

In the mid-1970s, an FBI agent was tasked with going undercover in the New Haven mob world. He found that police, politicians, and mobsters were all working together.

=== 2010s ===
In August 2019, NHPD Captain Anthony Duff was shot and another killed in the same shooting The Department arrested the shooter for murder and attempted murder of a police officer in 2021.

=== 2020s ===
In May 2020, during a Black Lives Matter protest following the murder of George Floyd, protestors gathered at the NHPD building.

On June 19, 2022, a man named Randy Cox was being transported in a police van when it suddenly maneuvered to avoid a crash. Cox, who was in a van without seatbelts, was slammed against a wall of the van, resulting in Cox becoming paralyzed. NHPD policy required police to call for medical assistance, and officers put Cox in a holding cell at a detention facility and waited for paramedics to arrive there. Five officers were put on paid leave, and Cox's family filed a lawsuit against the NHPD and hired attorney Benjamin Crump. In November 2022 five officers involved in the incident were charged with second-degree reckless endangerment and cruelty to persons. In March 2023, New Haven's police chief recommended four of the officers be fired. The firings must still be approved by the Board of Police Commissioners.

== Department ==
=== Civilian workforce ===
In addition to sworn officers, the department employs civilian employees for administrative functions funded partly by the Community Oriented Policing Services program.

=== Emergency services ===
The Emergency services division of the New Haven Police Department is made up of several specialist teams.

==== Crisis negotiation ====
The team is trained to defuse hostage situations, talk to barricaded and/or suicidal persons, and alleviate a situation gone wrong without injury or the direct application of force.

==== SCUBA TEAM / USRT ====
The New Haven Police Department also has a professional underwater search and recovery team which falls under the command of the N.H.P.D. Emergency Services Division. A New Haven Police Diver must be certified as an Advanced Open Water Diver. The team has a 40 foot Metal Craft Firestorm boat and a Zodiac for smaller waterways. The team is responsible for the recovery and preservation of any person(s) and/or contraband, body recovery, and weapon recovery located in waterways throughout New Haven County.

The N.H.P.D. Dive Team consists of fourteen active members. Team responsibilities include:

1. Perform dive recovery and search tasks
2. Line tending
3. Underwater communications with divers
4. Act as O.I.C. of dive operations
5. Report findings of operations and analysis of remedies
6. Maintain Emergency Services fitness level
7. Maintain equipment

Underwater Search & Recovery Team members (USRT) are also Certified Dive Rescue Level I and II SCUBA Divers. All team members must qualify once a year by performing swim fitness testing, underwater testing, dive competency testing, and a physical fitness test as well. The New Haven USRT also trains twice per month throughout the year.

The USRT is also attached to Region II in Connecticut and is responsible for HAZMAT DECON of all public safety personnel in Region II. NHPD USRT members are certified through the Department of Homeland Security (Anniston Alabama) as HAZMAT Techs in this field.

=== SWAT team ===
The New Haven Police Department has a SWAT team.

=== Narcotics unit ===
The department's narcotics unit was disbanded in 2007 after two officers were arrested and two others implicated in a corruption sting. The unit was replaced by a VICE/Narcotics unit in 2009, and that unit played a crucial role in the investigation of the murder of college student Annie Le.
