= Seize the Time (book) =

1970 book by American political activist Bobby Seale

Seize The Time
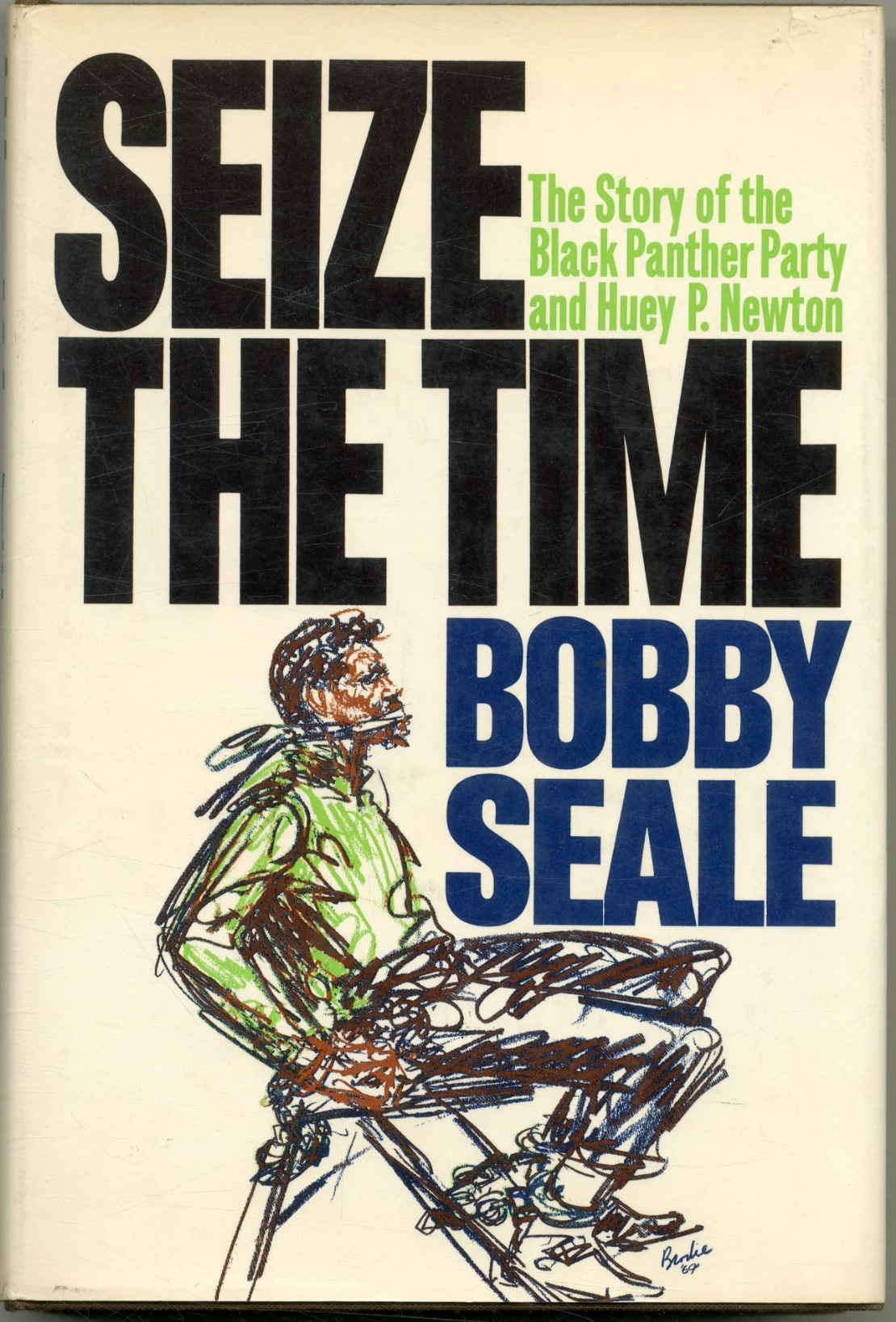
- Author: Bobby Seale
- Language: English
- Subject: Black Panther Party
- Publisher: Random House
- Publication date: 1970
- Publication place: United States
- OCLC: 252385357

Seize The Time: The Story of The Black Panther Party and Huey P. Newton is a 1970 book by political activist Bobby Seale. It was recorded in San Francisco County Jail between November 1969 and March 1970, by Arthur Goldberg, a reporter for the San Francisco Bay Guardian. An advocacy book on the cause and principles of the Black Panther Party, Seize The Time is considered a staple in Black Power literature.

Seize the Time is a first-person narrative written from the perspective of Bobby Seale who recounts the story of the Black Panthers through conversational style prose. Reissued by Black Classic Press in 1991, the book begins with an introduction written by Seale wherein he provides an overview of the Black Panther Party, and calls for people to become activists in the fight for equality.

== Synopsis ==
The book has seven chronological chapters, beginning with "Growing Up: Before the Party", which includes an introduction to Bobby Seale, his initial relationship with Huey P. Newton, and the antecedent behind starting the Black Panther Party.

The second chapter, titled "Huey: Getting the Party Going", provides the philosophical and ideological underpinnings of the party. It includes references to Quotations from Chairman Mao Tse-tung, which is commonly referred to as "The Little Red Book," and Fanon’s The Wretched of the Earth, which Seale introduced to Huey Newton.

The third chapter, titled "The Party Grows, Eldridge Joins", chronicles the expansion of the party and the positive effect of having Eldridge Cleaver, who was a writer for Ramparts magazine, join the movement.

The fourth chapter, "Picking Up the Gun", provides an account of the arrest of Seale and other Panthers while they were attempting to speak out at the state capitol in Sacramento on May 2, 1967, against the government creating what the Black Panthers believed to be racist legislation.

The fifth chapter titled "The Shit Comes Down: Free Huey", documents the arrest of Huey Newton and subsequent conviction for second-degree murder. The Free Huey party is covered, also referred to as Huey's birthday rally, a barbeque picnic rally for the Huey P. Newton Defense Fund. It was also a campaign fundraiser for Newton, who was running on the ticket for Congress from the Seventh Congressional District, and Seale, who was running for the State Assembly for the Seventeenth District, wherein a coalition was formed between the Black Panther Party and Stokely Carmichael, and other members of the Student Nonviolent Coordinating Committee. This chapter also covers events after the assassination of Martin Luther King Jr., including the shooting of Bobby Hutton and arrest of Cleaver.

The sixth chapter, titled "Chicago: Kidnapped, Chained, Tired, and Gagged", chronicles the events surrounding Seale being kidnapped by federal agents and transported to Chicago, where he is on trial in connection with the New Haven Black Panther trials.

The book's final chapter, "Pigs, Problems, Politics, and Panthers", focuses on Seale’s beliefs regarding the underlying reasons for the Black Panther Raids, including Eldridge Cleaver's negotiations with North Vietnam and the CIA-FBI Infiltration known as COINTELPRO. This chapter also outlines the rules for members of the Black Panther Party, including their fight to end male chauvinism, and an overview of the Party's revolutionary community programs, such as Free Breakfast for Children, Liberation Schools, Legal Aid, Free Medical Care, and a Free Clothing Program. The book ends with a final essay regarding the importance of "seizing the time" in the fight for revolutionary change.

== See also ==
- The Wretched of the Earth
- Soul on Ice
- The Autobiography of Malcolm X
- Mao's Little Red Book Quotations from Chairman Mao Tse-tung
