= Robert Templeton (artist) =

American artist (1929–1991)

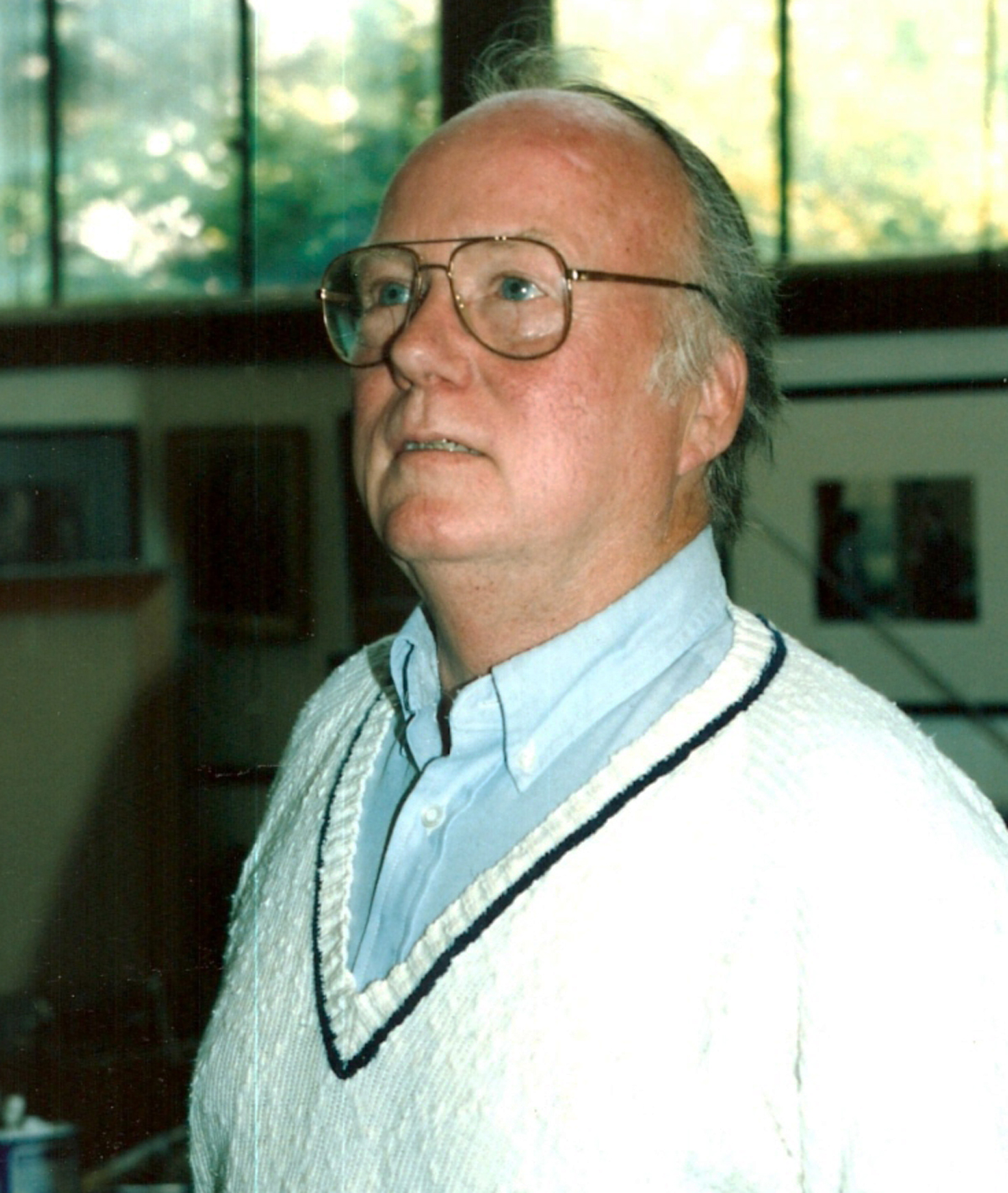
- Templeton in 1990
- Born: May 11, 1929; Red Oak, Iowa, U.S.
- Died: July 16, 1991 (aged 62); Woodbury, Connecticut, U.S.
- Occupations: Artist, portrait painter
- Website: www.roberttempleton.com

Robert Templeton (May 11, 1929 – July 16, 1991) was an American artist. His work includes the civil rights collection "Lest we forget...Images of the Black Civil Rights Movement", highlighting seminal figures from the movement. Templeton painted the portrait of former President Jimmy Carter that is displayed in the Hall of presidents of the Smithsonian Institution's National Portrait Gallery.

== Early life ==
Robert Templeton was born into a farming family in Iowa on May 11, 1929. Due to the Wall Street crash that year, his childhood was difficult. The family depended on growing their own vegetables, supplemented by his father's wages as a WPA worker, and government rice handouts. Their quality of life improved when his father was entrusted with the management of a farm in Montgomery County, Iowa, as a tenant farmer. Templeton later said that all the deprivations of his childhood toughened him rather than defeated him.

Templeton began drawing when he was about 11 years old and recalled how he looked forward to the arrival of The Saturday Evening Post with the cover painting by Norman Rockwell, which contributed to his decision to become an artist. In between school and farming chores he filled his sketchbooks with scenes from the Iowa countryside. His sketches caught the attention of his high school principal, Mary Buffington, who encouraged him to pursue a career in art.

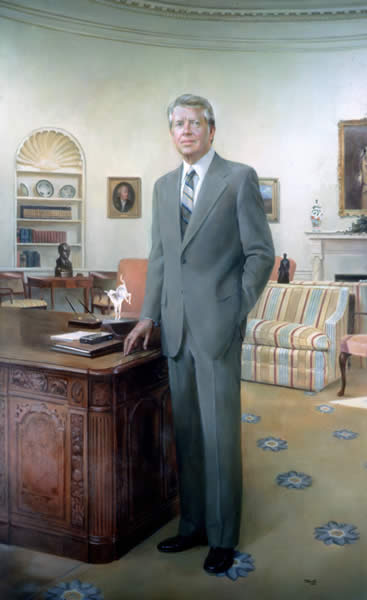
Templeton's portrait of President Carter, displayed in the National Portrait Gallery.

== Education ==
Templeton won a National Merit Scholarship, and Buffington helped him to apply to the Kansas City Art Institute. He was accepted and arrived in Kansas City in 1946 at the age of seventeen. During that year Templeton was awarded the Vanderslice scholarship. Early on, Templeton was able to cover his living expenses with portrait commissions. He spent his summers in Colorado, honing his skill in portraiture on the sidewalks of Estes Park.

In Kansas City he came under the influence and tutelage of Thomas Hart Benton, who sat for him for his portrait. Templeton had gone to the Benton home for the sitting, and when the sketch was finished, Benton called in his daughter to get her reaction to the portrait. When she approved, Benton was delighted, and autographed it.

In the summer of 1949 Templeton traveled to Santa Fe, New Mexico, to visit with the artist John French Sloan and his wife Helen. A lifelong friendship developed from that visit, and when Templeton moved to New York to continue his studies at the Art Students League of New York, Sunday afternoon teas and discussions about art at the Sloan home became a regular event in Templeton's life. With a letter of recommendation from John Sloan, Templeton was able to get a Ball Grant from the Art Students League two years in a row. He attended classes in the Fall, Winter, and Spring, and he supplemented his income by ushering at Carnegie Hall. He continued to spend summers as a sidewalk artist in Estes Park, which generated enough income to last him through the school year.

== Army service ==
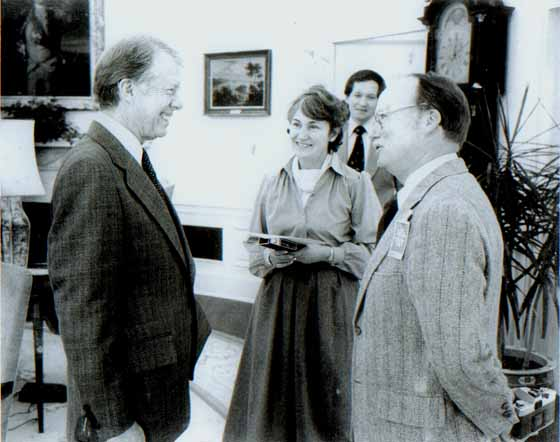
With President Carter in the Oval Office

In 1952, Templeton was drafted into the United States Army for a two-year tour of duty. During basic training at Fort Leonard Wood he painted a forty-foot mural Portrait of America, which showed the influence of Benton. After basic training Templeton was sent to Germany. There he took advantage of his furloughs to visit the great museums of Spain and Italy, studying the Old Masters. While still in the army, Templeton met and married his wife Leonore, and upon discharge in 1954, they settled in New York City, where he shared a studio on the Lower East Side.

== Trucking and highway themes ==
In 1963, Templeton and his then pregnant wife moved back to Iowa. Inspired by the newly constructed superhighway system covering the Midwest, he devoted his energy to creating works with a transportation age theme. He participated both in the Mid America Annual at the Nelson-Atkins Museum of Art in Kansas City, and the Annual Iowa Artists Exhibition at the Des Moines Art Center. His work focused on the effect the automobile had on the landscape, and the way we live. One of the recurring images in his work is the long distance trucker, whom he uses as the protagonist of high stress modern man. He experienced the life of a trucker first hand when he accompanied his brother Darwin, who owned a trucking company, on cross-country hauls. The paintings and constructions of trucks and highways were shown in 1964 at the Banfer Gallery in New York under the title L'Homme Machine (Machine Man), and posthumously in 2004 as Life on the Road in the Founders Gallery at the Golden Age of Trucking Museum in Connecticut.

== Connecticut ==
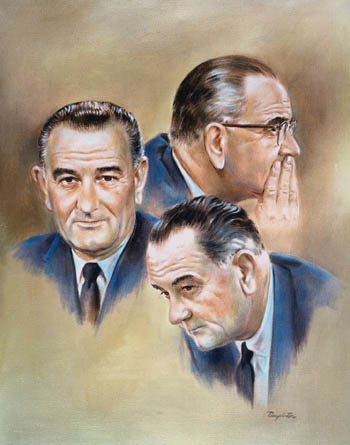
Templeton's portrait of President Lyndon Johnson

In 1965, Templeton and his wife purchased a farm in Connecticut to live with their three sons. The Connecticut period was filled with commissions of leaders in government, industry and entertainment, among them presidents Lyndon Johnson and Jimmy Carter, First Lady Rosalynn Carter, Vice President Hubert Humphrey, author William Styron, baseball player Stan Musial, poet Carl Sandburg, former Texas Governor John Connally, and opera singers Luciano Pavarotti and Joan Sutherland.

== Civil rights period ==
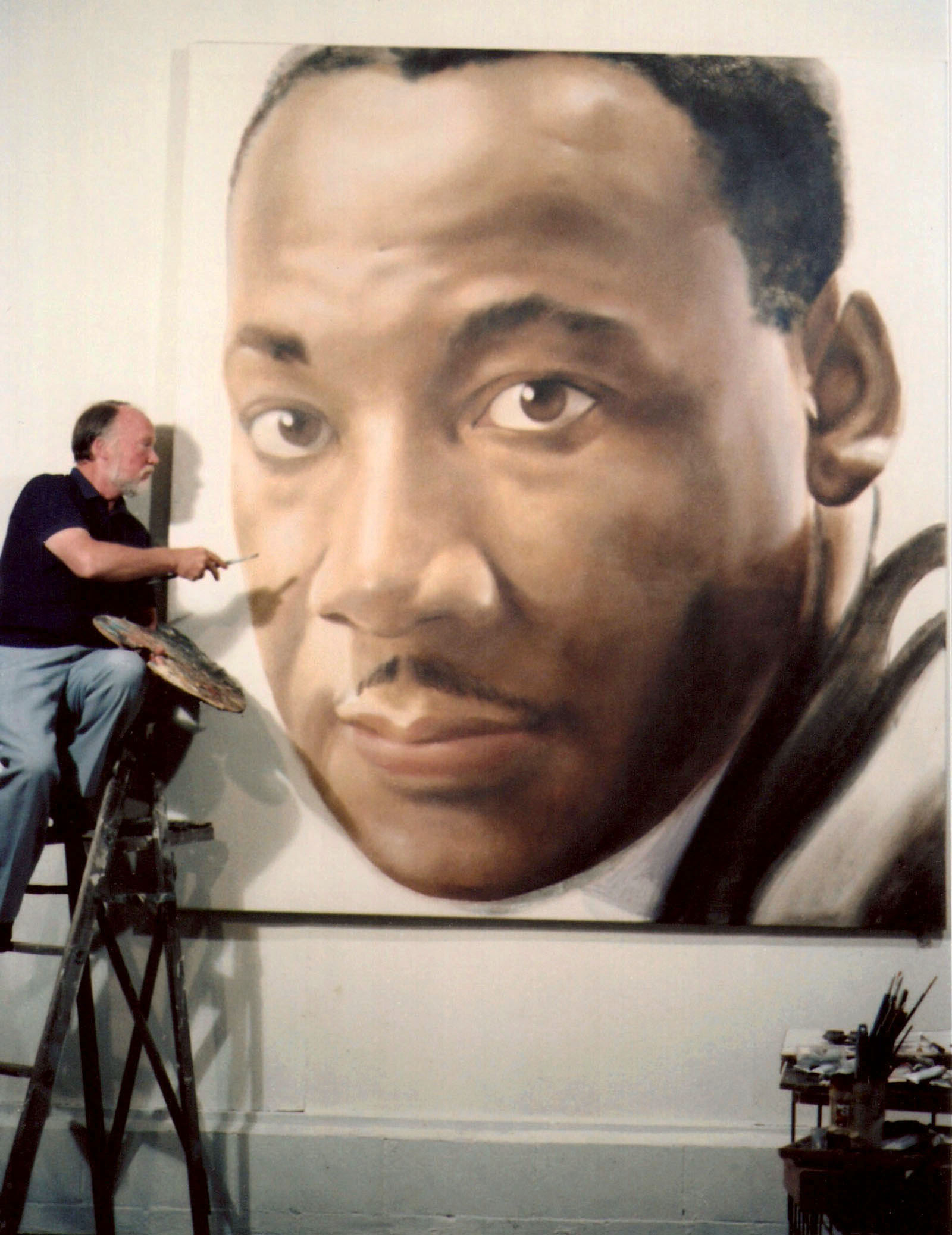
Robert Templeton finishing his portrait of Martin Luther King Jr.

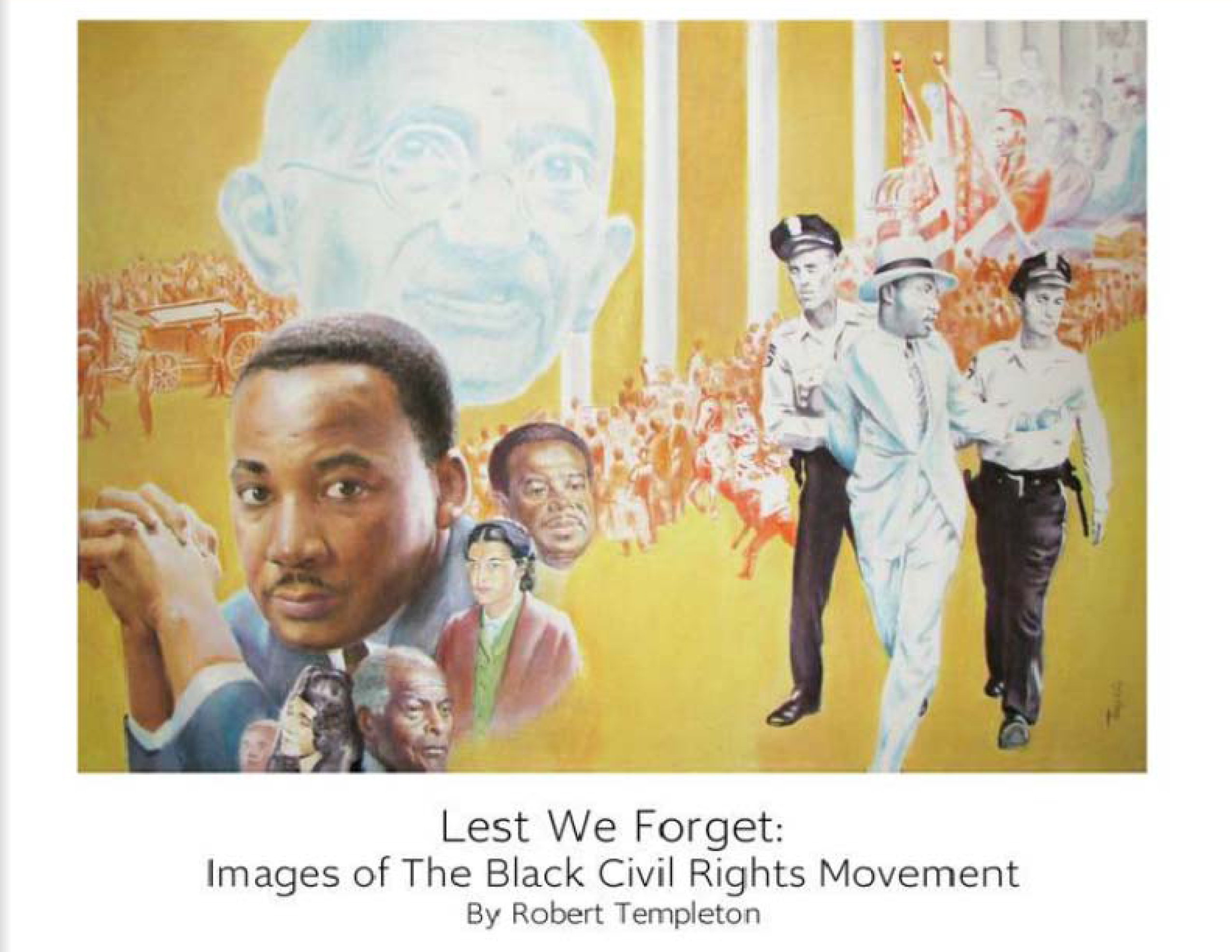
Portrait showcasing the collection Lest We Forget: Images of the Black Civil Rights Movement

Templeton continued to add paintings to his Machine-Man series, but in 1967, he was an unwitting participant in an event which inspired him to take his art in a new direction. In the summer of 1967, Templeton was in Detroit painting private portrait commissions, when riots broke out. Templeton recorded the chaos in his sketchbook, observing looting, fighting National Guardsmen, firefighters battling blazes, and even the governor's press conference. His sketches of the events became the cover art for the August 4, 1967, edition of Time magazine, the second cover he had done for the news magazine.

In 1971, Templeton was commissioned by CBS News to be the courtroom artist for the New Haven murder trial of Bobby Seale, founder of the Black Panther Party. Because the court was closed to artists and reporters, Templeton had to create his sketches secretly. The resultant images are perhaps the only visual record that exists from the trial. Templeton was flown with his sketches to New York City, where the images were shown by Walter Cronkite on the CBS Evening News. In 2007, Templeton's Black Panther trial sketches were acquired by Yale University and exhibited at the Beinecke Library.

After his experience in the Detroit riots, Templeton devoted more time to paint a record of the leading figures in the Civil Rights Movement. He disdained inequity and felt that with the profound change in race relations, the nation owed the participants recognition for their devotion to the cause. For nearly twenty years he arranged portrait sittings with leaders in the movement with the help and advice of Benjamin Mays, mentor and friend of Martin Luther King Jr.

The resulting collection of over thirty paintings was first shown at Emory University with a grant from the Georgia Council of the Arts and the National Endowment for the Arts. The title "Lest we forget... Images of the Black Civil Rights Movement" came out of a conversation Templeton had with Mays, who worried that so many people, their work and sacrifice, might be forgotten someday. Since its first showing in 1986, the collection has toured the country.

== Death ==
At age 62, and after drawing and painting for five decades, Templeton died at his home in Connecticut on July 16, 1991, of natural causes.
