= George W. Sams Jr. =

Member of the Black Panther Party

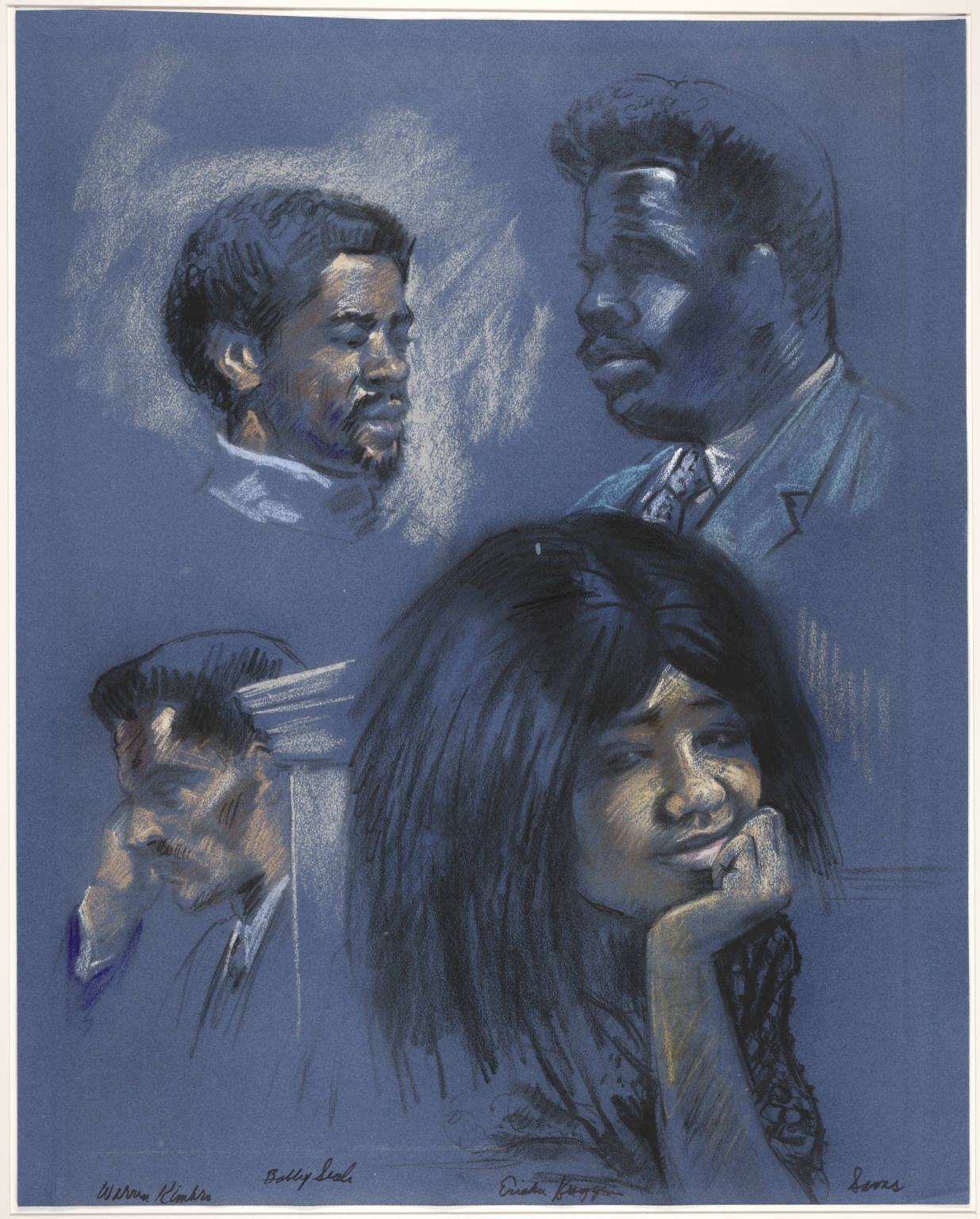
A courtroom sketch of Black Panthers Bobby Seale, George W. Sams Jr., Warren Kimbro, and Ericka Huggins, during the 1970 New Haven Black Panther trials.

George W. Sams Jr. (born c. 1946) was a member of the Black Panther Party convicted in the 1969 murder of New York Panther Alex Rackley, which resulted in the New Haven Black Panther trials of 1970.

== Trial ==
Sams turned state's evidence in return for a reduced charge of second-degree murder. He testified that, acting under direct orders from national party leader Bobby Seale, he arranged for the kidnapping of Rackley to Panther headquarters in New Haven, where Rackley was tortured for two days then transported to the marshlands of Middlefield, Connecticut, where he was shot by Warren Kimbro and Lonnie McLucas on Sams' orders. According to Hugh Pearson, who wrote the book The Shadow of the Panther: Huey Newton and the Price of Black Power in America:

The Rackley case became one of the most controversial Panther cases of all, a prime example of the question of which illegal activities could be blamed on genuine party leaders, and which on agents-provocateurs or just plain deviants in the party. Seale was accused of ordering Rackley's murder for being an alleged government agent, with the words, ‘Do away with him.’ Williams and others were accused of being present when Seale gave the command, George Sams accepting it, then he, Lonnie McLucas, and Warren Kimbro, the alleged triggermen, driving Rackley to a swamp to kill him. The case hinged largely on the questions of whether Seale actually did appear to give the command, and if so, how Seale’s command could be interpreted. The Panthers would insist that party member George Sams ordered the murder of Rackley on his own.

Neither Kimbro nor McLucas corroborated Sams' testimony regarding Seale's involvement. Sams and Kimbro were convicted of murder. Lonnie McLucas was acquitted on all charges except conspiracy to commit murder. A jury deadlocked on the charges against Seale and Black Panther leader Ericka Huggins, and the charges against both were dropped. Members of the Black Panther party accused Sams of being an FBI informant.

Sams was paroled in 1974.

== In popular culture ==
- Terayle Hill portrays Sams in the film Judas and the Black Messiah. The film depicts Sams as an FBI informant and that his testimony against Bobby Seale was done under orders of the FBI in order to keep Seale imprisoned.
