= Larry Pinkney =

American political activist

Larry James Pinkney
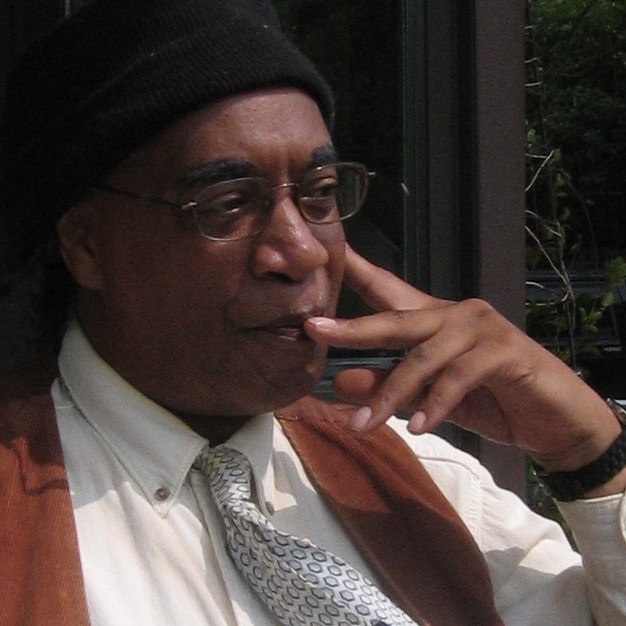
- Larry Pinkney in 2015
- Occupation: Political activist
- Organizations: Black Panther Party, Republic of New Africa, San Francisco Black Caucus, Black National Independence Party
- Known for: Black Panther Party membership, Republic of New Africa membership, advocacy for civil rights
- Criminal charges: Assault and burglary (United States), attempted extortion (Canada)
- Criminal penalty: Nine years imprisonment (Canada and U.S.)

Larry James Pinkney is an American political activist. A former member of the Black Panther Party and the Republic of New Africa, he served nine years in prison in Canada and the U.S.

== Activism ==
Pinkney served as co-chair of the San Francisco Black Caucus in the early 1970s, and later as chairman of the Black National Independence Party.

== Legal issues and imprisonment ==
Pinkney was convicted of assault and burglary charges in the United States in 1973, accusations which he denied. Before sentencing, he fled to Europe and then to Canada, intending to apply for political asylum. In Vancouver, he was convicted in 1976 of attempted extortion and sentenced to a five-year prison term.

While in prison, Pinkney filed a case with the United Nations Human Rights Committee in Geneva, which ruled that the Canadian government had violated his rights due to lengthy delays in providing court documents needed to file an appeal. Pinkney served his full five-year sentence in a Canadian prison.
