= Ericka Huggins =

American activist and educator (born 1948)

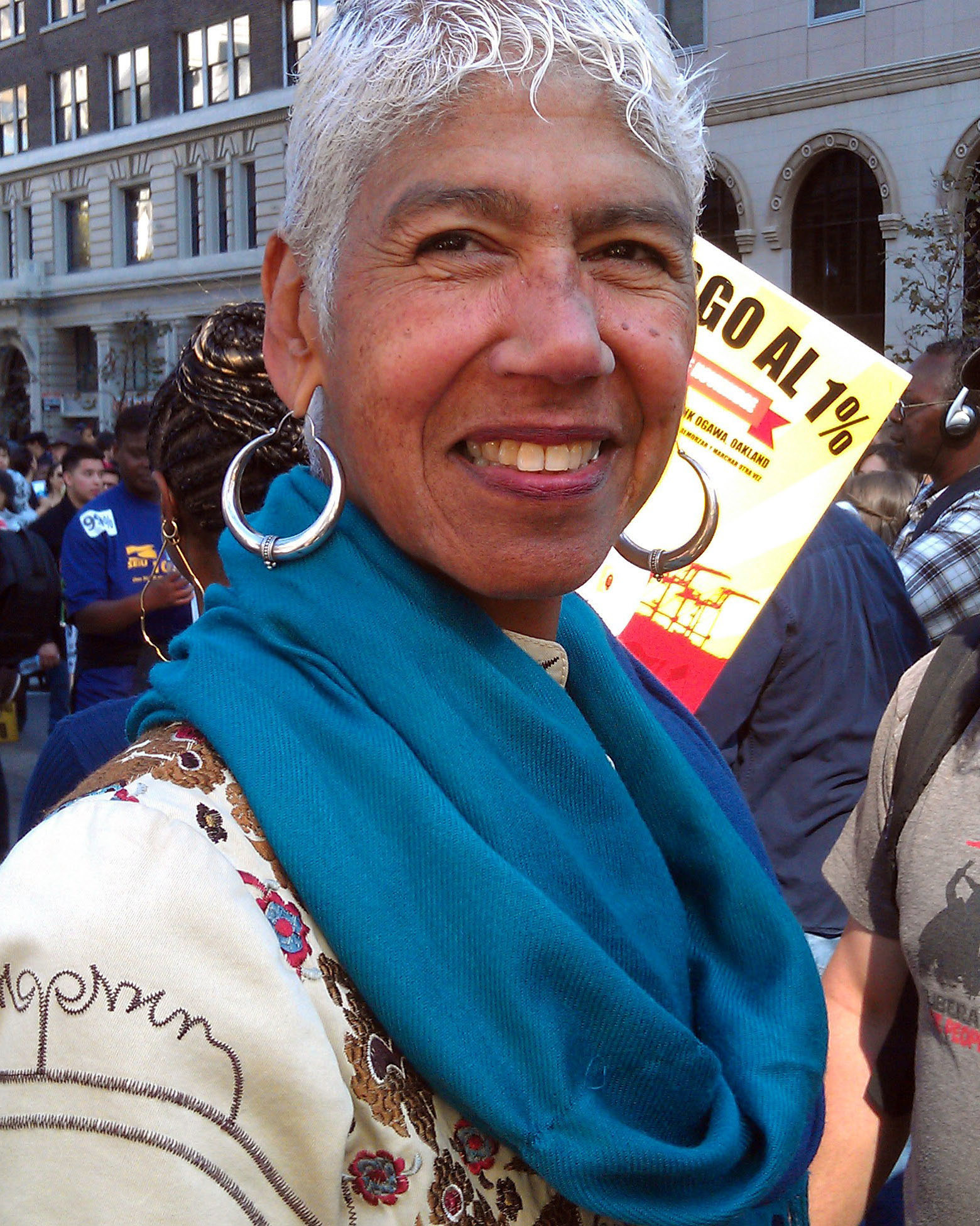
- Huggins in 2011
- Born: Ericka Jenkins; January 5, 1948 (age 78); Washington, D.C., U.S.
- Education: Cheyney University; Lincoln University (BA); California State University, East Bay (MA)
- Occupations: Activist, educator
- Years active: 1967–present
- Known for: New Haven Black Panther Trials
- Political party: Black Panther Party
- Spouse: John Huggins (m. 1968; died 1969)
- Partner(s): James Mott (1971–1972); Lisbet Tellefsen (2006–present)
- Children: 3

Ericka Huggins (née Jenkins; born January 5, 1948) is an American activist. She was a leading member of the Black Panther Party (BPP) for 14 years. She was married to John Huggins in 1968.

== Early life and education ==
Born Ericka Jenkins in Washington, D.C., Huggins was the middle child of three. After graduating high school in 1966, Huggins attended Cheyney State College, now Cheyney University of Pennsylvania. She then attended Lincoln University, an historically black school in Philadelphia, Pennsylvania. There she studied education, and eventually met John Huggins, whom she married in 1968. Although Lincoln University's Black Student Congress was opposed to female leaders, Huggins engaged in the group despite the opposition.

She has an MA in sociology from California State University, East Bay. Her thesis focused on an education model which proposed "student-centered, community-based tuition-free education for students to minimize the multigenerational race and gender trauma of American".

== Involvement with the Black Panther Party ==
Flier for the Black Panther Party's Black Community Survival Conference in Oakland, March 1972

While at Lincoln University, both Ericka and her husband were inspired to leave school and join the Black Panther Party. Her motivation came from a Ramparts magazine article she read that discussed the cruel treatment of Huey P. Newton while incarcerated. A picture in the article depicted Newton shirtless, with a bullet wound in his stomach, strapped to a hospital gurney. In 1967, the couple arrived in Los Angeles and joined the Black Panther Party.

Eventually, her husband John Huggins, became leader of the Los Angeles Chapter of the Black Panther Party. While at home with her three week old daughter, her husband was assassinated on January 17, 1969, on the UCLA campus due to a feud between the Black Panther Party and a Black Nationalist group, US Organization, that was fueled by the FBI's COINTELPRO program. After his death, Ericka attended his burial in his birthplace of New Haven, Connecticut. Following his funeral, she decided to move there and open up a new Black Panther Party branch. She led this new chapter along two other women, Kathleen Neal Cleaver and Elaine Brown.

While involved with the Black Panthers, Huggins held several positions: both an editor and writer for the Black Panther Intercommunal News Service, director of the party's Oakland Community School from 1973 to 1981, and a member of the party's Central Committee. After spending two years in prison, Huggins decided to leave the Black Panthers, after being a member for 14 years, the longest membership of any woman.

=== New Haven Black Panther trials ===
In 1969, members of the New Haven Black Panthers tortured and murdered Alex Rackley, whom they suspected of being an informant. Along with Black Panther Party co-founder Bobby Seale, Huggins was charged with murder, kidnapping, and conspiracy. Ericka Huggins was heard speaking on a tape recording of Rackley's interrogation that was played during the trial. The trial sparked protests across the country about whether the Panthers would receive a fair trial. The jury selection was the longest in state history. In May 1971, the jury deadlocked 10 to 2 for Huggins' acquittal, and she was not retried. The Panthers who had taken Rackley and shot him had already been convicted, and the public demonstration of internecine conflict and extreme violence sped the decline of the Panthers.

== Career ==
In 1972, she moved to California and was elected to the Berkeley Community Development Council. In 1976, she was the first Black person elected to the Alameda County Board of Education.

From 2008 to 2015, Huggins worked in the Peralta Community College District as a professor of sociology, African American studies, and women's studies. She taught sociology at both Laney College and at Berkeley City College, as well as women's studies at California State University.

For more than 30 years, she has lectured at Stanford University, Cornell University, and University of California, Los Angeles where she has spoken about education, spirituality, feminism, prison reform, and queer people of color homelessness.

Huggins worked for 15 years at the Siddha Yoga Prison Project where she led hatha yoga and meditation to groups including incarcerated people, public school children, and college students. At the Mind/Body Medical Institute, which works with Harvard medical school, she continued sharing her spiritual practices for 5 years.

== Writing and poetry ==
While awaiting trial from 1969 to 1971, Huggins spent her time writing in the Prison Niantic State Farm for Women. Writing about the poor social conditions she and her community endured, she viewed storytelling as a form of self-defense, personal agency, and educational activism. Her work is defined by themes such as love and hate, time and space, sexism and feminism, spirituality, racism, and nationalism. Insights and Poems, a book of poetry, co-written by Huggins and Huey P. Newton, founder of the Black Panther Party, was released in 1975.

== Personal life ==
Ericka Huggins married John Huggins in 1968 until his murder in 1969. Ericka gave birth to their daughter, Mai Huggins, at the age of 20.

Huggins has two sons. One of her sons is Rasa Sun Mott, whom she had with James Mott, lead singer of the Lumpen, the Black Panthers singing group.

In 2007, Huggins stated in an interview that Huey Newton repeatedly raped her and threatened that if she told anyone he would hurt her children.

== Bibliography ==
- Huggins, Ericka; Newton, Huey P. (1975). Insights and Poems. San Francisco: City Lights.
