= Alex Rackley =

American murdered Black activist (1949–1969)

- Born: June 2, 1949; Jacksonville, Florida, U.S.
- Died: May 20, 1969 (aged 19); Middlefield, Connecticut, U.S.
- Organization: Black Panther Party
- Known for: Murder that led to New Haven Black Panther trials

Alex Rackley (June 2, 1949 – May 20, 1969) was an American activist who was a member of the New York chapter of the Black Panther Party (BPP) in the late-1960s. In May 1969, Rackley was suspected by other Panthers of being a police informant. He was brought to Panther headquarters in New Haven, Connecticut, held captive and tortured there for several days, condemned to death, taken to the wetlands of Middlefield, Connecticut, and murdered there.

His killing was the crime at the center of the 1970 New Haven Black Panther trials.

== Early life ==
Rackley was born and raised in Jacksonville, Florida. He was one of eight siblings and grew up in the Mixon Town neighborhood. He attended Stanton Vocational High School before dropping out. In 1968, Rackley left his home state of Florida and moved to New York City. There, he became involved with the Black Panther Party, but his role was limited to giving classes in martial arts.

== Black Panther Party ==
By the late 1960s, the Black Panther Party for Self-Defense knew that they were a primary target of local and federal law enforcement officials, who sought to infiltrate the movement with informants. In September 1968, FBI Director J. Edgar Hoover described the Black Panthers as the "greatest threat to the internal security of the country." By 1969, the Black Panthers were the primary target of the FBI's COINTELPRO, and the target of 233 of 295 authorized Black Nationalist COINTELPRO actions.

== Torture and death ==
In the spring of 1969, Rackley came under suspicion. His loyalty was questioned, and rumors circulated that he was passing information about the Panthers to the FBI. The situation was exacerbated by the presence of two national Panther figures from the California headquarters, Field Marshal George W. Sams Jr., and Landon Williams. The two men had arrived on the east coast in May with the intention of instilling "discipline" into the party.

On May 18, Rackley was forcibly brought to the headquarters of the New Haven chapter of the Black Panthers at 365 Orchard Street, which was also the residence of Warren Kimbro, a New Haven Panther. In the bedroom normally occupied by Kimbro's seven-year-old daughter, Rackley was tied to the bed and questioned under torture. The principal method of torture was the pouring of boiling water over his torso, shoulders, and thighs.

Finally, after two days of this treatment, according to witnesses, Rackley confessed to the accusations. The veracity of his confession has never been confirmed. Late on the night of May 20, Rackley was removed, still alive, from the apartment by Sams, Kimbro, and a third Panther, Lonnie McLucas, of Bridgeport, Connecticut. The men borrowed a car from one of their supporters and drove Rackley to the marshy wetlands of nearby Middlefield. Allegedly on Sams's orders, Kimbro shot Rackley in the head, and McLucas shot him again, in the chest. They dumped the body in the Coginchaug River and left.

== Investigation and raid ==
The Panthers had become subject to police infiltration, as the New Haven police had successfully penetrated the Panther movement with informants, and on the night of the killing, investigators already suspected that some kind of internal party "discipline" was under way. In fact, the "supporter" from whom the murderers had borrowed their car for the killing was being paid by the New Haven Police Department to report on Panther activity, and he called his controller that night to alert the police that Sams was using his car. According to later testimony, officers followed the vehicle when it left New Haven but reported losing track of the car on its way to the murder scene.

Rackley's body was discovered later that morning near a bridge on Route 147. His wrists were tied with gauze, his neck was wrapped in a noose made from a wire coat hanger, and there were extensive burns on wide areas of his chest, wrists, buttocks, thighs, and right shoulder. He had also been beaten around his face, groin, and lumbar region with a hard object. In his jacket pocket was a note to Bobby Seale, the Panthers' national chairman, from Ericka Huggins, a prominent New Haven Panther. Seale had been in New Haven to give a speech on the Yale University campus only hours before Rackley was killed.

After another police informant from Panther circles identified Rackley's photograph and reported seeing Rackley being tortured, New Haven police raided the home of Warren Kimbro on May 22, arresting Kimbro and Huggins. Sams and McLucas escaped initial arrest but were captured later and brought to Connecticut for trial.

== Trials ==
Kimbro and Sams both turned state's evidence and admitted their roles in the killing, in exchange for reducing the charges to second degree murder; although that crime carried a mandatory sentence of life imprisonment, both men would be freed after serving four years. McLucas confessed his part in the murder when he was arrested but chose to stand trial and pleaded not guilty to conspiracy to commit murder and other charges. His and the other defendants' trials became one of the defining battlegrounds for the radical movement, as thousands of re-energized Panthers and pro-Panther protesters poured into New Haven, disrupting city life and school business on the campus of Yale University. Yale president Kingman Brewster, who suspended some of the campus rules in order to dispel tensions in the student body, famously commented that he doubted whether a black revolutionary could get a fair trial in America.

Ripples from the case continued to spread when Sams testified that in killing Rackley, he had been acting on direct orders from Bobby Seale, who had stopped by the Orchard Street headquarters on May 20 after his Yale speech. Sams also implicated Ericka Huggins in the decision to execute Rackley. Kimbro did not corroborate Sams's evidence about Seale, and although the FBI and New Haven police gave this investigative angle their full attention, no further evidence of Seale's involvement was found. Nevertheless, both Seale and Huggins were arrested and held for trial in Connecticut.

During his trial, McLucas again admitted firing the second shot into Rackley's body but insisted he had been an unwilling collaborator in the killing. Jurors listened to audio recordings the Panthers had made of Rackley's whimpering voice during the two days hew was tortured. In September 1970, Lonnie McLucas was found guilty and sentenced to 12 to 15 years in prison. The deliberations of the racially mixed jury, which lasted 33 hours over six days, were the longest in Connecticut history to date, and the jurors acquitted McLucas of other, more serious charges, including a capital charge for kidnapping leading to death.

In October, Seale and Huggins' trial began. Seale was represented by Charles Garry and Huggins by Catherine Roraback. George Sams, the one-time "field marshal", testified again. By this time, Sams was reviled by the Panthers as a traitor and accused of being a renegade psychopath who had killed Rackley on his own and who was pinning the crime on Seale to please his new masters in the "Establishment". It was even suggested that Sams had been in cahoots with the FBI all along, that he was the real informant and had accused and murdered Rackley to cover his tracks.

The jury deadlocked: 11 to 1 for Seale's acquittal and 10 to 2 for Huggins's acquittal. The prosecution declined to retry the case.

== Legacy ==
Although Seale's prosecution galvanized the American radical left and Seale walked away from the trial without being convicted, the proceedings in New Haven have been called a Pyrrhic victory for the Panthers. The trials had exposed the internal strife and distrust that was undermining the Panther movement and confirmed for the public that the Black Panthers were capable of committing extreme acts of violence. The influence of the national movement soon waned.

== Sources ==
- Bass, Paul; Rae, Douglas W. (2006). Murder in the Model City The Black Panthers, Yale, and the Redemption of a Killer. Basic Books. ISBN 978-0465-06902-6.
