= John Huggins =

American activist (1945–1969)

- Born: February 11, 1945; New Haven, Connecticut, U.S.
- Died: January 17, 1969 (aged 23); Los Angeles, California, U.S.
- Cause of death: Murder
- Education: Lincoln University
- Occupation: Activist
- Years active: 1967–1969
- Known for: Leader of the Los Angeles chapter Black Panther Party
- Political party: Black Panther Party
- Spouse: Ericka Jenkins (m. 1968)
- Children: 1

John Jerome Huggins Jr. (February 11, 1945 – January 17, 1969) was an American activist. He was the leader in the Los Angeles chapter of the Black Panther Party who was killed by black nationalist US Organization members at the University of California, Los Angeles (UCLA) campus in January 1969. As part of COINTELPRO, the FBI sent forged letters to Black Nationalists to inflame tensions between the Panthers and US Organization. Lary 'Watani' Stiner and his brother, were accused and charged for Huggins' assassination.

== Early life ==
John Huggins was born February 11, 1945, in New Haven, Connecticut, where he attended Hopkins School, although ultimately left and graduated from James Hillhouse High School. He was briefly enlisted in the United States Navy before attending Lincoln University in Chester County, Pennsylvania, where he met his wife Ericka Huggins. They moved together to Los Angeles and both became deeply involved in the Black Panther Party. They had one child, Mai Huggins.

== Death ==
On January 17, 1969, Huggins and fellow Party leader Bunchy Carter were gunned down by Claude "Chuchessa" Hubert, a 21–year old member of the black nationalist US Organization during a meeting at UCLA. According to a witness, Huggins got into a scuffle with another man; 19-year old member Harold "Tuwala" Jones when he was shot by Hubert.

The FBI had infiltrated the Black Panther Party and the US Organization and created divisions that likely contributed to the murders. An FBI memo dated November 29, 1968, described a letter that the Los Angeles FBI office intended to mail to the Black Panther Party office. The letter, which was made to appear as if it had come from the US Organization, described fictitious plans by US to ambush BPP members. The FBI memo stated, "It is hoped this counterintelligence measure will result in an 'US' and BPP vendetta."

Lary 'Watani' Stiner and his brother were accused and convicted of the murders of Huggins and Carter though neither of them fired a weapon. Stiner is out on parole and has steadfastly maintained his innocence.

One consequence of Huggins' death was that it contributed to his cousin, Ruth Wilson Gilmore, leaving Swarthmore College.
