= US Organization =

American Black nationalist group

US Organization, also known as Organization Us, and derogatorily as United Slaves, is a Black nationalist group in the United States founded in 1965. It was established as a community organization by Hakim Jamal together with Maulana Karenga. It was a rival to the Black Panther Party in California. One of the early slogans was "Anywhere we are US is". "US" was also referred to "[us] black people", in opposition to their perceived oppressors ("them").

== History ==
After the assassination of Malcolm X in February 1965 and the Watts riots the following August, the Black Congress was founded as a community-rebuilding effort in Watts. Two BC members, Maulana Karenga and Hakim Jamal, began a discussion group focused on black nationalist ideas, called the "circle of seven." Hakim Jamal, cousin of Malcolm X, created a magazine entitled US. It was a pun on the phrase "us and them" and the standard abbreviation of "United States", referring to "Us Black People" as a nation. This promoted the idea of black cultural unity as a distinct national identity.

Jamal and Karenga founded the US Organization. They published a magazine Message to the Grassroot in 1966, in which Karenga was listed as chairman and Jamal as founder of the new group.

== Mission ==
Its aim was to promote African-American cultural unity. Haiba Karenga and Dorothy Jamal, the wives of the two founders, ran the organization's "US School of Afroamerican Culture", to educate children with the group's ideals. However, their husbands soon differed about how to achieve the group's aims. Jamal argued that the ideas of Malcolm X should be the main ideological model for the group, while Karenga wished to root black Americans in African culture.

Karenga became the main active force in the group, organizing projects such as teaching Swahili and promoting traditional African rituals. Jamal believed that these had no relevance to modern African-American life, so he left "US" to establish the rival Malcolm X Foundation, based in Compton, California. Karenga became the driving force behind "US."

The group's ideals revolve around what Karenga called "the seven principles of African Heritage" which he summarized as "communitarian philosophy": Unity (Umoja), Self-Determination (Kujichagulia), Collective Work and Responsibility (Ujima), Cooperative Economics (Ujamaa), Purpose (Nia), Creativity (Kuumba), and Faith (Imani).

== Kwanzaa ==
Karenga's ideas culminated in the invention of the Kwanzaa festival in 1966, designed as the first specifically African-American holiday. It was to be celebrated over the Christmas/New Year period. Karenga said his goal was to "give Blacks an alternative to the existing holiday and give Blacks an opportunity to celebrate themselves and history, rather than simply imitate the practice of the dominant society."

The holiday celebration is centered on rituals honoring the seven principles.

For Karenga, a major figure in the Black Power movement of the 1960s and 1970s, the creation of the holiday also underscored an essential premise that "you must have a cultural revolution before the violent revolution. The cultural revolution gives identity, purpose and direction."

== Rivalry with the Black Panthers ==
The Black Panthers and US had different aims and tactics but often found themselves competing for potential recruits. The Federal Bureau of Investigation intensified this antipathy as part of its COINTELPRO operations, sending forged letters to each group which purported to be from the other group, so that each would believe that the other was publicly humiliating them. This rivalry came to a head in 1969, when the two groups supported different candidates to head the Afro-American Studies Center at the University of California, Los Angeles.

According to Louis Tackwood, a former informant with the Los Angeles Police Department's Criminal Conspiracies Section and author of The Glass House Tapes, Ronald Karenga knowingly provided financial and material support by LAPD, with Tackwood as liaison, for US operations against the Black Panthers.

On January 17, 1969, a gun battle between the groups on the UCLA campus ended in the deaths of two Black Panthers: John Huggins and Alprentice "Bunchy" Carter. This led to a series of retaliatory shootings that lasted for months. Later in 1969, two other Black Panther members were killed and one other was wounded by US members. A Memorandum of the Los Angeles field office of the FBI dated May 26, 1970, confirmed that the surge of conflict that left four Panthers dead suited their objectives and more would be encouraged:

It is intended that US, Inc. will be discreetly and appropriately advised of the time and locations of BPP activities in order that the two organizations might be brought together and thus grant nature the opportunity to take her due course.

The Panthers referred to the US organization as the "United Slaves", a name never actually used by members of US but which is often mistaken for the group's official name.

== Conviction and Imprisonment ==
In 1971, Karenga, Louis Smith, and Luz Maria Tamayo were convicted of felony assault. Karenga was sentenced to one to ten years in prison on counts of felony assault and false imprisonment. Karenga was imprisoned at the California Men's Colony, where he studied and wrote on feminism, Pan-Africanism, and other subjects. The US Organization fell into disarray during his absence and was disbanded in 1974. He was granted parole in 1975.

Karenga has declined to discuss the convictions with reporters and does not mention them in biographical materials. During a 2007 appearance at Wabash College, he again denied the charges and described himself as a former political prisoner.
