= Warren Kimbro =

American murderer (1934–2009)

Warren Kimbro

Warren Aloysious Kimbro (April 29, 1934 – February 3, 2009) was a Black Panther Party member in New Haven, Connecticut who was found guilty of the May 21, 1969, murder of New York City Panther Alex Rackley, in the first of the New Haven Black Panther trials in 1970.

== Murder and trial ==
Kimbro had been a resident of the New Haven Panther headquarters at 365 Orchard Street, where Rackley was held and tortured for two days under suspicion of being an informant for the FBI's COINTELPRO program. It was established at the trial that afterwards, Kimbro, Bridgeport, Connecticut Panther Lonnie McLucas, and national Panther field marshal George W. Sams, Jr. had driven Rackley to the marshes of Middlefield, Connecticut, where Kimbro and McLucas had each shot Rackley, on Sams' orders.

Sams testified that national Panther leader Bobby Seale, who had been speaking at Yale University the day before the murder, had personally ordered the killing. Seales was at the Black Panther Headquarter the night Rackley was executed. The jury in Seale's subsequent trial was unable to reach a verdict, and the prosecution chose not to re-try the case.

According to Michael Koskoff, one of the lawyers for McLucas,

"Many of the people in the New Haven chapter of the Panthers were middle class. They were defined more by their propaganda than by their own personalities. And they were young and impressionable."

=== Early release ===
At the trial, Sams and Kimbro both turned state's evidence in exchange for the reduced charge of second degree murder, for which each received the mandatory life sentence and served four years. In 1972, Kimbro met with a parole board and was permitted to attend Harvard University's School of Education.

In 1975, after only four years of his prison term Kimbro became the Assistant Dean of Eastern Connecticut State University.

== After prison ==
For more than 20 years, Kimbro was president and CEO of Project MORE, a non-profit agency in New Haven that offers both day programs and residence to ex-convicts, helping them to re-enter society.

Kimbro also volunteered for many years at the Pilot Pen International tennis tournament in New Haven.

The Rackley case and Kimbro's journey from murderer to one who rehabilitates convicts is the subject of a 2006 book, Murder in the Model City: The Black Panthers, Yale and the Redemption of a Killer by Paul Bass, journalist and founder of The New Haven Independent, and Douglas Rae, professor of management and political science at the Yale School of Management.
