= Nick Pastore =

Nick Pastore served as chief of the New Haven, Connecticut police department from 1990 through 1997. He was noted for using community policing. His policies were featured on an episode of the weekly CBS TV newsmagazine, 60 Minutes.

In the late 1960s, Pastore recruited Kelly Moye to infiltrate the Black Panthers for the NHPD Intelligence Committee.

Pastore resigned as police chief in February 1997 over a scandal involving having a child out of wedlock.

== Publications ==
- Fighting Terrorism: Where should the law enforcement focus be?, Eric E. Sterling and Nicholas Pastore, May 31, 2002.
- Parents Need Support from Cops, Teachers, Nicholas Pastore, New Haven Register, June, 1998.
- Torture Under Color of Authority, Nicholas Pastore, Los Angeles Times, November 23, 1997.
- Rude Rudy Sets Tone for Police Violence, Nicholas Pastore, New Haven Register, September 16, 1997.
- 200 Million Handguns Imprison People in Their Own Home, Nicholas Pastore, New Haven Register, July 29, 1997.
- Malik Jones Guilty of "Driving While Black", Nicholas Pastore, New Haven Register, June 23, 1997.
- So Much Crime, So Little Time, New Haven Advocate, October 9, 2008.

== Sources ==
- About Nick Pastore, Criminal Justice Policy Foundation
