= New Haven Black Panther trials =

1969-71 criminal prosecutions

- Part of Black Power movement
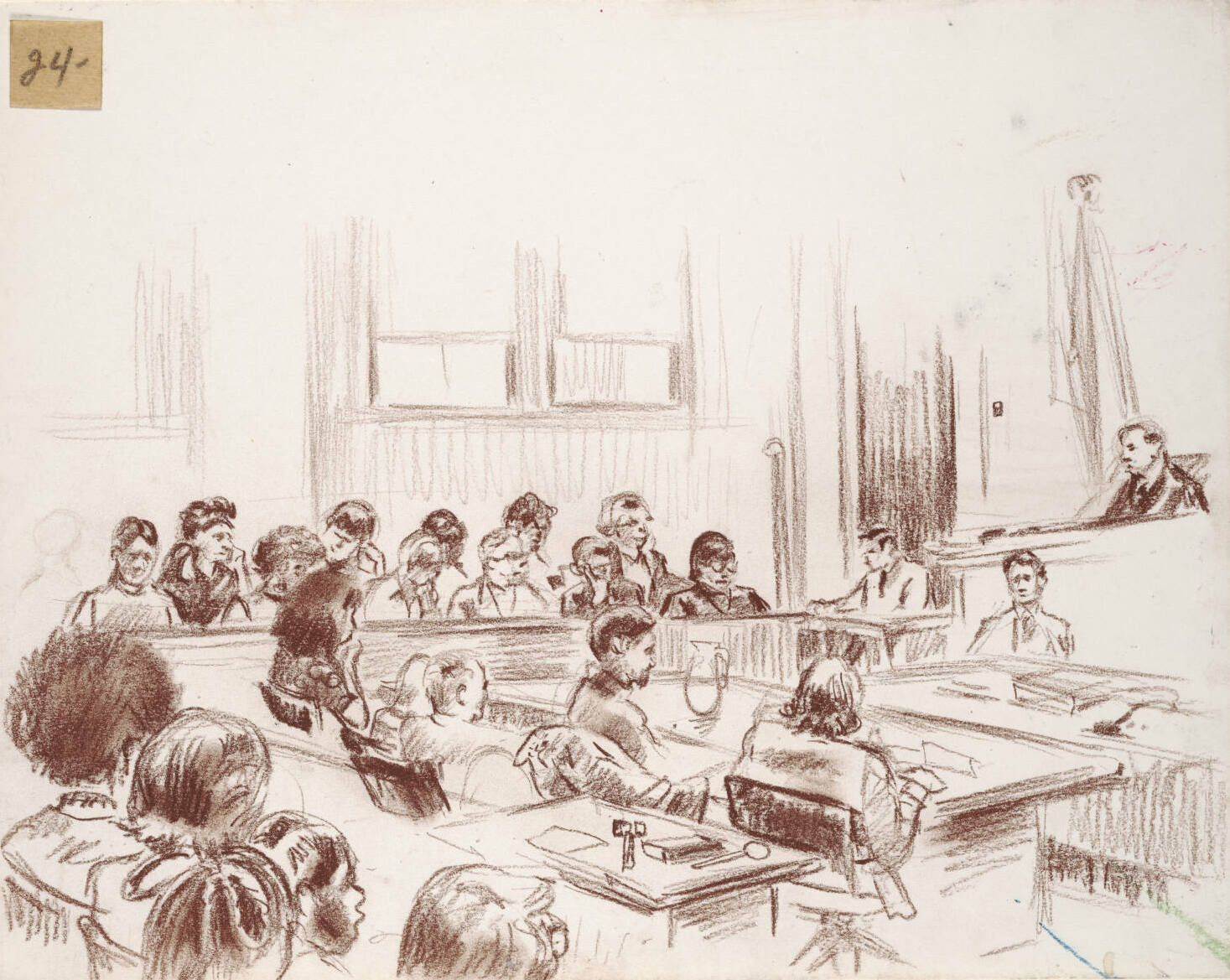
- Courtroom sketch of the murder trial in 1971.
- Date: 1970-71
- Location: New Haven, Connecticut
- Cause: Murder of Alex Rackley
- Outcome: Reactions: Popularization of the trials; Unrest in New Haven in support of the Black Panther Party; Popular distrust of the FBI; Rulings: Lonnie McLucas convicted of conspiracy to commit murder; Warren Kimbro and George W. Sams Jr. convicted of murder; Bobby Seale and Ericka Huggins: all charges dismissed after hung jury

The New Haven Black Panther trials were a series of criminal prosecutions in New Haven, Connecticut against members of the Black Panther Party from 1969 to 1971. All charges stemmed from the killing of 19-year-old Alex Rackley on May 21, 1969, with charges ranging from criminal conspiracy to first-degree murder. Black Panther Party chairman Bobby Seale was implicated for visiting the New Haven chapter of the party at the time of Rackley's murder. The trials became a cause célèbre for the American left in support for the Black Panther Party members on trial and a rallying-point for left-wing radicals against the FBI.

Warren Kimbro and George W. Sams Jr. were convicted of murder, and Lonnie McLucas was convicted of conspiracy to murder. Seale and Ericka Huggins had their charges dismissed due to a hung jury. The New Haven trials damaged the reputation of both the Black Panther Party and the FBI, marking a decline in public support for the Black Panther Party, even among African-Americans.

== Crime ==
On May 17, 1969, members of the Black Panther Party chapter in New Haven, Connecticut kidnapped fellow Panther Alex Rackley, who had fallen under suspicion of being an informant for the FBI. Rackley was held captive at the New Haven Panther headquarters on Orchard Street, where he was tortured and interrogated until he confessed, which was tape recorded by the Panthers. During that time, national party chairman Bobby Seale visited New Haven and spoke on the campus of Yale University for the Yale Black Ensemble Theater Company. The prosecution alleged that, after his speech, Seale briefly stopped by the New Haven headquarters and ordered that Rackley be executed, though he denied this.

Early in the morning of May 21, Rackley was driven to the nearby town of Middlefield, Connecticut by three Panthers –Warren Kimbro, Lonnie McLucas, and George Sams. Kimbro and McLucas were New Haven Panthers, while Sams was one of the Panthers who had come from California to the East Coast to investigate the police infiltration of the New York City chapter. Kimbro shot Rackley once in the head and McLucas shot him once in the chest. They dumped his corpse in a swamp on the Coginchaug River, where it was discovered the next day. The New Haven Police Department immediately arrested eight New Haven area Panthers. Sams and two other Panthers from California were captured later.

Sams and Kimbro confessed to the murder, and agreed to testify against McLucas in exchange for a reduction in sentence. Sams also implicated Seale in the killing, telling his interrogators that while visiting the Panther headquarters on the night of his speech, Seale had directly ordered him to murder Rackley. In all, nine defendants were indicted on charges related to the case. In the heated political rhetoric at the time, these defendants were referred to as the "New Haven Nine", a deliberate allusion to other cause célèbre defendants like the "Chicago Seven".

== Reactions ==
=== Proceedings and popularization ===
The first trial was that of Lonnie McLucas, the only person who physically took part in the killing who refused to plead guilty. In fact, McLucas had confessed to shooting Rackley, but nonetheless chose to go to trial.

Jury selection began in May 1970. The case and trial were already a national cause célèbre among critics of the Nixon administration, and especially among those hostile to the actions of the FBI. Under the then-secret "Counter-Intelligence Program" (COINTELPRO), FBI director J. Edgar Hoover had ordered his agents to disrupt, discredit, or otherwise neutralize radical groups like the Black Panthers. Hostility between groups organizing political dissent and the FBI was, by the time of the trials, at a fever pitch. Hostility from the political left was also directed at the two Panthers cooperating with the prosecutors. Sams in particular was accused of being an informant, and lying to implicate Seale for personal benefit.

=== Unrest ===
In the days leading up to a rally on May Day 1970, thousands of supporters of the Panthers arrived in New Haven individually and in organized groups. They were housed and fed by community organizations and by sympathetic Yale students in their dormitory rooms. The Yale college dining halls provided basic meals for everyone. Protesters met daily en masse on the New Haven Green across the street from the Courthouse, located only one hundred yards from Yale's main gate. On May Day there was a rally on the Green, featuring speakers including Jean Genet, Abbie Hoffman, Jerry Rubin, and John Froines (an assistant professor of chemistry at the University of Oregon). Teach-ins and other events were also held in the colleges themselves.

Towards midnight on May 1, two bombs exploded in Yale's Ingalls Rink, where a concert was being held in conjunction with the protests. Although the rink was damaged, no one was injured, and no culprit was identified.

Yale chaplain William Sloane Coffin stated, "All of us conspired to bring on this tragedy by law enforcement agencies by their illegal acts against the Panthers, and the rest of us by our immoral silence in front of these acts," while Yale President Kingman Brewster Jr. issued the statement, "I personally want to say that I'm appalled and ashamed that things should have come to such a pass that I am skeptical of the ability of a Black revolutionary to receive a fair trial anywhere in the U.S." Brewster's generally sympathetic tone enraged many of the university's older, more conservative alumni, heightening tensions within the school community. As tensions mounted, Yale officials sought to avoid deeper unrest and to deflect the real possibility of riots or violent student demonstrations. Sam Chauncey has been credited with winning tactical management on behalf of the administration to quell anxiety among law enforcement and New Haven's citizens, while Kurt Schmoke, a future Rhodes Scholar, Mayor of Baltimore, and Dean of Howard University School of Law, has received kudos as undergraduate spokesman to the faculty during some of the protest's tensest moments. Ralph Dawson, a classmate of Schmoke's, figured prominently as moderator of the Black Student Alliance at Yale (BSAY).

In the end, compromises between the administration and the students - and, primarily, urgent calls for nonviolence from Bobby Seale and the Black Panthers themselves - quashed the possibility of violence. While Yale (and many other colleges) went "on strike" from May Day until the end of the term, like most schools it was not actually "shut down". Classes were made "voluntarily optional" for the time and students were graded "Pass/Fail" for the work done up to then.

== Trials ==
=== Trial of McLucas ===
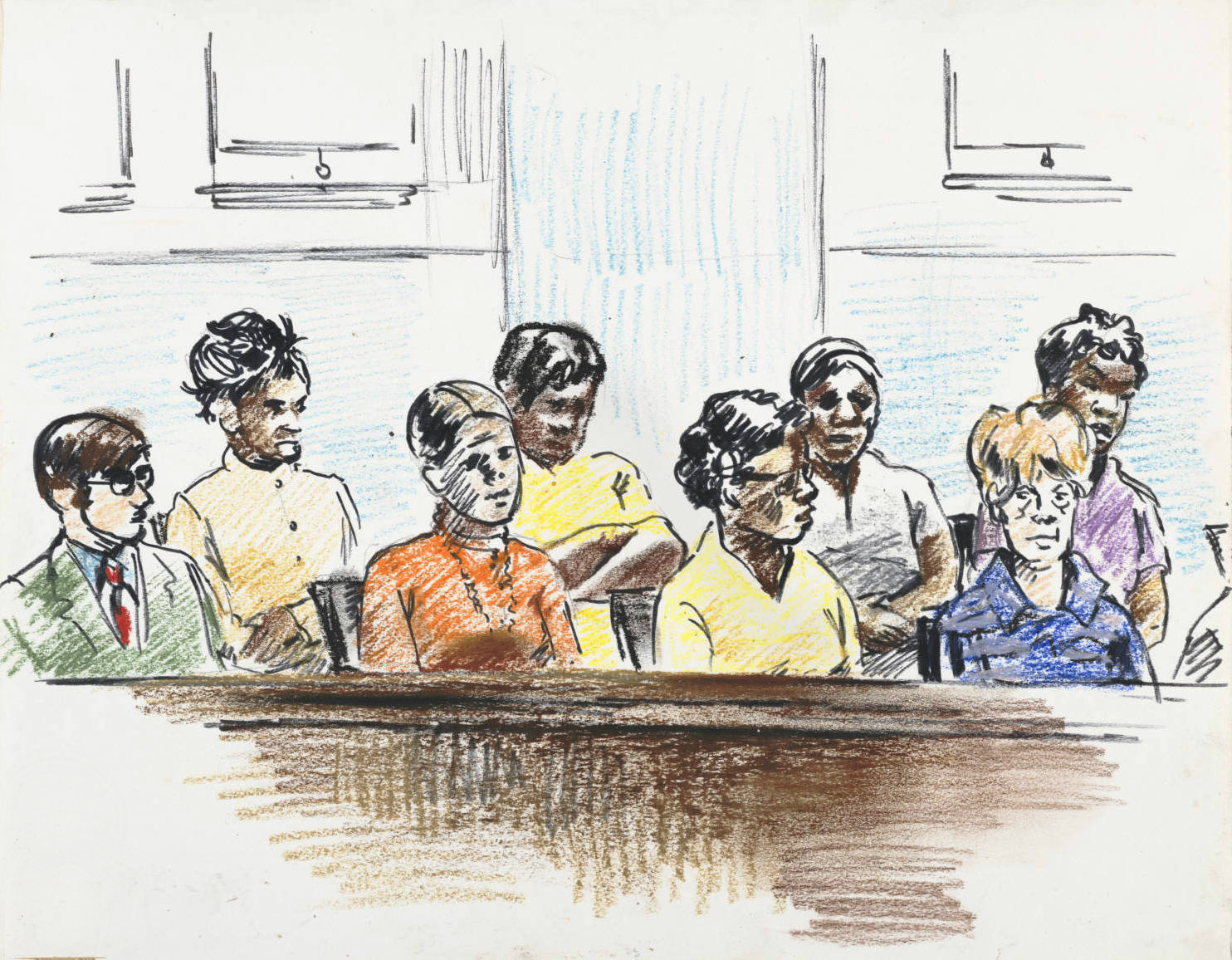
Black Panther trial sketch by Robert Templeton

McLucas's trial set new records for the scale of judicial proceedings in Connecticut. It was the first in the state to have metal detectors installed at the courtroom doors; jury selection took six weeks, a Connecticut record, and the jury deliberated for six days, another Connecticut record. Despite impassioned accusations from protesters that McLucas was being railroaded into the electric chair by a "racist jury," the jurors (ten white, two black) acquitted him on the most severe charges, convicting him instead on the sole charge of conspiracy to commit murder. His defense attorney declared, "The judge was fair, the jury was fair, and, in this case, a black revolutionary was given a fair trial." McLucas was sentenced to twelve to fifteen years in prison. His two collaborators in the murder, who had pleaded to second degree murder, were released after four years.

=== Trial of Seale and Huggins ===
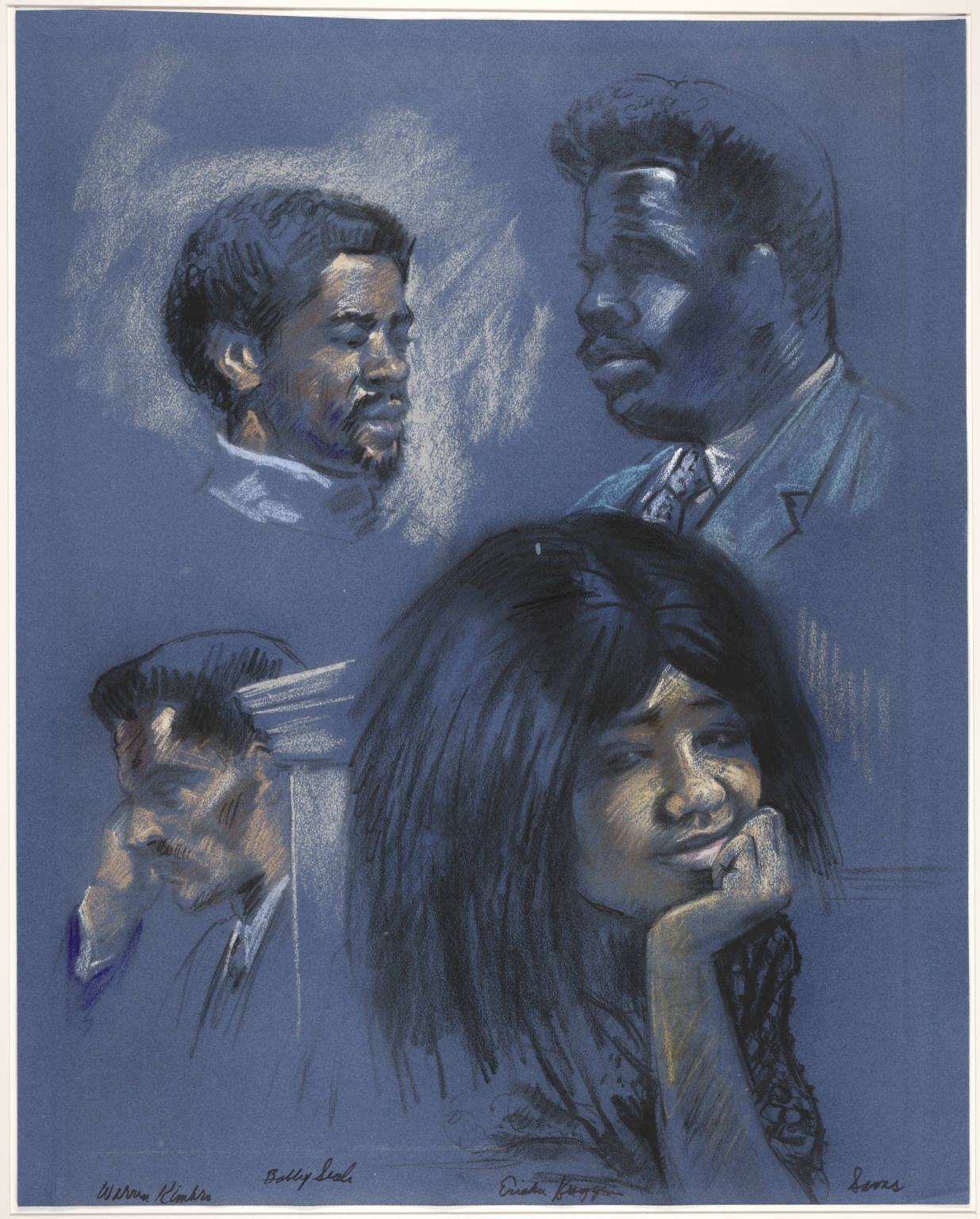
Courtroom portraits including Huggins, Kimbro, Seale and Sams, 1970.

In October, 1970, Seale went on trial alongside Ericka Huggins, founder of the New Haven chapter. This trial was an even larger undertaking, involving a full four months of jury selection. Seale's attorney Charles Garry emphasized that it was only Sams's testimony that tied Seale to Rackley's murder. Huggins's voice was heard on a tape recording of the victim's interrogation, played for the jury. Her lawyer, Catherine Roraback, argued that Huggins had been acting under duress. The jury was unable to reach a verdict, deadlocked 11 to 1 for Seale's acquittal and 10 to 2 for Huggins' acquittal. On May 25, 1971, Judge Harold M. Mulvey stunned courtroom spectators by dismissing the charges against Huggins and Seale, saying, "I find it impossible to believe that an unbiased jury could be selected without superhuman efforts—efforts which this court, the state and these defendants should not be called upon either to make or to endure."

"Ericka Huggins and Bobby Seale would have to stand trial for their lives because they had been unyielding in their efforts to forge liberating actions for Black people. And there were innumerable other instances of frame-ups and similar political reprisals."

— Angela Davis, Ebony, July 1971, page 117

== Aftermath ==
=== Popular sentiments ===
Both the Black Panther Party and the FBI suffered damage to their reputations, after the public exposure of their most unsavory activities.

In 1971, a group of left-wing radicals calling themselves the Citizens' Commission to Investigate the FBI burglarized an FBI field office in Media, Pennsylvania, which was found to be spying on Swarthmore College students and faculty. Among the materials stolen in this break-in were documents revealing the nature of the COINTELPRO program. Within the year, Director Hoover declared that the centralized COINTELPRO was over.

For the Panthers, the Seale trial may have been the height of their national exposure and their popularity among the broader left-wing movement. A string of violent confrontations with law-enforcement, along with the trials and convictions of national party leaders that followed, left the movement spent and adrift, and by the mid-1970s it was largely inactive.

=== Revelations ===
The Seale trial surfaced again in the news in 2000, when former first lady Hillary Clinton ran for U.S. Senate in the state of New York. Anti-Clinton activists discovered that during the trials, Clinton (then a Yale law student named Hillary Rodham) volunteered to monitor the trial for violations of civil rights, for the American Civil Liberties Union. Widely circulated mass e-mails erroneously ascribed to Clinton responsibility for "getting the defendants off," and also blamed the future head of the Clinton U.S. Justice Department's Civil Rights Division, Bill Lann Lee, who was a Yale undergraduate at the time. Although both were much too junior to have had any role in the actual legal defense, according to John Elvin of the conservative newsmagazine Insight on the News, "Insight reviewed biographies of Hillary Clinton by Milton, [David] Brock and Roger Morris for this story and lengthy selections from such other biographies as Barbara Olson's Hell to Pay. Together, relying on primary and other firsthand sources, they unquestionably back David Horowitz's contention that Hillary was a campus leader during the Panther protests"; Lee apparently played no prominent role in any protests.

In 2006, Kelly Moye revealed that he was a police informant recruited to infiltrate the Panthers by Nick Pastore, head of New Haven Police's Intelligence Division. George Sams held a gun to Moye's head and demanded he turn over his car. Rackley was driven to his death in Moye's car. The police followed Moye's car as it left toward the murder destination but lost sight of the car prior to the murder. The State Police discovered Rackley's body the next day. This epilogue was detailed in an article "After 37 Years, Spy Comes In From Cold" by Paul Bass, author of Murder In The Model City: The Black Panthers, Yale and the Redemption of a Killer.

Detective Nick Pastore, who arrested Seale and brought him to New Haven to stand trial, went on to become New Haven's Chief of Police, widely renowned for his successful policy of community policing, and then headed a nonprofit advocacy group in Washington, DC named Criminal Justice Policy. Thirty-one years later, when Seale returned to New Haven to speak at the Yale Repertory Theatre, Pastore decided to attend and even presented Seale with a pink porcelain pig and a hug, congratulating him for continuing "the struggle".

== See also ==
- Revolutionary Communist League (Internationalist)
- List of incidents of civil unrest in the United States
