= Lonnie McLucas =

Black Panther Party member in Bridgeport, Connecticut

Lonnie McLucas was a Black Panther Party member in Bridgeport, Connecticut who was found guilty of conspiracy to commit murder for his involvement in the May 21, 1969 murder of New York City Panther Alex Rackley, in the first of the New Haven Black Panther trials in 1970.

Rackley had been held and tortured at New Haven, Connecticut Panther headquarters for two days, under suspicion of being an informant for the FBI's COINTELPRO program. It was established at the trial that afterwards, Warren Kimbro, a resident of the house, McLucas, and national Panther field marshal George W. Sams, Jr. had driven Rackley to the marshes of Middlefield, Connecticut, where Kimbro and McLucas had each shot Rackley, on Sams' orders. Sams testified that national Panther leader Bobby Seale, who had been speaking at Yale University the day previous to the murder, had personally ordered the killing. There was no corroborating evidence, and Seale was acquitted by a hung jury.

According to Michael Koskoff, one of the lawyers for McLucas,

Many of the people in the New Haven chapter of the Panthers were middle class. They were defined more by their propaganda than by their own personalities. And they were young and impressionable. Lonnie, for example, was so eager to please and so easy to manipulate. If you told him to jump off a bridge, he'd do it.

McLucas was arrested in Salt Lake City, Utah a month after the murder, and brought back to New Haven for trial. He pleaded not guilty to a charge of conspiracy to commit murder. He was found guilty and received a sentence of twelve to fifteen years, but served only a small part of the sentence.

The case later became part of an urban legend that falsely claims that Hillary Clinton defended Bobby Seale and helped him get acquitted. This was not true, as Clinton was a student at the time and not a lawyer.
