= Tim Hayes (Black Panther Party) =

American activist and jazz musician (born 1950)

Timothy Lawrence Hayes (born February 16, 1950) is an American activist and jazz musician. Hayes was the founder of the Atlanta Chapter of the Black Panther Party. Prior to that time he was an organizer for the SNCC. Hayes went on to be a writer for the underground newspaper The Great Speckled Bird, and published many articles in political and musical journals in the 1970s. He also helped found the community radio station WRFG in Atlanta, Georgia. Moving to Pennsylvania in 1973 Hayes was a high school counselor in the Philadelphia public schools. In the 1980s Hayes worked on the campaign staff of several progressive Philadelphia candidates including the Ed Rendell gubernatorial campaign.
