= Bobby Seale =

Co-founder of the Black Panther Party (born 1936)

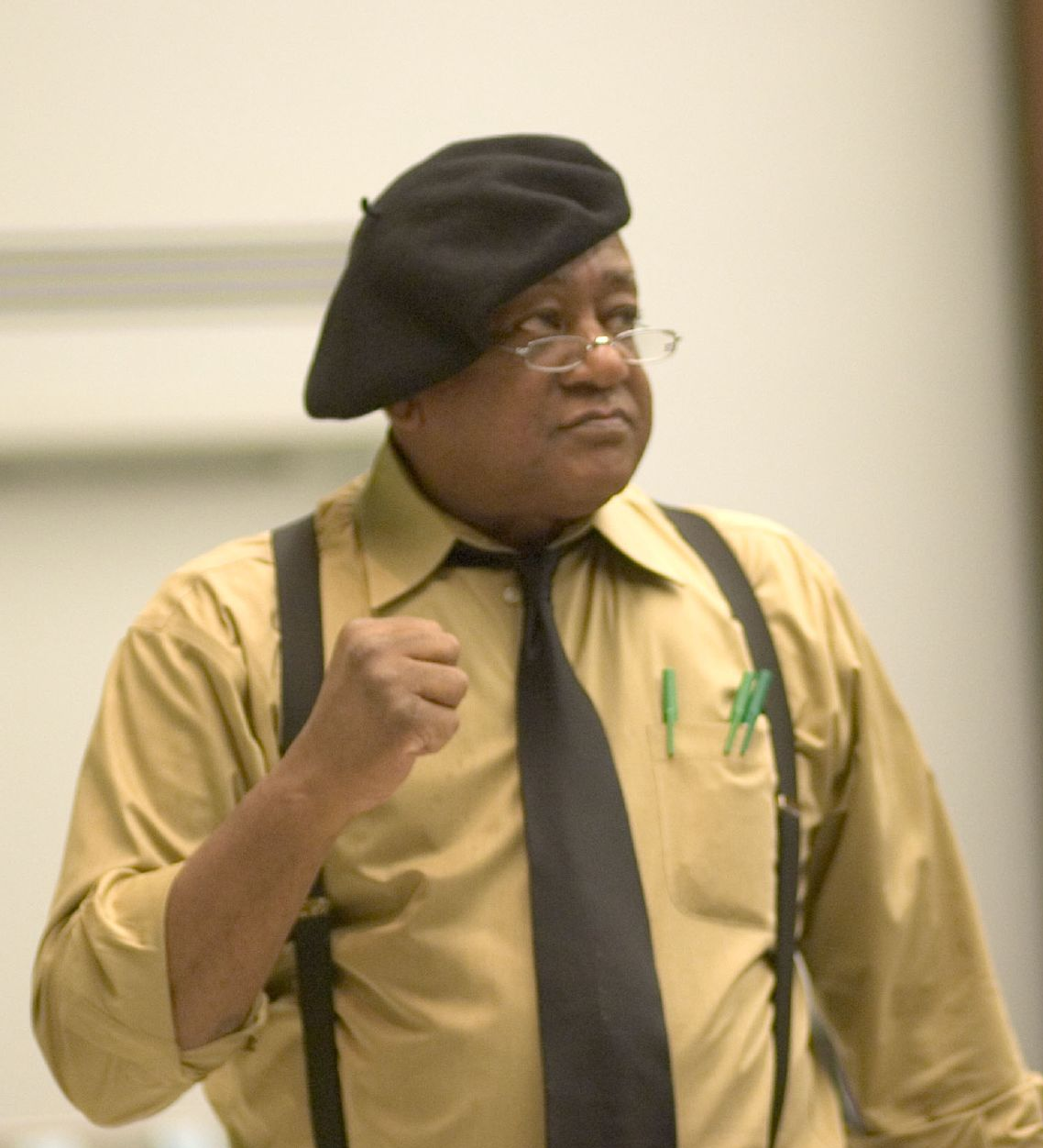
- Seale in 2006
- Born: Robert George Seale; October 22, 1936 (age 90); Liberty, Texas, U.S.
- Education: Merritt College
- Notable work: Seize the Time: The Story of the Black Panther Party and Huey P. Newton
- Political party: Black Panther
- Spouse: Artie McMillan (m. 1965; div. 1977)
- Partner: Leslie Johnson (1971–present)

Robert George Seale (born October 22, 1936) is an African American revolutionary, political activist, engineer, and author. Seale co-founded the Marxist–Leninist political and militant organization the Black Panther Party with fellow activist Huey P. Newton in 1966. Seale's books include A Lonely Rage: The Autobiography of Bobby Seale, Seize the Time: The Story of the Black Panther Party and Huey P. Newton, and Power to the People: The World of the Black Panthers, with Stephen Shames.

Seale was one of the eight people charged by the US federal government with conspiracy charges related to anti-Vietnam War protests in Chicago, Illinois, during the 1968 Democratic National Convention. Seale's appearance in the trial was widely publicized and Seale was bound and gagged for his appearances in court more than a month into the trial for what Judge Julius Hoffman said were disruptions.

Seale's case was severed from the other defendants, turning the "Chicago Eight" into the "Chicago Seven". After his case was severed, the government declined to retry him on the conspiracy charges. Though he was never convicted in the case, Seale was sentenced by Judge Hoffman to four years for criminal contempt of court. The contempt sentence was reversed on appeal.

In 1970, while in prison, Seale was charged and tried as part of the New Haven Black Panther trials over the torture and murder of Alex Rackley, whom the Black Panther Party had suspected of being a police informer. Panther George Sams Jr. testified that Seale had ordered him to kill Rackley. The jury was unable to reach a verdict in Seale's trial, and the charges were eventually dropped.

== Early life ==
Bobby Seale was born in Dallas, Texas, to George Seale, a carpenter, and Thelma (née Traylor), a homemaker. The Seale family lived in poverty during most of his early life. After moving around Texas, first to Dallas, then to San Antonio, and Port Arthur, Seale's family relocated to Codornices Village in Berkeley, California, during the Great Migration when he was eight years old.

Seale attended Berkeley High School. He dropped out in 1955 and joined the United States Air Force. Three years later, a court martial convicted him of fighting with a commanding officer at Ellsworth Air Force Base in South Dakota, resulting in a bad conduct discharge.

Seale subsequently worked as a sheet metal mechanic for aerospace plants while studying for his high school diploma at night. "I worked in every major aircraft plant and aircraft corporation, even those with government contracts. I was a top-flight sheet-metal mechanic". After earning his high school diploma, Seale attended Merritt Community College where he studied engineering and politics until 1962.

While at college, Bobby Seale joined the Afro-American Association (AAA), a group on the campus devoted to self-education about African and African-American history, along with conversations about philosophy, religion, economics, and politics, including aspects of black separatism. "I wanted to be an engineer when I went to college, but I got shifted right away since I became interested in American Black History and trying to solve some of the problems." Through the AAA group, Seale met Huey P. Newton for the first time.

In June 1966, Seale began working at the North Oakland Neighborhood Anti-Poverty Center in its summer youth program. Seale's objective was to teach the youth in the program Black American History and encourage their responsibility toward the people in their communities. While working in the program, Seale met Bobby Hutton, who later became the first recruited member of the Black Panther Party.

Seale married Artie McMillan. They had a son, Malik Nkrumah Stagolee Seale.

== Activism and leadership ==
=== Black Panthers ===
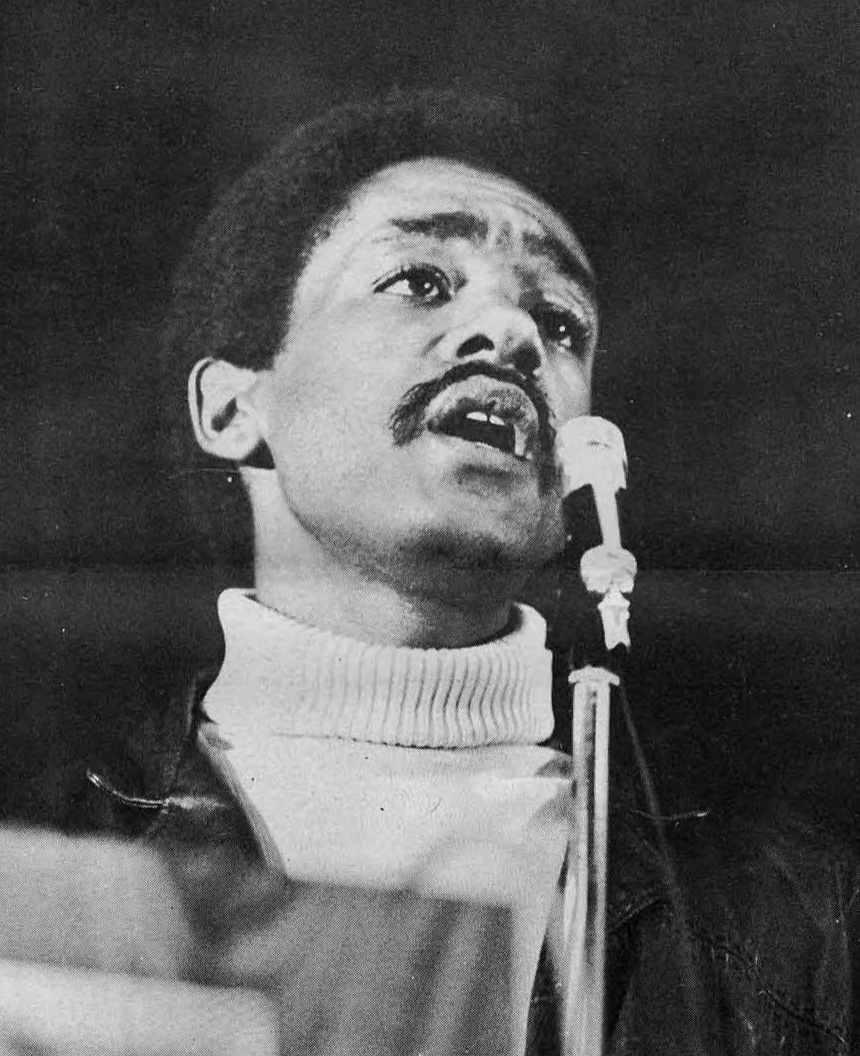
Seale in 1968

Bobby Seale and Huey P. Newton were strongly inspired by the teachings of activist Malcolm X, who was assassinated in 1965. In October 1966, the two joined together to create the Black Panther Party for Self-Defense, which adopted the late activist's slogan "freedom by any means necessary" as their own. Prior to starting the Black Panther Party, Seale and Newton created a group known as the Soul Students Advisory Council. The group was organized to operate through "ultra-democracy", defined as individualism manifesting itself as an aversion to discipline. "The goal was to develop a college campus group that would help develop leadership; to go back to the black community and serve the black community in a revolutionary fashion".

After the inception of Soul Students Advisory Council, Seale and Newton founded the group they are most identified with, the Black Panther Party. They wanted to organize the black community to express their desires and needs in order to resist the racism and classism perpetuated by the system. Seale described the Panthers as "an organization that represents black people and many white radicals relate to this and understand that the Black Panther Party is a righteous revolutionary front against this racist decadent, capitalistic system."

According to Seale, in 1967 he and Newton obtained copies of Quotations from Chairman Mao Zedong from the Chinese Book Store in San Francisco to sell at University of California, Berkeley. With the proceeds, they purchased weapons to arm Black Panther Party members for self-defense against police brutality.

==== Writing ====
Seale and Newton together wrote the doctrines "What We Want Now!", which Seale said were intended to be "the practical, specific things we need and that should exist", and "What We Believe", which outlines the philosophical principles of the Black Panther Party in order to educate the people and disseminate information about the specifics of the party's platform. These writings were part of the party's Ten-Point Program. Also known as "The Black Panther Party for Self-Defense Ten-Point Platform and Program", this was a set of guidelines to the Black Panther Party's ideals and ways of operation. Seale and Newton named Newton as Minister of Defense and Seale as the Chairman of the party. During his time with the Panthers, Seale was kept under surveillance by the Federal Bureau of Investigation (FBI) as part of its illegal COINTELPRO program.

In 1968, Seale wrote Seize the Time: The Story of the Black Panther Party and Huey P. Newton (1970).

=== The Trial of the Chicago 8 ===
Bobby Seale was one of the original "Chicago Eight" defendants charged with conspiracy and inciting a riot in the wake of the 1968 Democratic National Convention in Chicago. While in prison, Seale said, "To be a Revolutionary is to be an Enemy of the state. To be arrested for this struggle is to be a Political Prisoner." The evidence against Seale was slim, as he did not participate in activist planning for the convention's protests and had gone to Chicago as a last-minute replacement for activist Eldridge Cleaver. He was in Chicago for only two days of the convention.

During the trial, Judge Julius Hoffman ordered Seale bound and gagged in the courtroom because of his outspoken objections to his personal lack of legal representation, Seale's attorney being hospitalized at the time. He was repeatedly bound and gagged for several days of the trial.

Though he was never convicted in the case, on November 5, 1969, Judge Hoffman sentenced Seale to four years in prison for 16 counts of contempt, each count for three months of imprisonment, because of his outbursts during the trial. He eventually ordered Seale severed from the case. Proceedings against the remaining defendants resulted in their being renamed the "Chicago Seven".

=== New Haven Black Panther trials ===
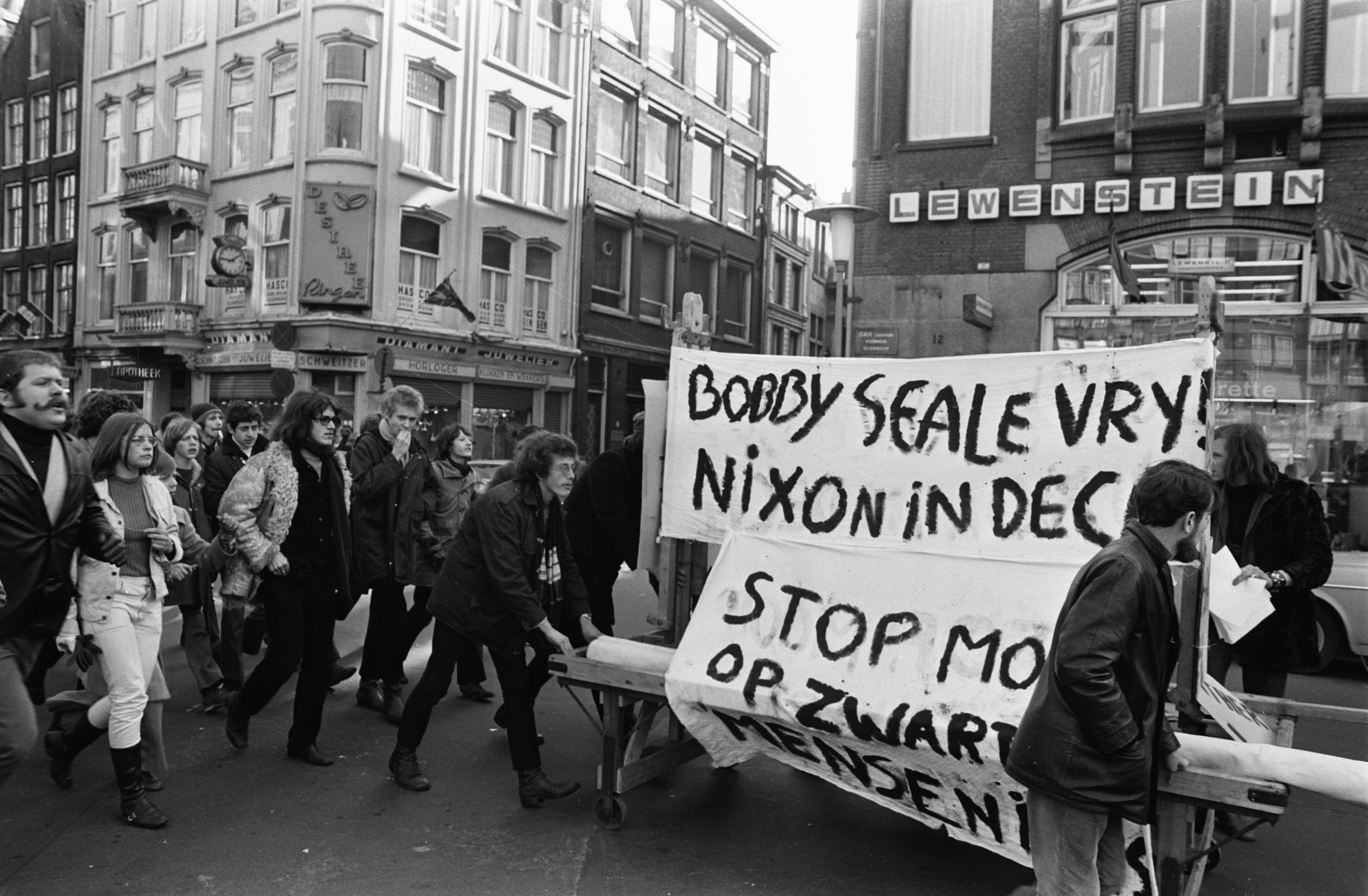
A demonstration for Black Panther Bobby Seale in Amsterdam March 14, 1970

While serving his four-year sentence, Seale was tried in 1970 as part of the New Haven Black Panther trials. Several officers of the Panther organization had killed fellow Panther, Alex Rackley, who had confessed under torture to being a police informant. The leader of the murder plan, George W. Sams Jr., turned state's evidence and testified that Seale, who had visited New Haven hours before the murder, had ordered him to kill Rackley.

The trials were accompanied by a large demonstration in New Haven on May Day, 1970. This coincided with the beginning of the American college student strike of 1970. The jury was unable to reach a verdict in Seale's trial, and the charges were eventually dropped. The government suspended his contempt convictions, and Seale was released from prison in 1972.

While Seale was in prison, his wife, Artie, became pregnant. Fellow Panther Fred Bennett was said to be the father. Bennett's mutilated remains were found in a suspected Panther hideout in April 1971. Seale was implicated in the murder, with police suspecting he had ordered it in retaliation for the affair, but no charges were pressed.

=== 1973 mayoral run ===
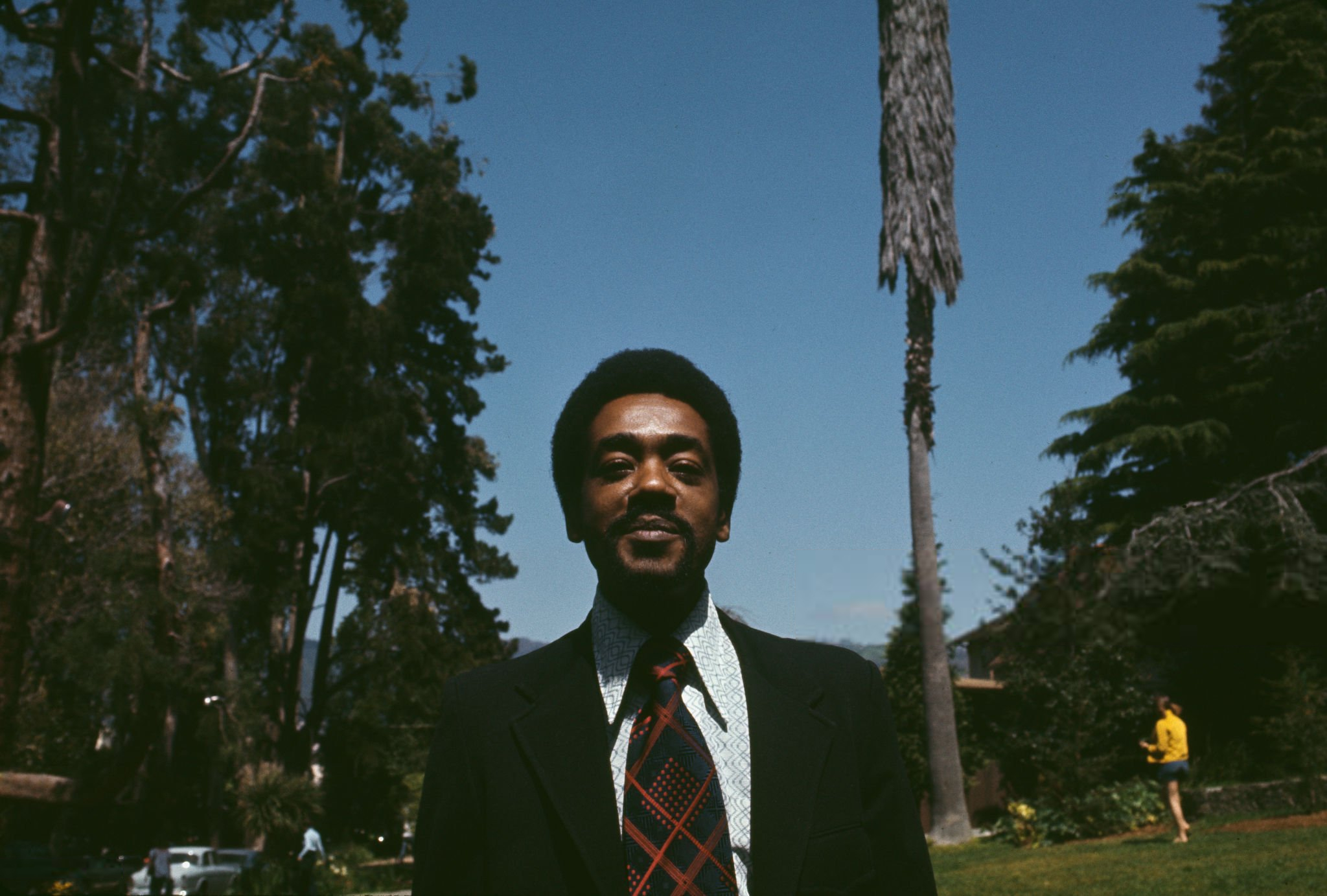
Seale during his campaign for Mayor of Oakland, April 13, 1973

In 1973, Seale ran for Mayor of Oakland, California, as a Democrat. In an election with an unusually high 65% voter turnout, he came in second in a field of nine candidates with 20% of the vote to the incumbent Mayor John Reading's 50%. Although Seale came in well behind Reading, the incumbent fell short of a majority, forcing a runoff election which Reading ultimately won.

=== Exit from the Black Panther Party ===
In 1974, Seale and Huey Newton argued over a proposed film about the Panthers that Newton wanted Bert Schneider to produce. According to several accounts, the argument escalated to a fight in which Newton, backed by his armed bodyguards, allegedly beat Seale with a bullwhip so badly that Seale required extensive medical treatment for his injuries. Afterward, he went into hiding for nearly a year, and ended his affiliation with the Party that year. Seale has denied that any such physical altercation took place, dismissing rumors that he and Newton were ever less than friends.

=== The Ten Point Platform ===
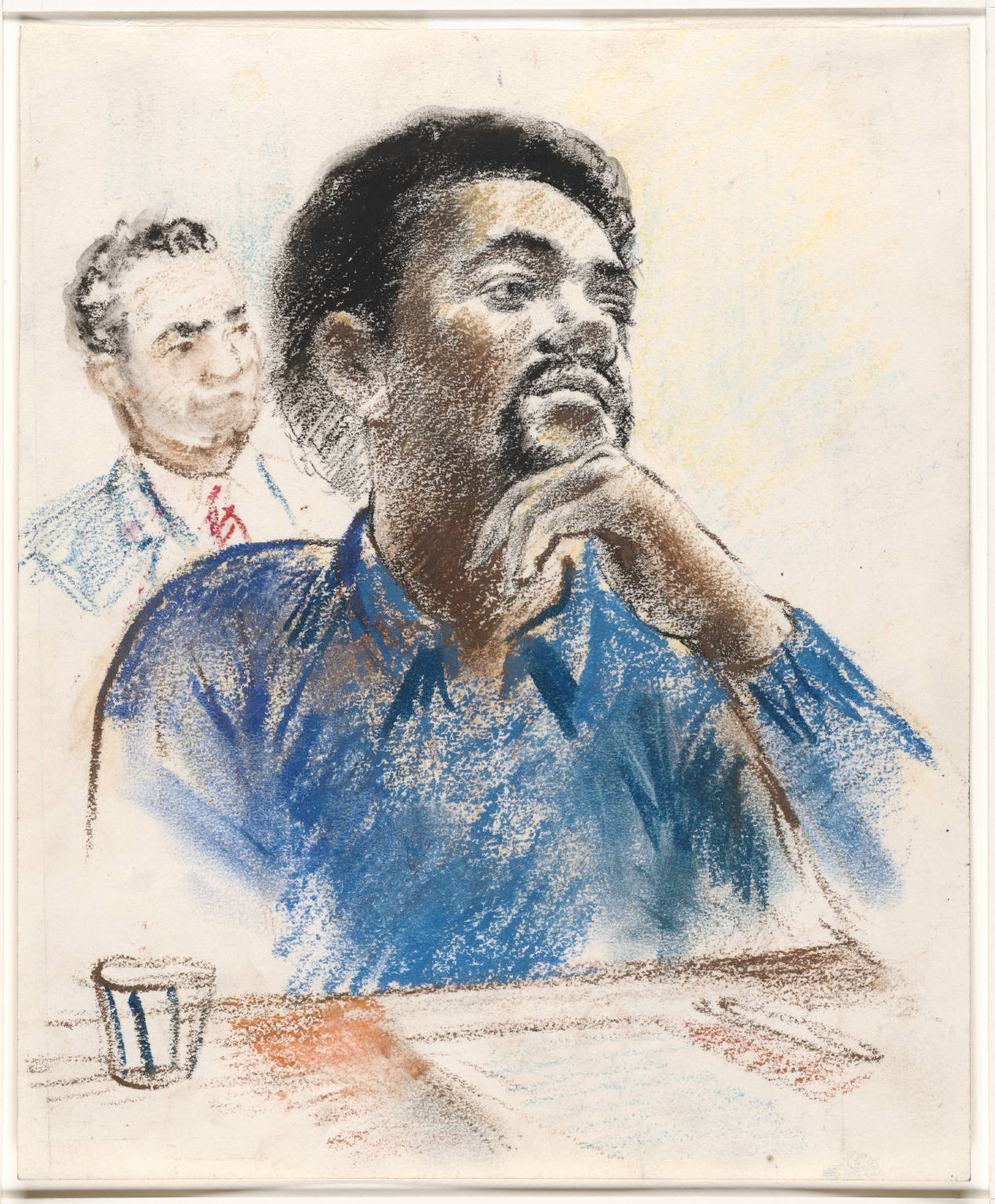
Seale on trial in 1970, State Attorney Arnold Markle in the background

Seale worked with Huey Newton to create the Ten Point platform. It included political and social demands they believed necessary for the survival of the Black population in the United States. The two men formulated the Ten Point Platform in the late 1960s, and from these ideologies developed the Black Panther Party. The document encapsulated the economic exploitation of the black body, and addressed the mistreatment of the black race. This document was attractive to those suffering under the oppressive nature of white power.

The document is based on the conclusion that a combination of racism and capitalism resulted in fascism in the United States. The Ten Point Platform lays out the need for full employment of Black people, decent shelter, and decent education. They defined decent education as the full history of the United States, including acknowledgement of the genocide and displacement of Native Americans and the enslavement of Africans. The platform calls for the release of political prisoners.

The points are as follows:

1. We Want Freedom. We Want Power To Determine The Destiny Of Our Black Community.
2. We Want Full Employment For Our People.
3. We Want An End To The Robbery By The Capitalists Of Our Black Community.
4. We Want Decent Housing Fit For The Shelter Of Human Beings.
5. We Want Education For Our People That Exposes The True Nature Of This Decadent American Society. We Want Education That Teaches Us Our True History And Our Role In The Present-Day Society.
6. We Want All Black Men To Be Exempt From Military Service.
7. We Want An Immediate End To Police Brutality And Murder Of Black People.
8. We Want Freedom For All Black Men Held In Federal, State, County And City Prisons And Jails.
9. We Want All Black People When Brought To Trial To Be Tried In Court By A Jury Of Their Peer Group Or People From Their Black Communities, As Defined By The Constitution Of The United States.
10. We Want Land, Bread, Housing, Education, Clothing, Justice And Peace.

== Other work ==
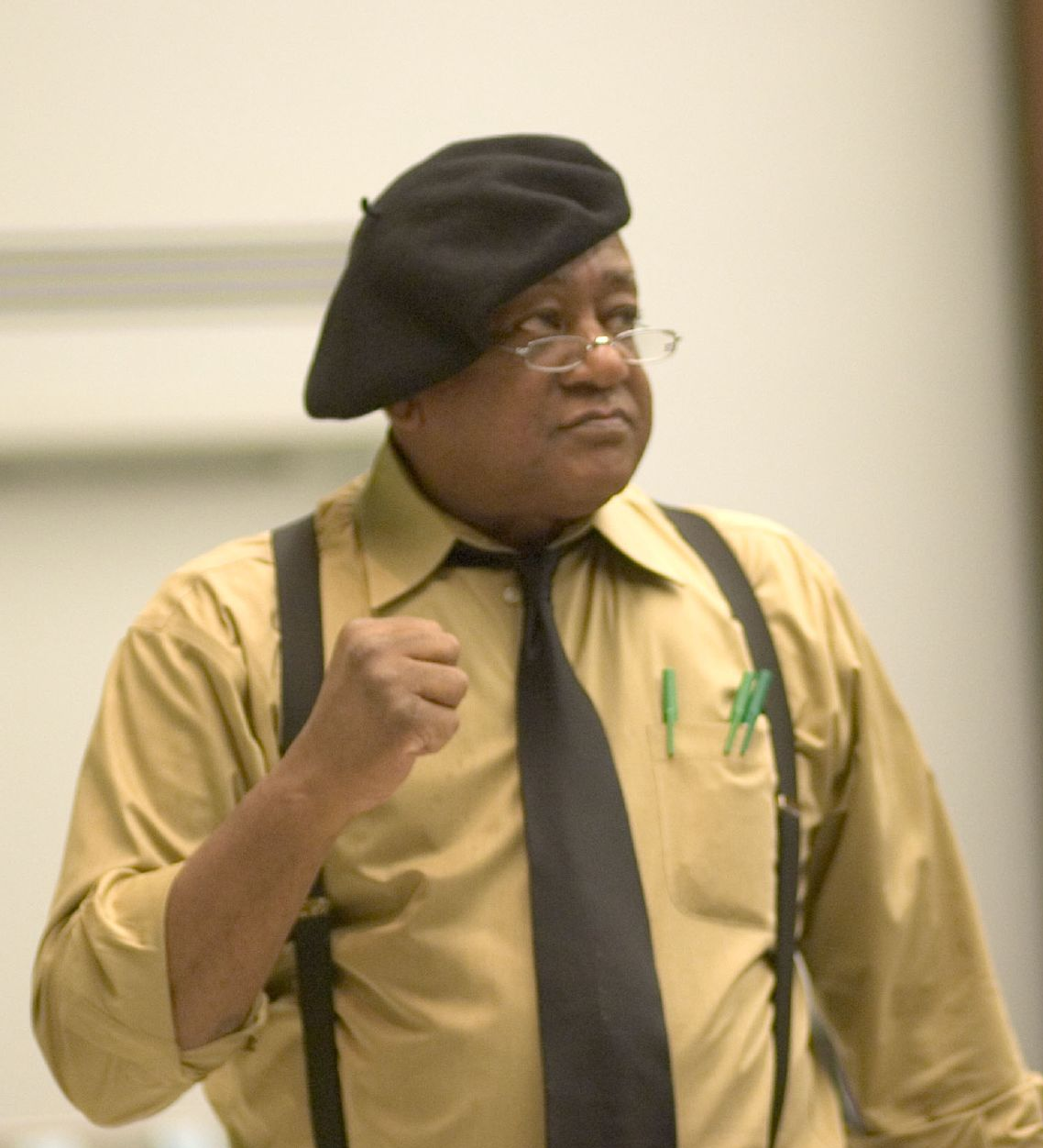
Seale at Binghamton University, February 2006

In 1978, Seale wrote an autobiography titled A Lonely Rage. In 1987, he wrote a cookbook called Barbeque'n with Bobby Seale: Hickory & Mesquite Recipes, the proceeds going to non-profit social organizations. Seale also advertised Ben & Jerry's ice cream.

In 1998, Seale appeared on the television documentary series Cold War, discussing the events of the 1960s. Bobby Seale was the central protagonist alongside Kathleen Cleaver, Jamal Joseph and Nile Rodgers in the 1999 theatrical documentary Public Enemy by Jens Meurer, which premiered at the Venice Film Festival.

In 2002, Seale began dedicating his time to Reach!, a group focused on youth education programs. He has also taught black studies at Temple University in Philadelphia. Also in 2002, Seale moved back to Oakland, working with young political advocates to influence social change.

In 2006, he appeared in the documentary The U.S. vs. John Lennon to discuss his friendship with John Lennon. Seale has visited over 500 colleges to share his personal experiences as a Black Panther and to give advice to students interested in community organizing and social justice.

Since 2013, Seale has been seeking to produce a screenplay he wrote based on his autobiography, Seize the Time: The Eighth Defendant.

Seale co-authored Power to the People: The World of the Black Panthers, a 2016 book with photographer Stephen Shames.

In 2025, the City of Oakland proclaimed October 22 as Bobby Seale Day and named the block of 57th Street and Martin Luther King, Jr. Way as Bobby Seale Way.

== In popular culture ==
- In 1968, Seale was featured in Agnès Varda's documentary, Black Panthers.
- The 1971 song "Chicago", written by Graham Nash, refers to Seale being bound and gagged during the trial.
- The 1973 poem and song "H2Ogate Blues" by Gil Scott-Heron mentions the chaining and gagging of Seale during the trial.
- In 1987, Seale was portrayed by Carl Lumbly in the HBO television movie, Conspiracy: The Trial of the Chicago 8.
- In 1995, Seale was portrayed by Courtney B. Vance in the cinematic adaptation of Melvin Van Peebles's novel Panther, produced and directed by Mario Van Peebles.
- In 1995, Seale was mentioned in The Simpsons episode "Mother Simpson"; Mona Simpson (mother of Homer) claims to have proofread Seale's cookbook (the mentioned above Barbeque'n with Bobby Seale).
- A character based on Seale appears in Roberto Bolaño's 2004 novel, 2666.
- In 2007, Seale was voiced by Jeffrey Wright in the animated documentary Chicago 10.
- In 2011, Seale was portrayed by Orlando Jones, in the television film The Chicago 8.
- In 2011, Kendrick Lamar mentioned Seale (along with Fred Hampton and Huey Newton) in the song "HiiiPoWeR" from his debut album Section.80.
- In 2020, Seale was portrayed by Yahya Abdul-Mateen II in Aaron Sorkin's Netflix film, The Trial of the Chicago 7.
- In 2021, Seale is mentioned in the film Judas and the Black Messiah by a policeman commenting on a drawing of him tied up at the trial.
- In 2021, Seale is mentioned in the Showtime documentary Attica by inmates who stated he arrived during the riot but appeared disappointed Seale only stayed a few minutes.
- In 2024, Seale is portrayed by actor Jordane Christie in the television miniseries The Big Cigar.

== Publications ==
- Seale, Bobby (1991) [1970]. Seize the Time: The Story of The Black Panther Party and Huey P. Newton. Baltimore, Maryland: Black Classic Press. ISBN 978-0-933121-30-0.
- Seale, Bobby (1978). A Lonely Rage: The Autobiography of Bobby Seale. New York: Times Books. ISBN 978-0-812907-15-5.
- Seale, Bobby; Shames, Stephen (2016). Power to the People: The World of the Black Panthers. New York: Abrams Books. ISBN 978-1-419722-40-0.
