= Joan Tarika Lewis =

American visual artist, musician, author and political activist

- Born: Joan Angela Lewis; February 1, 1950 (age 75); Oakland, California, U.S.
- Other names: Matilaba, Tarika Matilaba, Tarika Lewis
- Occupations: Visual artist, musician, author, political activist
- Known for: The first woman to join the Black Panther Party

Joan Tarika Lewis (born February 1, 1950; née Joan Angela Lewis; pseudonym Matilaba, also known as, Tarika Lewis, Tarika Matilaba), is an American visual artist, musician, author, political activist. She was the first woman to join the Black Panther Party. Joan is the aunt of James Todd Smith (LL Cool J).

== Early life ==
Lewis was born Joan Angela Lewis on February 1, 1950, in Oakland, California, to John Henry Lewis and Florence (Reid) Lewis. Lewis grew up in Oakland during the Civil Rights Movement, when it was a hub for civil unrest due to the high prevalence of police brutality, and the continued segregation of the city due to white flight out of the “Flatlands” and into the Foothills. Lewis studied at Oakland Tech high school, following in the steps of other Black Panther Party leaders such as Bobby Hutton and Reginald Forte. Before becoming involved in racial politics, her parents wanted her to pursue a Jazz career, as she was an accomplished violinist in high school. During high school she co-founded the Black Student Union and staged sit-ins to demand the implementation of a Black Studies course as well as black history club. Lewis drew her inspiration for these demands from student activists at Merritt College in what would become a movement of campus mobilizations across the country also demanding Black studies courses.

Lewis began visiting Merritt College with her cousins when she was 16 to attend forums on Black history and culture. Here she came into contact with the founding members of the Black Panther Party, Bobby Seale and Huey Newton, and was inspired by their visions of Black nationalism and radical cultural and community preservation. Lewis also came to be interested in the Black Panther Party because of their Community Survival Programs they set up in high schools and community centers around Oakland. The community survival projects included programs like Free Breakfast for Children, a Free Food Program, and a Child Development Center.

== Black Panther Party ==
In the spring of 1967, Lewis became the first woman to join the Black Panther Party, at the age of 16. She dropped out of high school and made the decision to put her jazz career on hold in order to help the movement. She quickly rose in the ranks of the party, completing political education classes mandated by the party, and training in weaponry. When male panthers questioned her abilities as a marksman because of her gender, Lewis challenged them to come to the range and see if they could match her straight shot. Lewis was later appointed as a local lieutenant, and helped train new recruits and teach drill classes.

Lewis continued her involvement in the Black Panther Party as one of the party's first revolutionary graphic artists, through her drawings and other artwork in The Black Panther (newspaper). Lewis contributed over forty images to the newspaper between 1967 and 1969 under the pen name "Matilaba". Most of the artwork that came out of the newspaper and the party itself is attributed to Emory Douglas, yet Lewis' drawings were prominently featured alongside his. Lewis worked as his assistant during her time spent in the party. Her work was easily identified by its thin pen strokes, and the light shading that outlined her usually militant female caricatures. Lewis' art usually represented common themes of the newspaper, including demonizations of the police as "pigs", as well as depictions of armed Panthers, which reinforced Black Americans struggles against police brutality. What made her art stand out was its depictions of armed black women Panthers rather than only black men, a shift from the very masculine representation of militant self-defense usually pictured in the newspaper. Through both her artwork, as well as her involvement in training camps and police patrols, Lewis created a space for Black women to embody the image of radical defenders of the community and culture. Lewis left the Black Panther Party in January 1969.

== Art career ==
After leaving the party Lewis became a graphic artist and jazz violinist, yet she continued to engage with issues of community development heralded by the Black Panther Party. She toured internationally with saxophonist John Handy and went on to teach visual arts as well as jazz to inner city youth. She also is the founder of the Oakland Black String Ensemble. Lewis acts as an Art Instructor/Counselor at the Healthy Babies Project, where she helps women use visual art to represent and understand trauma due to substance abuse.

Lewis is also the author of Panther: A Pictorial History of the Black Panthers and the Story Behind the Film and also worked on the 1995 Panther movie with Mario Van Peebles. In the film she acted as a consultant, and even had a minor acting role. In 2001 she was awarded the Congressional Recognition Award for "Performing Artist and Recognition of Community Work".
