= Elbert Howard =

Civil rights activist and author

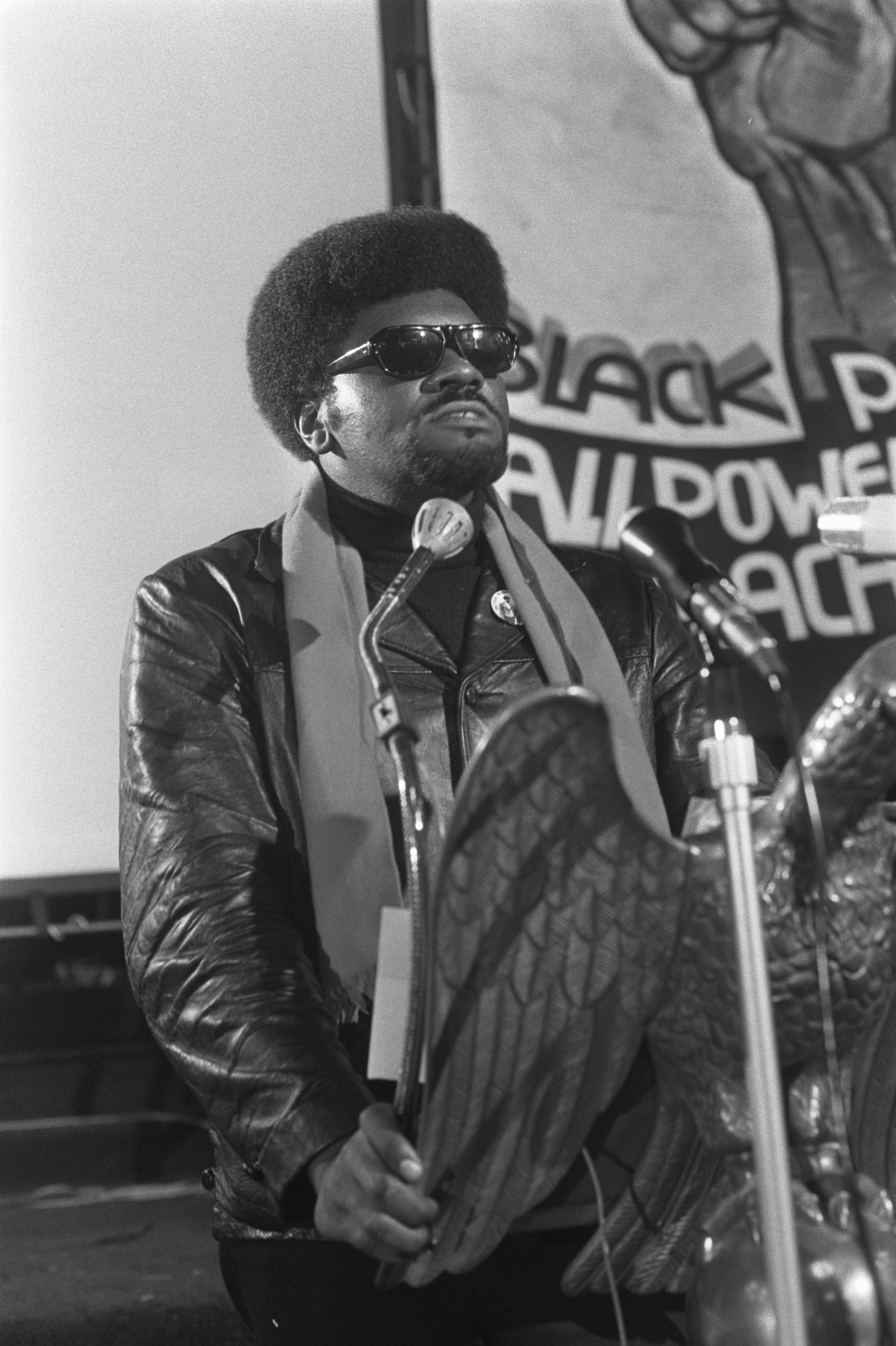
- Howard lecturing in Amsterdam, the Netherlands in January 1970
- Born: January 5, 1938; Chattanooga, Tennessee, U.S.
- Died: July 23, 2018 (aged 80); Santa Rosa, California, U.S.
- Other name: Big Man
- Occupations: Activist, author, lecturer

Elbert Howard (January 5, 1938 – July 23, 2018), better known as Big Man, was an American civil rights activist and author who was one of the founding members of the Black Panther Party.

== Black Panther ==
Howard spent several years in the United States Air Force in Europe. After receiving an honorable discharge from the Air Force, Howard moved to Oakland, California. While attending Merritt College, Howard met Bobby Seale and Huey P. Newton. In 1966, at the age of 28, he became one of the six original founding members of the Black Panther Party, along with Bobby Seale, Huey Newton, "L'il" Bobby Hutton, Reggie Forte, and Sherman Forte. Howard was an active member of the Black Panther Party for Self-Defense from 1966 through 1974, and acted as the Party's "Deputy Minister of Information", often functioning as a lead spokesperson for the party while other members were imprisoned.

== Post-party ==
After leaving the party in 1974, Howard returned to Tennessee. In Memphis, he served on the boards of directors of several African American progressive educational institutions.

In 2001, Howard self-published his memoir, Panther on the Prowl, covering the rise and fall of the Black Panthers. In 2003, he was a coordinator for the All of Us or None Ex-Offender Program, and also was a member of the Millions for Reparations committee.

== Later life ==
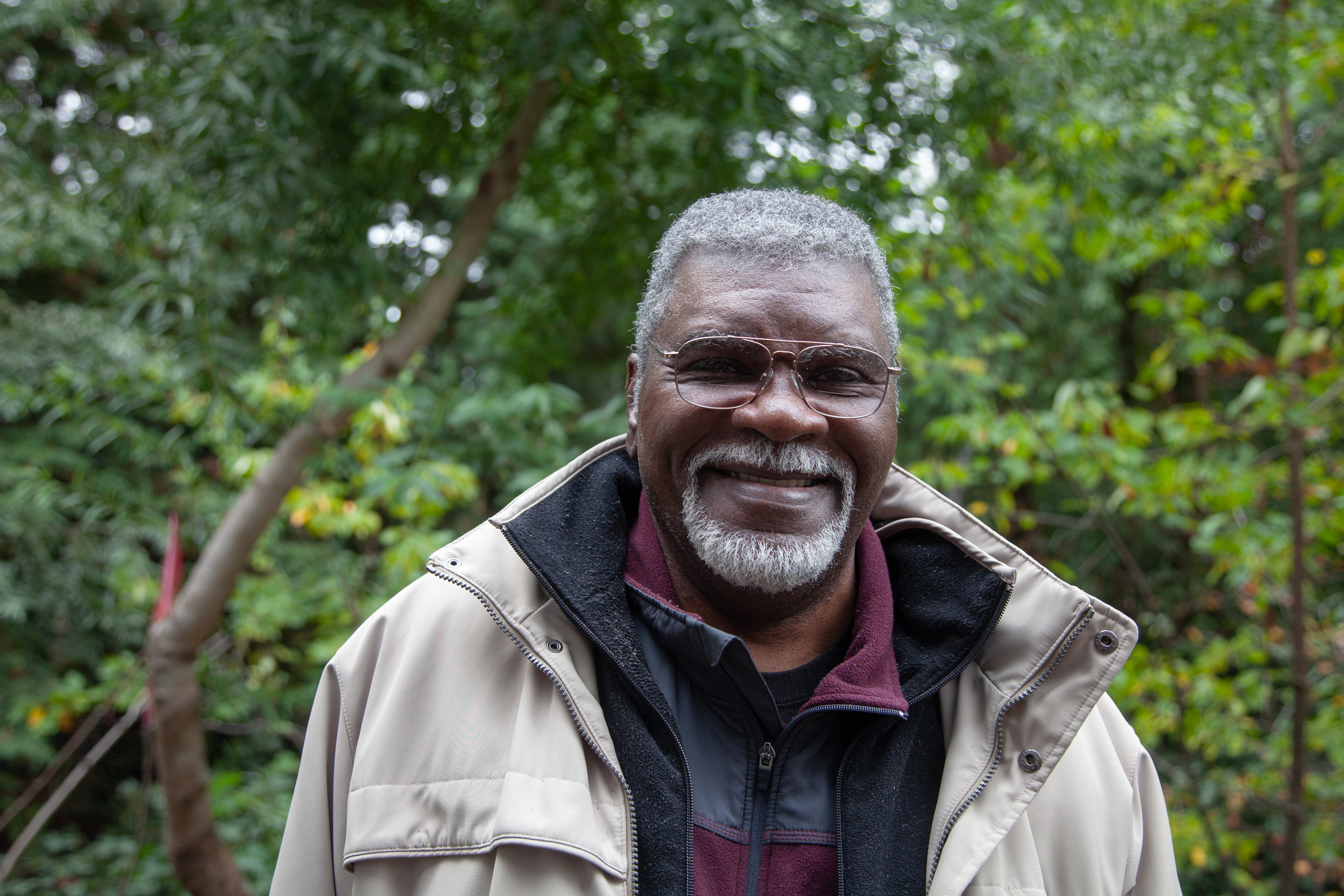
Howard in 2012

Until his death, Howard lived in Forestville, California with his wife, Carole Hyams. They married in 2007. He was a founder of the Police Accountability Clinic & Helpline of Sonoma County, and a board member of KWTF, a community radio station. Howard was a lifelong lover of jazz and hosted jazz and blues programs at several radio stations.

Howard died on July 23, 2018.
