= General Greer =

General Greer may refer to:

- Edward Greer (1924–2025), U.S. Army major general
- Elkanah Greer (1825–1877), Confederate States Army brigadier general
- Robert Evans Greer (1915–1976), U.S. Air Force major general
