= Black Panther Party, Winston-Salem, North Carolina Chapter =

Regional chapter of the African-American revolutionary organization

The Winston-Salem, North Carolina, chapter of the Black Panther Party (BPP), an African-American revolutionary organization, was founded in Winston-Salem, NC in 1969 and active into 1978. The Winston-Salem chapter was the first Black Panther Party chapter to be formed in the South. Along with the New Orleans chapter, it was one of the two most significant BPP chapters to operate in this region. It is primarily remembered for its successful implementation of community service programs, which the national BPP called "survival programs." Focused on improving the lives of the African-American community in Winston-Salem, these programs included free breakfast program for local children, and the Joseph Waddell People's Free Ambulance Service.

Similar to most other Black Panther Party chapters around the country, members of the Winston-Salem chapter faced a great deal of harassment and criticism from the FBI, as well as from other law enforcement agencies, the K.K.K., and members of the Winston-Salem community. All members of the Winston-Salem BPP chapter were African American. The predominantly white staff of the North Carolina chapter of the American Civil Liberties Union staunchly defended the Winston BPP in court and in the media.

Co-founders and party members Larry Little and Nelson Malloy gained important leadership experience with the Panthers and continued to be politically active in the city. Both were elected to the Board of Aldermen in Winston-Salem in later years.

In 2012, the city of Winston-Salem erected a historical marker in honor of the local BPP chapter, recognizing the group for its positive effects on the community during a time of social and political turmoil.

== National Black Panther Party ==
=== Background ===
The Black Panther Party (or BPP) was an African- American revolutionary organization active in the United States from 1966 to 1982. Founded in Oakland, California on October 15, 1966, by Huey Newton and Bobby Seale, the party originally identified as the Black Panther Party for Self-Defense, and called for the protection of Black neighborhoods from police brutality. Over time, the Party's beliefs and objectives evolved, and the Party developed as a Marxist group. It advocated arming all African Americans for self-defense, exempting African Americans from the draft and from all other sanctions of so-called white America, releasing all African Americans from jail because of bias in the system, and paying compensation to African Americans for the centuries of exploitation by White Americans during and after slavery.

At its peak in the late 1960s, the Black Panther Party had more than two thousand members nationwide, and chapters located in several major American cities, including New York City, Chicago, New Orleans, and Winston-Salem, North Carolina.

=== Platform ===
The founders of the Black Panther Party, Huey P. Newton and Bobby Seale, created the Party's platform, called the Ten-Point Program. The Ten-Point Program consisted of ten statements advocating changes that would improve the lives of Blacks in the United States.

== Origins in North Carolina ==
=== Greensboro, North Carolina ===
Eric Brown and Harold Avent, two students at North Carolina Agriculture and Technical University, began to organize a Black Panther Party (BPP) in Greensboro in early 1969. Protests, altercations, and arrests motivated by the unofficial BPP in Greensboro caught the attention of Blacks all over North Carolina, with ideals spreading predominantly to Charlotte and Winston-Salem.

=== Charlotte, North Carolina ===
Jerome Johnson, a student at Johnson C. Smith University spent the summer of 1968 in Oakland and joined the Black Panther Party there. When Jerome returned to JCSU for the 1968 fall semester he called a group of local activists together and along with Benjamin Chavis, Jr., a student at UNC Charlotte, a chapter of the Black Panther Party was organized in Charlotte. Some of the early members were Michael Laney, Stoney Nash, Rudolph Nash, Benjamin Harrison, Cheryl Davis, Fess Bradley, and several other high school and college students The group met at JCSU until an office was opened on South Turner Street, in the Smallwood section of Charlotte. Party members went on community patrols, sold the Black Panther newspaper, and briefly started a Free Breakfast for Children Program. Unfortunately, the criminal conduct of a few undisciplined members of the party prompted David Hilliard, the Chief of Staff for the Party to order the Charlotte Chapter to cease and desist with operations in 1969.

=== Winston-Salem, North Carolina ===
Layoffs, walkouts, and pickets of the tobacco companies by their predominantly black labor force signaled Civil Rights activism in Winston-Salem as early as the 1940s. With rising activism in the 1960s and gains in federal legislation, in 1968 a group of Black youths, inspired by the North Carolina A & T students, gathered to discuss working on local racial issues and to meet welfare needs of the Black community. This group was led by Nelson Malloy and Robert Greer, and the members chose the name of Organization of Black Liberation. They hoped to affiliate one day with the Black Panther Party.

Intending to solve problems not addressed by the Civil Rights Movement, the group sought a "radical reconstructuring of the system." They were committed to change. The group worked for over a year in order to obtain a National Committee to Combat Fascism (NCCF) charter, distinguishing itself from their counterparts in Greensboro and Charlotte through their use of deliberate and meticulous political organizing. As the group awaited their NCCF charter, it encountered a period of relative inactivity due to its unofficial affiliation with the National Black Panther Party.

During that period, the unofficial Panthers worked to set up a free breakfast program, win order to provide breakfast to underprivileged school children, and promoted the sale of the Black Panther newspaper, which funded the group's official indoctrination. The group's official affiliation with the National Black Panther Party member cost three hundred dollars. They did not complete the affiliation until April 1971 due to a number of legal problems and harassment by law enforcement agencies.

High Point, North Carolina

A Black Panther Party Community Information Center opened at 612 Hulda Street in High Point in the Fall of 1971 and closed in 1972 due to constant local Police harassment. A confrontation between 20 heavily armed Police officers and four Black Panther members took place at the 612 Hulda Street Headquarters on February 10, 1971. Police Chief Laurie Pritchett stated about serving an eviction notice, oddly enough at 6AM, to the Panthers, "we went to the house hoping the use of force could be avoided." The 20 heavily armed Officers fired tear gas into the Panthers pad despite his statement and a fire fight ensued. the Black Panther High Point Four; Larry Medley, Randolph Jennings, George DeWitt and Bradford Lily were later convicted. George DeWitt was later acquitted of discharging a weapon during the shootout.

It is interesting that Police Chief Laurie Pritchett was also known for suppressing civil right demonstrators in Albany, Georgia in 1962. The late Martin Luther King stated of Pritchett, during a talk at Stanford University on July 12, 1962, "I sincerely believe that Chief Pritchett is a nice man, a basically decent man, but he's so caught up in a system that he ends up saying one thing to us behind closed doors and then we open the newspaper and he's said something else to the press."

The High Point Black Panther Party Community Information Center was short lived but served Free Breakfast for Children program and Free Clothing giveaway during its short period of operation. Most High Point Panthers who had been trained at the Winston-Salem Chapter returned to that city.

The location, 612 Hulda Street was demolished in the 1980s and renamed Taylor Avenue. Fairview Family Resource Center, 401 Taylor Ave, now sits in its place serving the local community and echoing the Panthers efforts and legacy.

== Membership ==
=== Charter mmembers ===
After its official sanction in April 1971, the Winston-Salem Chapter of the Black Panther Party had roughly twenty members and fifty regular volunteers, all of whom remained under heavy FBI surveillance. Robert Greer, a credited founder of the original group, eventually assumed the role of organization head. Other early members included co-founder Nelson Malloy, who later became a city councilman, as well as William Rice, Julius Cornell, Thurmond DuBoise, Jessie Stritt, Nathanial Shelf, Harry Tyson, and Larry Little, who eventually replaced Greer as head of the Branch in 1970. Other original members, David Bowman, John Moore, Grady(Papa Doc)Fuller and Jackie Peoples.

=== Larry Little ===
A Winston-Salem native and founding member of this chapter, Larry Little assumed the position of organization head at the age of twenty. Little, a high school basketball star with no college education or political background, first became interested in the Black Panther Party as a teen when he listened to self-proclaimed Panthers from A & T speak at a rally. His interest in Black history, and determination to make a change, led to his rise as the leader of the group. (? after Greer's failure to devote himself fully to the work, and success of their chapter.) Little devoted himself fully to the Party and its success, traveling regularly to the Panther's central headquarters in Oakland, and getting the group more involved in local issues. Under Little's leadership, the branch reached the height of its success, due to his determination to make meaningful change in the Black community.

Little was arrested on July 20, 1970, for disorderly conduct, and attempting to incite a riot. The arrest occurred following an altercation with several police officers, who ripped down posters, hung by Little, reading, "I'm Black and I'm Proud." According to Little, the judge at his trial gave him the choice between quitting the Black Panther Party or going to jail; Little chose to remain loyal to the Panthers, and served thirty days in jail.

In May 1974 Little decided to run for alderman on the city council, in order to make changes in the city. He narrowly lost to his opponent, Richard N. Davis, an African-American incumbent. The election generated considerable controversy; Davis won with 646 to 566. Some observers believe that Little's political defeat in 1974 showed that many people still viewed the Panthers as a threat, not recognizing programs they had established within the system. Little sensed the decline of his BPP chapter and resigned as head of the organization in early 1976. Afterward, Little earned both undergraduate and law degrees, determined to have more tools for fighting injustice. Today, Little teaches as a tenured associate professor of political science at Winston-Salem State University.

== Activities ==
=== Community work ===
The North Carolina Black Panthers committed the majority of its time to local public service work. In their earliest years, the Winston-Salem chapter worked to provide breakfast for school children, by distributing food donated by local businesses. The breakfast program was simple but popular, and successful. It excelled at providing children from poor families with an important daily meal, each morning during the school year. Later the chapter adopted several other inexpensive, yet highly effective community programs to help Winston-Salem's poorer residents. These programs included free pest control, a luxury typically beyond the financial means of a large number of Black residents, as well as free transportation to, and from, prison, for those who had incarcerated family members. The chapter's community outreach also included clothes drives, and inexpensive sickle cell anemia testing. They established a free ambulance service, considered to be one of the group's most successful accomplishments because, although healthcare costs posed a problem for low income Blacks everywhere, no other chapter of the Black Panther Party provided its community with a similar program, or solution. The free ambulance program in North Carolina administered Blacks with free transportation, and healthcare. During its final years, one of the Winston-Salem chapter's primary concerns was Black voter registration. According to the FBI, at their most successful registration drive, the chapter registered over five hundred new voters, making it the "most ambitious project undertaken by the NC chapter to date." In 1972, the Winston-Salem party, along with the National Black Panther Party began instituting policies to alter the public image of the party. The Winston-Salem branch followed the instructions given by the National Party by joining churches, as well as engaging with traditional Black community leaders, small business owners, and ministers, in an attempt to revolutionize the community, and bring about change by working through traditional legal institutions. This policy shift proved to be a success for the North Carolina branch, as it directly led to the development of several highly influential community programs mentioned earlier, such as the free ambulance program, as well as greater party support within the community. The previous, violent stance frightened more Blacks than it attracted, costing the chapter a large number of supporters in the community. The ideological change, referred to by Little as a shift "...from guns to shoes," helped the party to gain more support, but still was not enough to allow the Winston-Salem chapter to accomplish all of its goals.

=== Political activism ===
The Winston-Salem chapter of the Black Panther Party raised awareness about its beliefs through its involvement with the Black Panther newspaper. The newspaper served as the chapter's primary source of income throughout its lifetime. By buying the newspapers from the national headquarters, at a relatively inexpensive price, the chapter could then resell them, in order to raise money for local programs, as well as inform the local Black community about Black Panther Party affairs nationwide. Not only did the Winston-Salem chapter raise awareness by selling the newspapers locally, in an attempt to inform the citizens of North Carolina, but they also wrote and published a large number of articles in the Newspaper about local affairs. The publication of these articles united the Black community by proving that all Blacks, not just Party members, were victims of brutality, and encouraging Blacks everywhere to join in the fight.

== Controversies ==
The Winston-Salem chapter of the Black Panther Party faced a considerable amount of controversy for the following reasons.

=== Lack of political support ===
During its founding years, the primary problem faced by the Winston-Salem chapter was lack of support. Winston-Salem may have been an ideal city for the birth of a Panther party because of its large Black population, and potential for Black Radicalism; however, the community lacked universal support. At the time, in Winston-Salem, Blacks made up over one-half of the total population; however, fewer than twenty percent of African Americans owned homes. The majority of support for the Panther party came from the poorer populations, who benefitted from their community service programs. This group was related to what the party was doing, and appreciated their services. The Black middle class was not as open to the radical group, whose rhetoric and style intimidated them and posed, in their opinions, an even greater threat for the Black community as a whole. Radicalism and altercations with police alienated most community members, who feared, and hoped to avoid further conflict with law enforcement. The branch's lack of community support eventually led to its collapse in 1978.

=== FBI pressure ===
The Winston-Salem chapter, like most Black Panther Parties all over the country, caught the attention of the FBI. After a community-wide increase in support for the National Coalition to Combat Fascism (NCCF), the FBI drastically increased its monitoring of the group, doing what they believed was necessary, to defame and discredit the Panthers, in the best interest of the public. In 1971, the FBI developed a smear campaign intended to create problems between the Winston-Salem Panther party, and the national headquarters in Oakland, hoping that such dissonance would lead to the annihilation of the Winston-Salem chapter, although it did not. The FBI scrutiny did, however, lead to other problems for the chapter. Even minor infractions by the Panthers brought unwanted attention from the FBI. This often disrupted the group's daily activities, and occasionally led to the arrests of group leaders.

=== Financial problems ===
The Winston-Salem Panthers struggled financially due to their constant controversy with law enforcement agencies. Although the branch occasionally had surpluses in income thanks to erratic donations, it rarely ever had extra money, and at one point was even unable to secure telephone service in their headquarters. The legal and financial problems faced by the chapter also prevented the branch from undertaking massive community service programs. The combination of these problems forced the Winston-Salem Panthers to reevaluate their tactics. The group decided to avoid conflict, and to focus primarily on community service programs. This transition led to a relaxation by the FBI, and allowed the party to pursue its endeavors in peace.

== Legacy ==
The Winston-Salem chapter survived until 1978, making it the last-standing official branch of the Black Panther Party on the East coast.

=== Party ===
The legacy left behind by the Winston-Salem Panther Party differs greatly from legacies left by other Panther parties around the country because of its successful policy change. Arguably the most effective branch at implementing the community service approach outlined by national headquarters, the Winston-Salem panthers saw their success in service programs, rather than violent revolts and protests, making it a model of what the national organization wanted and envisioned. The branch, primarily remembered for its service programs, such as its free breakfast program and ambulance service, also gave poor Blacks in Winston-Salem a political voice and enhanced their racial pride. Blacks that once lived in fear of Klan members, felt empowered by the Panthers, and encouraged to stand-up, and defend themselves. The chapter, the first to form in the South, created a long-lasting legacy, firmly cemented in Black North Carolina history by the early 1980s, and recognized again in 2012 with the unveiling of a Black Panther Party marker commemorating the positive change made by the group.

=== Elected officials ===
The activity of the Winston-Salem Black Panther's programs ended with the death of the party in 1978; however, the activism of its major leaders continued for many years. Several members of the Winston-Salem branch went on to become leading political figures, or influence public life in some way, such as Larry Little, who was referred to by the Winston-Salem daily newspaper as the area's most influential African American citizen, and Nelson Malloy, who served as North Ward alderman after Little.
