= Denzil Dowell =

African American police brutality victim

Front page for the first issue of The Black Panther, which was dedicated to the killing of Denzil Dowell.

Denzil F. Dowell (April 4, 1944 – April 1, 1967), was an African-American resident of North Richmond, California, who was shot and killed by an officer of the Contra Costa County Sheriff's Department.

According to the media and police, at about 5 a.m. on April 1, 1967, two sheriff's deputies responded to a telephone call that a burglary was in progress at a liquor store in North Richmond, CA. Upon arrival at the location, one deputy spotted two suspects and ordered them to halt. They fled and the deputy fired one shotgun blast. Denzil F. Dowell was struck and killed. The second suspect escaped. A hole was found broken through the cement wall of the liquor store, and various burglary tools were found at the spot the two suspects were first seen. A coroner's inquest was held to investigate the shooting. It was ruled a justifiable homicide on April 14, 1967. The ruling was made unanimously by a jury of 10 white and two black citizens after 30 minutes of deliberation.

The Black Panther Party (BPP) noted multiple inconsistencies with the case, notably:

1. Denzil Dowell was unarmed, so, therefore, six bullet holes and shotgun blasts cannot be considered "justifiable homicide."
2. The media and police said three shots were fired, while the coroner and witnesses described six to ten shots.
3. The media and police said it occurred from 4:49 AM to 5:01 AM, yet witnesses say it occurred around 3:50 AM, around an hour earlier than what the police claimed.
4. Only Richmond police were first at the scene, not until 4:50 AM were Martinez sheriffs seen on the scene.
5. The police had reported that Denzil ran and jumped a fence, then attempted to jump another and was then shot. The Dowell family reported that he had injured his hip in a car accident, and had trouble running after leaving the hospital. Therefore, he wouldn't have been able to jump the first fence, nor run. All of that, supposedly, while he had a hammer in hand.
6. The lot that Denzil supposedly ran across was a junkyard filled with car parts, grease, and oil, but no grease or oil was found on his shoes.
7. The coroner reported that Denzil had bled to death, yet Denzil's sister reports very little blood.
8. No attempt had been made to call an ambulance or revive Denzil by the policemen.
9. The Dowell family was denied the right to have Denzil's clothing or take pictures of his body to verify the number of bullet holes for themselves.
10. The media had announced a "justifiable homicide" two hours before the jury gave its verdict. The foreman on the jury could not read.
11. The policeman had a prior connection to Denzil. He had shouted, "Denzil Dowell, give me your identification."
12. Denzil's mother stated "I believe the police murdered my son."

The event led to a street rally organized by the Black Panther Party for Self Defense. During the rally 15 armed members of the Black Panther Party held a street rally to protest against police brutality. This event helped to establish the Black Panthers in the national spotlight. It also provided the content for the first edition of the BPP newspaper, The Black Panther, which was published in April 1967 with a headline about the killing of Denzil Dowell.
