= The Black Panther (newspaper) =

United States underground newspaper (1967–1980)

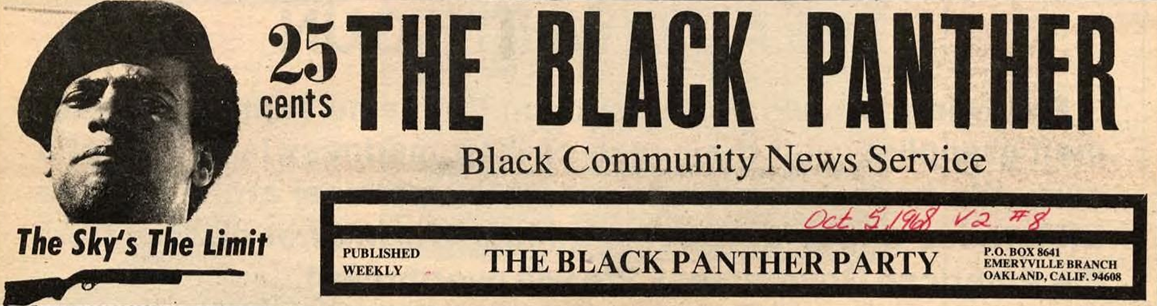
- Front page for the first issue on April 25, 1967
- Format: Tabloid
- Founders: Huey P. Newton; Bobby Seale
- Publisher: Black Panther Party
- Founded: April 25, 1967
- Ceased publication: September 16, 1980
- Political alignment: Black Power; Communism; Marxism–Leninism
- Language: English
- Headquarters: Oakland, California
- Country: United States
- ISSN: 0523-7238
- OCLC number: 32411926

The Black Panther, also called The Black Panther Intercommunal News Service, Black Panther Black Community News Service, and Black Community News Service was the official newspaper of the Black Panther Party. It began as a four-page newsletter in Oakland, California, in 1967, and was founded by Huey P. Newton and Bobby Seale. It was the main publication of the Party and was soon sold in several large cities across the United States, as well as having an international readership. The newspaper distributed information about the party's activities, and expressed through articles the ideology of the Black Panther Party, focusing on both international revolutions as inspiration and contemporary racial struggles of African Americans across the United States. It remained in circulation until the dissolution of the Party in 1980.

== History ==
The Black Panther Party maintained a commitment to community service, including various "survival programs" developed by individual chapters that, by 1969, became part of the national party's "serve the people program" to connect their commitments to basic social services with community organizing and consciousness raising. The Black Panther Party Newspaper was a critical part of the Party's consciousness-raising program.

The first issue was published on April 25, 1967 in response to the killing of 22-year old Denzil Dowell by police in North Richmond, California. Like many stories that would be published by The Black Panther Party Newspaper, the Dowell homicide wasn't covered by the mainstream media, and inspired Newton and Seale to start their own paper. The newspaper was most popular from 1968 to 1972, and during this time, sold a hundred thousand copies a week.

Eldridge Cleaver was the party’s Minister of Information and became the newspaper’s first editor. Cleaver was a major influence to the paper’s language and style, while artist Emory Douglas, “shaped the visual content of the paper through his cartoons and graphics.” Emory Douglas studied at the City College of San Francisco, and became Minister of Culture for the party. He defined his images as “revolutionary art” and would portray the Panthers as warriors with massive armament, police officers as pigs, and made an omnipresence of the black fist. Working alongside Douglas were Gayle Asali Dickson and Joan Tarika Lewis, who was the first woman to join the Black Panther Party. Its final editor until the dissolution of the Party was JoNina Abron.

An undergraduate student at San Francisco State, Judy Juanita, served as editor of The Black Panther Party Newspaper during the later 1960s. In 1969, two-thirds of Black Panther Party members were women and women were heavily represented among the paper's staff and leadership.

In its later years, the newspaper was used to rally support for members of the party who were incarcerated.

After factional splits emerged within the party in the early 1970s, a group based in New York City put out a separate paper, Right On!, which became a forum for the Black Liberation Army.

The newspaper is archived at California State University, Dominguez Hills.

== Format ==
Typical format -November 23, 1967 issue

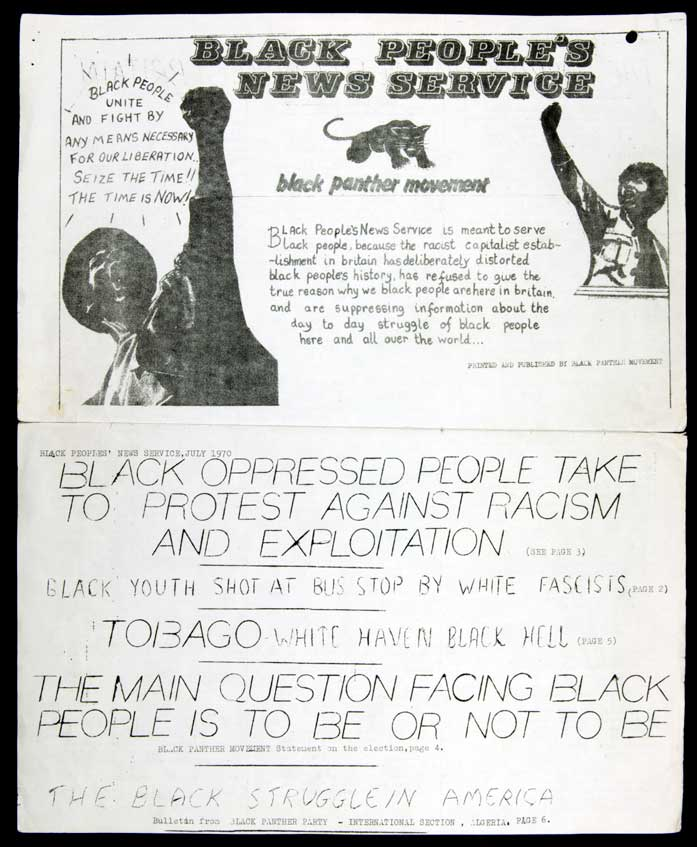
A July 1970 issue of the Black Panther Party newspaper, then titled the Black People's News Service.

"The BPP newspaper grew from a four-page newsletter to a full newspaper in about a year and [537] issues were printed."

Every issue of the newspaper contained the party’s 10 Point Platform and Program, titled “What We Want Now! What We Believe!” The program was a list of the party’s demands that “addressed the needs and interests of the black community.” The 10 point program was revised in 1972, which was followed by a change in the number of images showcased in the issues. From 1967 to 1971, the average was of six per issue and from March of 1972 to 1980, the average was of 2.4 images per issue. After 1972, there was also a decrease in the number of contributing artists.

== Circulation ==
Circulation was national and international. From 1968 to 1971, The Black Panther Party Newspaper was the most widely read Black newspaper in the United States, with a weekly circulation of more than 300,000. It sold for 25 cents, with the party’s national headquarters receiving about “about 12.5 cents for each copy sold.” The newspaper became the party’s most stable income source, and by 1970, it was making a net of $40,000 a month for the party.

Every Panther was required to read and study the newspaper before they could sell it. As it became nationally circulated, The Black Panther Party Newspaper national distribution center was located in San Francisco, with a distribution team led by Andrew Austin, Sam Napier, and Ellis White. Other distribution centers were in Chicago, Kansas, Los Angeles, New York, and Seattle.

== 50th Anniversary Commemorative Issue ==
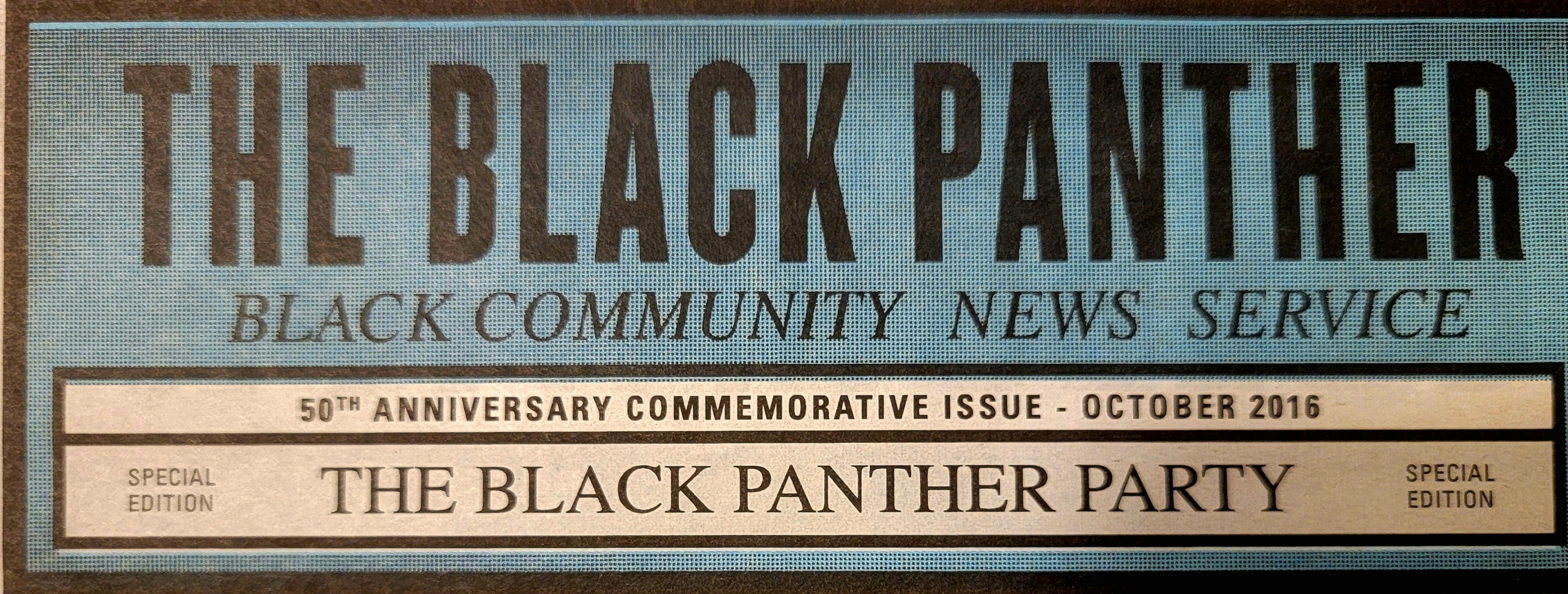
The Black Panther 50th Anniversary Commemorative Issue logo

In October, 2016, the Oakland Museum of California, in cooperation with about 100 former members of the Black Panther Party, organized an exhibit commemorating the 50th anniversary of the founding of the party. The exhibit ran through February, 2017 and was called " All Power to the People: Black Panthers at 50". As part of the commemoration, a 20 page issue of The Black Panther was published.

== See also ==
- List of underground newspapers of the 1960s counterculture
