= Black Panther Party =

American political organization (1966–1982)

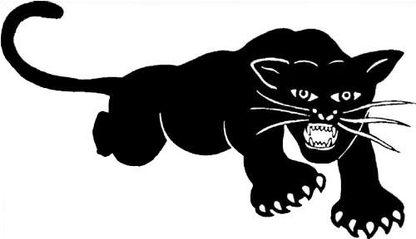
- Abbreviation: BPP
- Leader: Huey P. Newton
- Founded: October 1966; 60 years ago
- Dissolved: 1982; 44 years ago
- Split from: Afro-American Association
- Preceded by: Lowndes County Freedom Organization (unofficial)
- Succeeded by: Unofficial: NBPP; BPM; NPVM; RBPP; BRLP; NABPP
- Headquarters: Oakland, California
- Newspaper: The Black Panther
- Membership: approx. 5,000 (1969 est.)
- Ideology: Black nationalism (early); Revolutionary nationalism; Black Power; Marxism–Leninism; Maoism; Revolutionary socialism; Gun rights; Womanism; Anti-imperialism; Intercommunalism (later)
- Political position: Left-wing
- National affiliation: Rainbow Coalition
- Colors: Black
- Slogan: "All Power to the People"

The Black Panther Party (BPP), formerly the Black Panther Party for Self-Defense, was an American Marxist–Leninist, black power political and militant organization from 1966 to 1982, founded and led by Huey P. Newton and Bobby Seale. Between 1968 and 1971, it was a nationwide organization with chapters in many major cities, and members were active in many prisons and the party had international chapters in the United Kingdom and Algeria. The party first drew attention for openly carrying firearms in Oakland, California while monitoring police activity; resultantly, members were involved in multiple fatal firefights with police. Its earliest goal was to challenge the excessive force and misconduct of the Oakland Police Department that affected the African American community during the civil rights movement. It advocated for decent housing, community control of education and police, exemption from military service for black men during the Vietnam War, and free breakfast for children. The party's dissolution led to various splinter groups and successor organizations.

In 1969, J. Edgar Hoover, the director of the Federal Bureau of Investigation (FBI), described the Black Panther Party as "the greatest threat to the internal security of the country." The FBI sabotaged the party with an illegal and covert counterintelligence program (COINTELPRO) of surveillance, infiltration, perjury, and police harassment, all designed to undermine and criminalize the party. The FBI was involved in the 1969 assassinations of party members Fred Hampton and Mark Clark, who were killed in a raid by the Chicago Police Department. Huey P. Newton allegedly killed officer John Frey in 1967, and Minister of Information Eldridge Cleaver led an ambush in 1968 of Oakland police officers, in which two officers were wounded and Panther treasurer Bobby Hutton was killed. The party suffered many internal conflicts, resulting in the murders of members including Betty Van Patter and Alex Rackley.

Government persecution initially contributed to the party's growth among African Americans and the American left, who both valued the party as a powerful force against de facto segregation and the U.S. military draft during the Vietnam War. Party membership peaked in 1970 and gradually declined over the next decade, due to vilification by the mainstream press and infighting largely fomented by COINTELPRO. Support further declined over reports of the party's alleged criminal activities, such as drug dealing and extortion.

The party's legacy is controversial. Older historical work described the party as more criminal than political, characterized by "defiant posturing over substance." Other assessments described the party as "mainly victims of a repressive state." These older assessments have been criticized as incomplete. Joshua Bloom and Waldo Martin characterized the Black Panther Party as one of the most influential black power organization of the late 1960s, with an "eventually tragic evolution" - collapsing due to infighting, often partly initiated by the government.

== History ==
=== Origins ===
Original six members of the Black Panther Party (1966): Top left to right: Elbert "Big Man" Howard, Huey P. Newton (Defense Minister), Sherwin Forte, Bobby Seale (Chairman); Bottom: Reggie Forte and Little Bobby Hutton (Treasurer).

Newsreel from 1968 in which Kathleen Cleaver speaks at Hutton Memorial Park in Alameda County, California. The footage also shows a student protest demonstration at Alameda County Courthouse, Oakland, California. Black Panther Party leaders Huey P. Newton, Eldridge Cleaver, and Bobby Seale spoke on a 10-point program they wanted from the administration which was to include full employment, decent housing and education, an end to police brutality, and black people to be exempt from the military. Black Panther Party members are shown as they marched in uniform. Students at the rally marched, sang, clapped hands, and carried protest signs. Police in riot gear controlled marchers.

During World War II, tens of thousands of black people left the Southern states during the Second Great Migration, moving to Oakland and other cities in the Bay Area to find work in the war industries such as Kaiser Shipyards. The sweeping migration transformed the Bay Area as well as cities throughout the West and North, altering the once white-dominated demographics. A new generation of young black people growing up in these cities faced new forms of poverty and racism unfamiliar to their parents, and they sought to develop new forms of politics to address them. Black Panther Party membership "consisted of recent migrants whose families traveled north and west to escape the southern racial regime, only to be confronted with new forms of segregation and repression". In the early 1960s, the Civil rights movement had dismantled the Jim Crow system of racial subordination in the South with tactics of non-violent civil disobedience, and demanding full citizenship rights for black people. However, not much changed in the cities of the North and West. As the wartime and post-war jobs which drew much of the black migration "fled to the suburbs along with white residents", the black population was concentrated in poor "urban ghettos" with high unemployment and substandard housing and was mostly excluded from political representation, top universities, and the middle class. Northern and Western police departments were almost all white. In 1966, only 16 of Oakland's 661 police officers were African American (less than 2.5%).

Civil rights tactics proved incapable of redressing these conditions, and the organizations that had "led much of the nonviolent civil disobedience", such as SNCC and CORE, went into decline. By 1966 a "Black Power ferment" emerged, consisting largely of young urban black people, posing a question the Civil Rights Movement could not answer: "How would black people in America win not only formal citizenship rights, but actual economic and political power?" Young black people in Oakland and other cities developed study groups and political organizations, and from this ferment the Black Panther Party emerged.

=== Founding ===
In late October 1966, Huey P. Newton and Bobby Seale founded the Black Panther Party (originally the Black Panther Party for Self-Defense). In formulating a new politics, they drew on their work with a variety of Black Power organizations. Newton and Seale first met in 1962 when they were both students at Merritt College. They joined Donald Warden's Afro-American Association (AAA), where they read widely, debated, and organized in an emergent black nationalist tradition inspired by Malcolm X and others. Eventually dissatisfied with Warden's accommodationism, the two split from AAA after they developed a revolutionary anti-imperialist perspective from working with more active and militant groups like the Soul Students Advisory Council and the Revolutionary Action Movement. Their paid jobs running youth service programs at the North Oakland Neighborhood Anti-Poverty Center allowed them to develop a revolutionary nationalist approach to community service, later a key element in the Black Panther Party's "community survival programs."

Dissatisfied with the failure of these organizations to directly challenge police brutality and appeal to the "brothers on the block", Huey and Bobby took matters into their own hands. After the police killed Matthew Johnson, an unarmed young black man in San Francisco, Newton observed the violent insurrection that followed. He had an epiphany that would distinguish the Black Panther Party from the multitude of Black Power organizations. Newton saw the explosive rebellious anger of the ghetto as a social force and believed that if he could stand up to the police, he could organize that force into political power. Inspired by Robert F. Williams' armed resistance to the Ku Klux Klan (KKK) and Williams' book Negroes with Guns, Newton studied gun laws in California extensively. Like the Community Alert Patrol in Los Angeles after the Watts Rebellion, he decided to organize patrols to follow the police around to monitor for incidents of brutality. But with a crucial difference: his patrols would carry loaded guns. Huey and Bobby raised enough money to buy two shotguns by buying bulk quantities of the recently publicized Mao Zedong's Little Red Book and reselling them to communists and socialists on the Berkeley campus at three times the price. According to Bobby Seale, they would "sell the books, make the money, buy the guns, and go on the streets with the guns. We'll protect a mother, protect a brother, and protect the community from the racist cops."

On October 29, 1966, Stokely Carmichael (a leader of SNCC) championed the call for "Black Power" and came to Berkeley to keynote a Black Power conference. At the time, he was promoting the armed organizing efforts of the Lowndes County Freedom Organization (LCFO) in Alabama and their use of the Black Panther symbol, which had been adapted by Ruth Howard from the black panther mascot of the historically black Clark College and later redrawn by Dorothy Zellner. Newton and Seale decided to adopt the Black Panther logo and form their own organization called the Black Panther Party for Self-Defense. Newton and Seale decided on a uniform of blue shirts, black pants, black leather jackets, black berets, the latter adopted as an homage to Che Guevara. Sixteen-year-old Bobby Hutton was their first recruit.

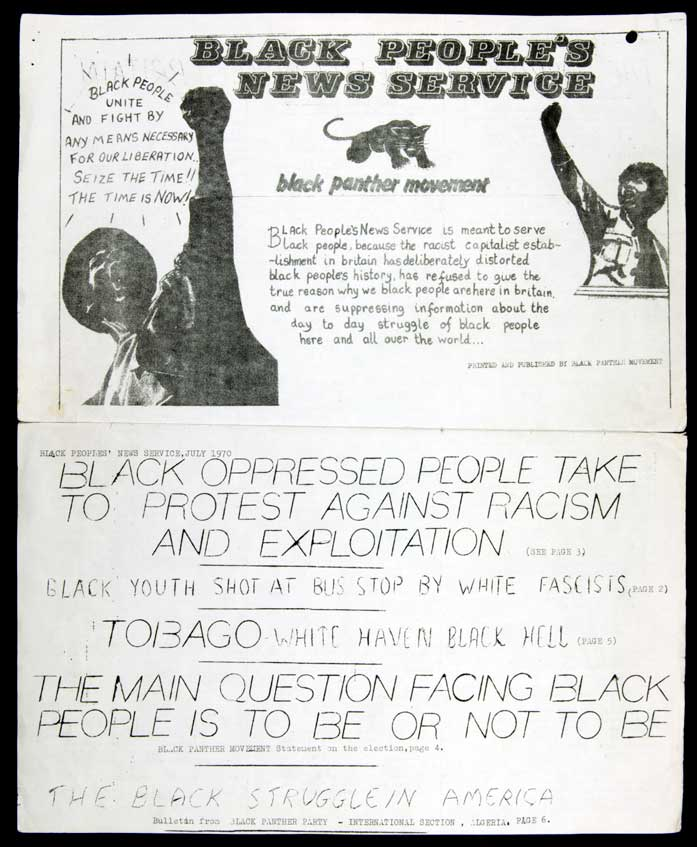
An issue of the Black Panther Party newspaper from July 1970.

By January 1967, the BPP opened its first official headquarters in an Oakland storefront and published the first issue of The Black Panther: Black Community News Service. The newspaper would be in continuous circulation, though varying in length, format, title, and frequency until the party dissolved. At its height, it sold one hundred thousand copies a week.

=== Late 1966 to early 1967 ===
Black Panther Party founders Bobby Seale and Huey P. Newton standing in the street, armed with a Colt .45 and a shotgun

==== Oakland patrols of police ====
The initial tactic of the party used contemporary open-carry gun laws to protect Party members when policing the police. This act was done to record incidents of police brutality by distantly following police cars around neighborhoods. When confronted by a police officer, Party members cited laws proving they had done nothing wrong and threatened to take to court any officer that violated their constitutional rights. Between the end of 1966 to the start of 1967, the Black Panther Party for Self-Defense's armed police patrols in Oakland black communities attracted a small handful of members. Numbers grew slightly starting in February 1967, when the party provided an armed escort at the San Francisco airport for Betty Shabazz, Malcolm X's widow and keynote speaker for a conference held in his honor.

The Black Panther Party's focus on militancy was often construed as open hostility, feeding a reputation of violence even though early efforts by the Panthers focused primarily on promoting social issues and the exercise of their legal right to carry arms. The Panthers employed a California law that permitted carrying a loaded rifle or shotgun as long as it was publicly displayed and pointed at no one. Generally this was done while monitoring and observing police behavior in their neighborhoods, with the Panthers arguing that this emphasis on active militancy and openly carrying their weapons was necessary to protect individuals from police violence. For example, chants like "The Revolution has come, it's time to pick up the gun. Off the pigs!", helped create the Panthers' reputation as a violent organization.

==== Rallies in Richmond, California ====
The black community of Richmond, California wanted protection against police brutality. With only three main streets for entering and exiting the neighborhood, it was easy for police to control, contain, and suppress the population. On April 1, 1967, a black unarmed twenty-two-year-old construction worker named Denzil Dowell was shot dead by police in North Richmond. Dowell's family contacted the Black Panther Party for assistance after county officials refused to investigate the case. The party held rallies in North Richmond that educated the community on armed self-defense and the Denzil Dowell incident. Police seldom interfered at these rallies because every Panther was armed and no laws were broken. The party's ideals resonated with several community members, who then brought their own guns to the next rallies.

==== Protest at the Statehouse ====
Awareness of the Black Panther Party for Self-Defense grew rapidly after their May 2, 1967, protest at the California State Capitol. On that day, the California State Assembly Committee on Criminal Procedure was scheduled to convene to discuss what was known as the "Mulford Act," which would make the public carrying of loaded firearms illegal. Newton, with Minister of Information Eldridge Cleaver, put together a plan to send a group of 26 armed Panthers led by Seale from Oakland to Sacramento to protest the bill. The group entered the assembly carrying their weapons, an incident which was widely publicized, and which prompted police to arrest Seale and five others. The group pleaded guilty to misdemeanor charges of disrupting a legislative session. At the time of the protest, the party had fewer than 100 members in total.

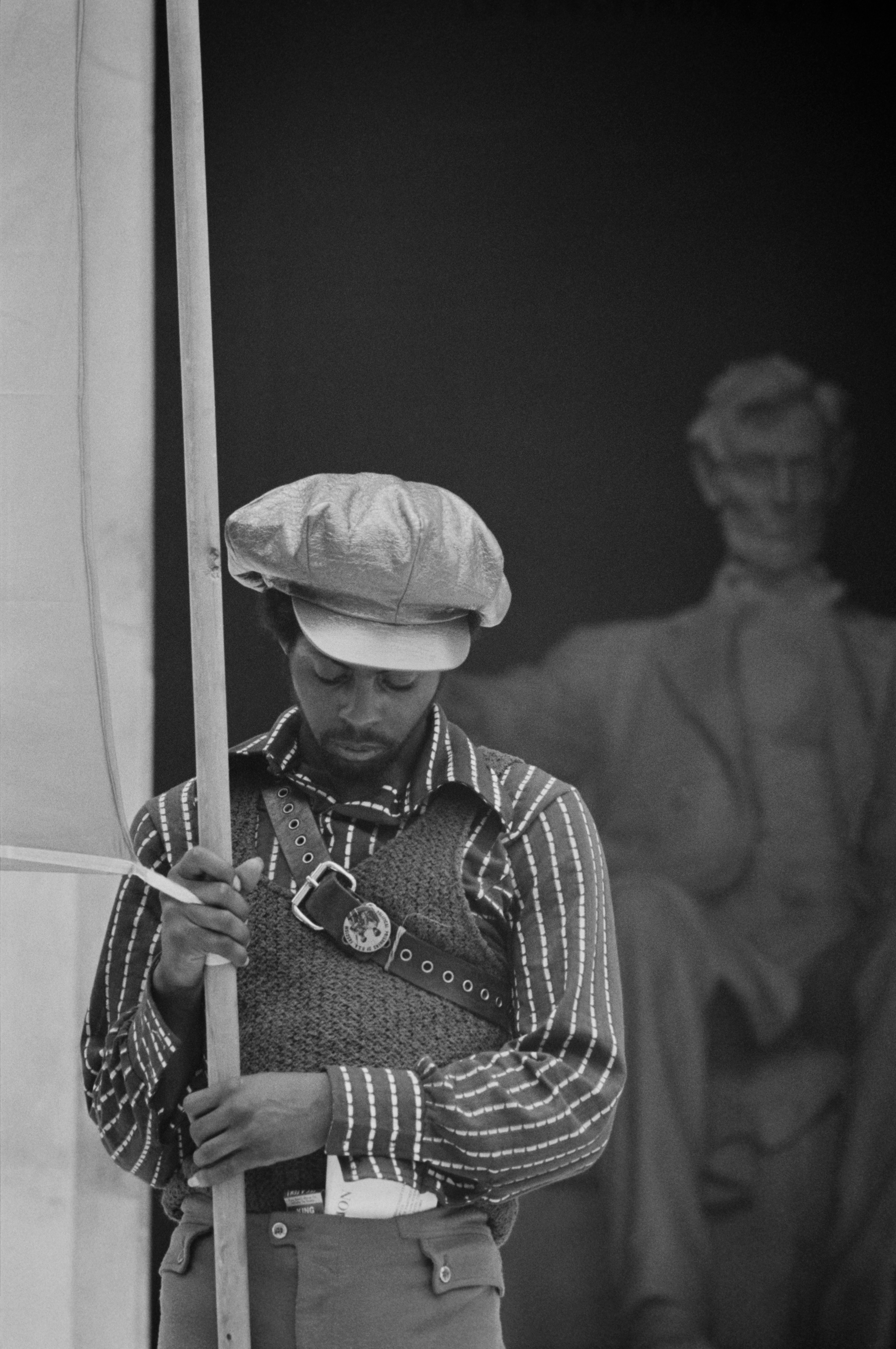
Black Panther convention, Lincoln Memorial, June 19, 1970

In May 1967, the Panthers invaded the State Assembly Chamber in Sacramento, guns in hand, in what appears to have been a publicity stunt. Still, they scared a lot of important people that day. At the time, the Panthers had almost no following. Now, (a year later) however, their leaders speak on invitation almost anywhere radicals gather, and many whites wear "Honkeys for Huey" buttons, supporting the fight to free Newton, who has been in jail since last Oct. 28 (1967) on the charge that he killed a policeman ...

In 1967, the Mulford Act was passed by the California legislature and signed by governor Ronald Reagan. The bill was crafted in response to members of the Black Panther Party who were copwatching. The bill repealed a law that allowed the public carrying of loaded firearms.

==== Ten-point program ====
The Black Panther Party first publicized its original "What We Want Now!" Ten-Point program on May 15, 1967, following the Sacramento action, in the second issue of The Black Panther newspaper.

1. We want freedom. We want power to determine the destiny of our Black Community.
2. We want full employment for our people.
3. We want an end to the robbery by the Capitalists of our Black Community.
4. We want decent housing, fit for shelter of human beings.
5. We want education for our people that exposes the true nature of this decadent American society. We want education that teaches us our true history and our role in present-day society.
6. We want all Black men to be exempt from military service.
7. We want an immediate end to POLICE BRUTALITY and MURDER of Black people.
8. We want freedom for all Black men held in federal, state, county and city prisons and jails.
9. We want all Black people when brought to trial to be tried in court by a jury of their peer group or people from their Black Communities, as defined by the Constitution of the United States.
10. We want land, bread, housing, education, clothing, justice and peace.

=== Late 1967 to early 1968 ===
==== COINTELPRO ====
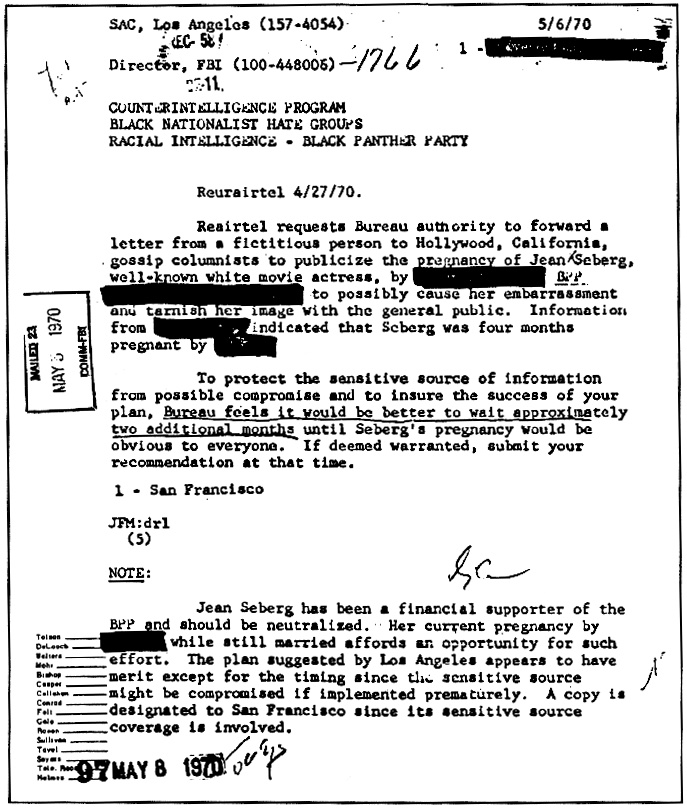
COINTELPRO document outlining the FBI's plans to 'neutralize' Jean Seberg for her support for the Black Panther Party, by attempting to publicly "cause her embarrassment" and "tarnish her image".

In August 1967, the Federal Bureau of Investigation (FBI) instructed its program "COINTELPRO" to "neutralize ... black nationalist hate groups" and other dissident groups. In September 1968, FBI director J. Edgar Hoover described the Black Panthers as "the greatest threat to the internal security of the country". By 1969, the Black Panthers and their allies had become primary COINTELPRO targets, singled out in 233 of the 295 authorized "Black Nationalist" COINTELPRO actions. The goals of the program were to prevent the unification of militant black nationalist groups and to weaken their leadership, as well as to discredit them to reduce their support and growth. The initial targets included the Southern Christian Leadership Conference, the Student Nonviolent Coordinating Committee, the Revolutionary Action Movement and the Nation of Islam, as well as leaders including the Rev. Martin Luther King Jr., Stokely Carmichael, H. Rap Brown, Maxwell Stanford and Elijah Muhammad. As assistant FBI director William Sullivan later testified in front of the Church Committee, the bureau "did not differentiate" between Soviet spies and suspected Communists in black nationalist movements when deploying surveillance and neutralization tactics.

COINTELPRO attempted to create rivalries between black nationalist factions and to exploit existing ones. One such attempt was to "intensify the degree of animosity" between the Black Panthers and the Blackstone Rangers, a Chicago street gang. The FBI sent an anonymous letter to the Rangers' gang leader claiming that the Panthers were threatening his life, a letter whose intent was to provoke "preemptive" violence against Panther leadership. In Southern California, the FBI made similar efforts to exacerbate a "gang war" between the Black Panther Party and a black nationalist group called the US Organization, allegedly sending a provocative letter to the US Organization to increase existing antagonism.

COINTELPRO also aimed to dismantle the Black Panther Party by targeting their social/community programs, including its Free Breakfast for Children program, whose success had served to "shed light on the government's failure to address child poverty and hunger—pointing to the limits of the nation's War on Poverty". According to Bloom & Martin, the FBI denounced the party's efforts as a means of indoctrination because the party taught and provided for children more effectively than the government. "Police and Federal Agents regularly harassed and intimidated program participants, supporters, and Party workers and sought to scare away donors and organizations that housed the programs like churches and community centers".

Black Panther Party members were involved in many fatal firefights with police. Newton declared:

Malcolm, implacable to the ultimate degree, held out to the Black masses ... liberation from the chains of the oppressor and the treacherous embrace of the endorsed [Black] spokesmen. Only with the gun were the black masses denied this victory. But they learned from Malcolm that with the gun, they can recapture their dreams and bring them into reality.

==== Huey Newton charged with murdering John Frey ====
On October 28, 1967, Oakland police officer John Frey was shot to death in an altercation with Huey P. Newton during a traffic stop in which Newton and backup officer Herbert Heanes also sustained gunshot wounds. Newton was convicted of voluntary manslaughter at trial, but the conviction was later overturned. In his book Shadow of the Panther, writer Hugh Pearson alleges that Newton was intoxicated in the hours before the incident, and claimed to have willfully killed John Frey.

==== Free Huey! campaign ====
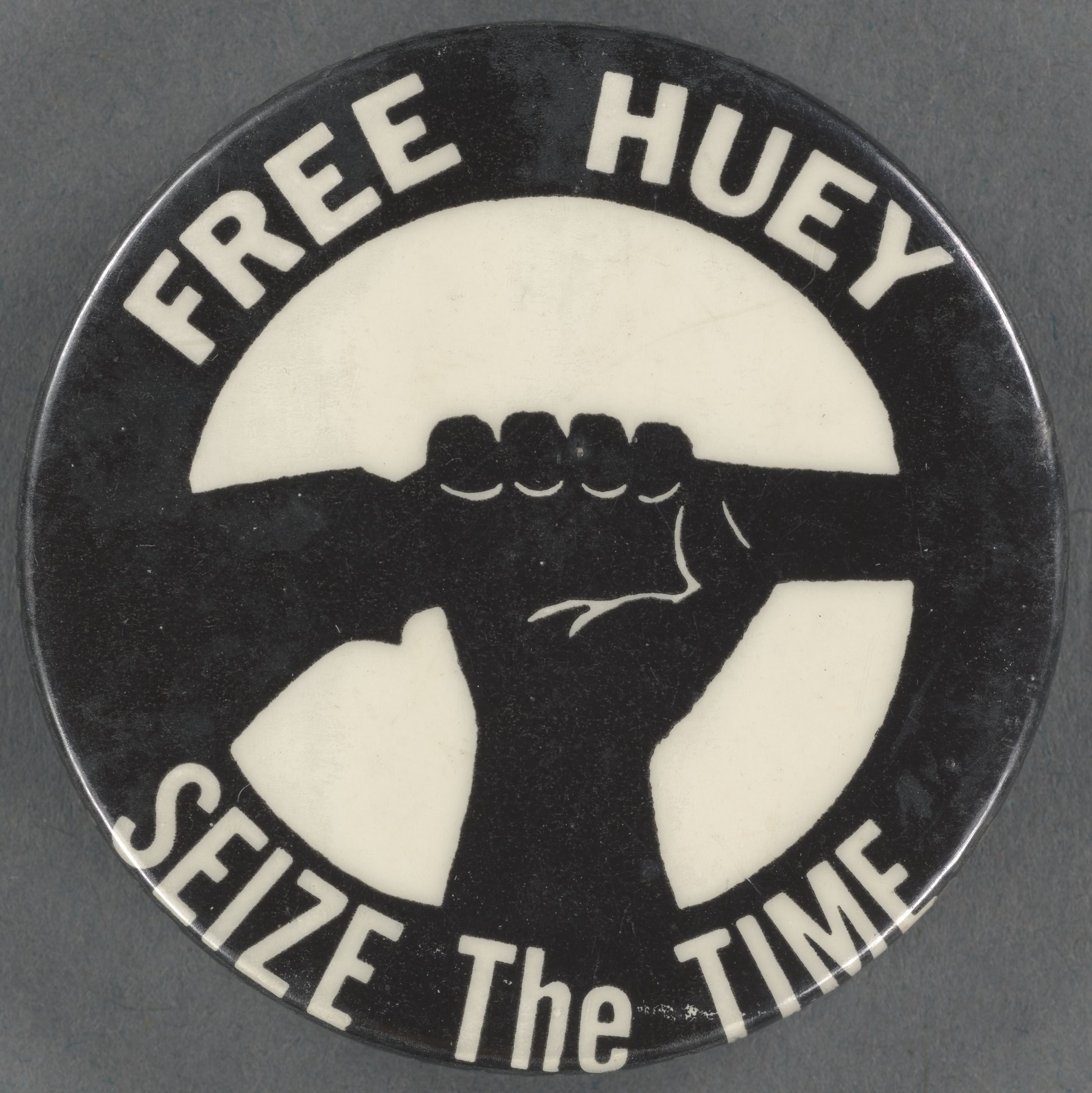
A button supporting the campaign to release Huey P. Newton, founder of the Black Panther Party.

At the time, Newton claimed that he had been falsely accused, leading to the party's "Free Huey!" campaign. The police killing gained the party even wider recognition by the radical American left and it stimulated the growth of the party nationwide. Newton was released after three years, when his conviction was reversed on appeal.

As Newton awaited trial, the "Free Huey" campaign developed alliances with numerous students and anti-war activists, "advancing an anti-imperialist political ideology that linked the oppression of antiwar protestors to the oppression of blacks and Vietnamese". The "Free Huey" campaign attracted black power organizations, New Left groups, and other activist groups such as the Progressive Labor Party, Bob Avakian of the Community for New Politics, and the Red Guard. For example, the Black Panther Party collaborated with the Peace and Freedom Party, which sought to promote a strong antiwar and antiracist politics in opposition to the establishment Democratic Party. The Black Panther Party provided needed legitimacy to the Peace and Freedom Party's racial politics and in return received invaluable support for the "Free Huey" campaign.

==== Founding of the L. A. Chapter ====
In 1968 the southern California chapter was founded by Alprentice "Bunchy" Carter in Los Angeles. Carter was the leader of the Slauson Street gang, and many of the L.A. chapter's early recruits were Slausons.

==== Killing of Bobby Hutton ====
Bobby James Hutton was born April 21, 1950, in Jefferson County, Arkansas. At the age of three, he and his family moved to Oakland, California after being harassed by racist vigilante groups associated with the Ku Klux Klan. In December 1966, he became the first treasurer and recruit of the Black Panther Party at the age of just 16 years old.

On April 6, 1968, two days after the assassination of Dr. Martin Luther King, Jr., and with riots raging across cities in the United States, the 17-year-old Hutton was traveling with Eldridge Cleaver and other BPP members in a car. The group confronted Oakland Police officers, then fled to an apartment building where they engaged in a 90-minute gun battle with the police. The standoff ended with Cleaver wounded and Hutton voluntarily surrendering. According to Cleaver, although Hutton had stripped down to his underwear and had his hands raised in the air to prove that he was unarmed, Oakland Police shot Hutton more than 12 times, killing him. Two police officers were also shot. He became the first member of the party to be killed by police.

Although at the time the BPP claimed that the police had ambushed them, several party members later admitted that Cleaver had led the Panther group on a deliberate ambush of the police officers, provoking the shoot-out. Seven other Panthers, including Chief of Staff David Hilliard, were also arrested. Hutton's death became a rallying issue for Panther supporters.

=== Late 1968 ===
==== Chronology ====
- Early Spring 1968: Eldridge Cleaver's Soul on Ice published.
- April 6, 1968: Death of Bobby James Hutton, killed in a gunfight with Oakland police.
- April 17, 1968: Funeral for Bobby James Hutton in Berkeley, followed by a rally at the Alameda County Courthouse.
- April to mid-June 1968: Cleaver in jail.
- Mid-July 1968: Huey Newton's murder trial commences. Panthers hold daily "Free Huey" rallies outside the courthouse.
- August 5, 1968: Three Panthers killed in a gun battle with police at a Los Angeles gas station.
- Early September 1968: Newton convicted of manslaughter.
- Late September 1968: Days before he is due to return to prison to serve out a rape conviction, Cleaver flees to Cuba and later Algeria.
- October 5, 1968: A Panther is killed in a gunfight with police in Los Angeles.
- November 1968: The BPP finds numerous supporters, establishing relationships with the Peace and Freedom Party and SNCC.
- November 6, 1968: Lauren Watson, head of the Denver chapter, is arrested by Denver Police for fleeing a police officer and resisting arrest. His trial will be filmed and televised in 1970 as "Trial: The City and County of Denver vs. Lauren R. Watson."
- November 20, 1968: William Lee Brent and two accomplices in a van marked "Black Panther Black Community News Service" allegedly rob a gas station in San Francisco's Bayview district of $80, resulting in a shootout with police.

In 1968, the group shortened its name to the Black Panther Party and sought to focus directly on political action. Members were encouraged to carry guns and to defend themselves against violence. An influx of college students joined the group, which had consisted chiefly of "brothers off the block". This created some tension in the group. Some members were more interested in supporting the Panthers' social programs, while others wanted to maintain their "street mentality".

By 1968, the party had expanded into many U.S. cities, including Atlanta, Baltimore, Boston, Chicago, Cleveland, Dallas, Denver, Detroit, Kansas City, Los Angeles, Newark, New Orleans, New York City, Omaha, Philadelphia, Pittsburgh, San Diego, San Francisco, Seattle, Toledo, and Washington, D.C. Peak membership was near 5,000 by 1969, and their newspaper, under the editorial leadership of Eldridge Cleaver, had a circulation of 250,000. The group created a Ten-Point Program, a document that called for "Land, Bread, Housing, Education, Clothing, Justice and Peace", as well as exemption from conscription for black men, among other demands. With the Ten-Point program, "What We Want, What We Believe," the Black Panther Party expressed its economic and political grievances.

Curtis Austin states that by late 1968, Black Panther ideology had evolved from black nationalism to become more a "revolutionary internationalist movement":

[The Party] dropped its wholesale attacks against whites and began to emphasize more of a class analysis of society. Its emphasis on Marxist–Leninist doctrine and its repeated espousal of Maoist statements signaled the group's transition from a revolutionary nationalist to a revolutionary internationalist movement. Every Party member had to study Mao Tse-tung's "Little Red Book" to advance his or her knowledge of peoples' struggle and the revolutionary process.

Panther slogans and iconography spread. At the 1968 Summer Olympics, Tommie Smith and John Carlos, two American track and field medalists, gave the black power salute during the American national anthem. The International Olympic Committee banned them from all future Olympic Games. Film star Jane Fonda publicly supported Huey Newton and the Black Panthers during the early 1970s. She ended up informally adopting Mary Luana Williams, the daughter of two BPP members. Fonda and other Hollywood celebrities became involved in the Panthers' leftist programs. The Panthers attracted a wide variety of left-wing revolutionaries and political activists, including writer Jean Genet, former Ramparts magazine editor David Horowitz (who later became a harsh critic of what he described as Panther criminality), and left-wing lawyer Charles R. Garry, who acted as counsel in the Panthers' many legal battles.

The BPP adopted a "Serve the People" program, which at first involved a free breakfast program for children. By the end of 1968, the BPP had established 38 chapters and branches, claiming more than 5,000 members. Eldridge and Kathleen Cleaver left the country days before Cleaver was to turn himself in to serve the remainder of a thirteen-year sentence for a 1958 rape conviction. They settled in Algeria.

==== Survival programs ====
No kid should be running around hungry in school.

— Bobby Seale

Inspired by Mao Zedong's advice to revolutionaries in The Little Red Book, Newton called on the Panthers to "serve the people" and to make "survival programs" a priority within its branches. The most famous of their programs was the Free Breakfast for Children Program, initially run out of an Oakland church.

The Free Breakfast For Children program was especially significant because it served as a space for educating youth about the current condition of the Black community, and the actions that the party was taking to address that condition. "While the children ate their meal[s], members [of the party] taught them liberation lessons consisting of Party messages and Black history." Through this program, the party was able to influence young minds, and strengthen their ties to communities as well as gain widespread support for their ideologies. The breakfast program became so popular that the Panthers Party claimed to have fed twenty thousand children in the 1968–69 school year.

The Black Panther Party's free breakfast program is "the greatest threat to efforts by authorities to neutralize the BPP and destroy what it stands for."

— FBI director J. Edgar Hoover

Other survival programs were free services such as clothing distribution, classes on politics and economics, free medical clinics, lessons on self-defense and first aid, transportation to upstate prisons for family members of inmates, an emergency-response ambulance program, drug and alcohol rehabilitation, and testing for sickle-cell disease. The free medical clinics were very significant because they modeled an idea of how the world might work with free medical care, eventually being established in 13 places across the country. These clinics were involved in community-based health care that had roots connected to the Civil Rights Movement, which made it possible to establish the Medical Committee for Human Rights.

==== Political activities ====
In 1968, BPP Minister of Information Eldridge Cleaver ran for presidential office on the Peace and Freedom Party ticket. They were a big influence on the White Panther Party, tied to the Detroit/Ann Arbor band MC5 and their manager John Sinclair (author of the book Guitar Army), which also promulgated a ten-point program.

=== 1969 ===
==== Chronology ====
- Early 1969: In late 1968 and January 1969, the BPP began to purge members due to fears about law enforcement infiltration and various petty disagreements.
- January 14, 1969: The Los Angeles chapter was involved in a shootout with members of the black nationalist US Organization, and two Panthers are killed.
- January 1969: The Oakland BPP begins the first free breakfast program for children.
- March 1969: There is a second purge of BPP members.
- April 1969: Members of the New York chapter, known as the Panther 21, are indicted and jailed for a bombing conspiracy. All would eventually be acquitted.
- May 1969: Two more southern California Panthers are killed in violent disputes with US Organization members.
- May 1969: Members of the New Haven chapter torture and murder Alex Rackley, who they suspected of being an informant.
- July 1969 the BPP organized the United Front Against Fascism conference in Oakland, which was attended by around 5,000 people representing a number of groups.
- July 17, 1969: Two policemen are shot, and a Panther is killed in a gun battle in Chicago.
- Late July 1969: The BPP ideology undergoes a shift, with a turn toward self-discipline and anti-racism.
- August 1969: Bobby Seale is indicted and imprisoned in relation to the Rackley murder.
- October 18, 1969: A Panther is killed in a gunfight with police outside a Los Angeles restaurant.
- Mid-to-late 1969: COINTELPRO activity increases.
- November 13, 1969: A Panther is killed in a gunfight with police in Chicago.
- December 4, 1969: Fred Hampton and Mark Clark are killed by law enforcement in Chicago.
- Late 1969: David Hilliard, as BPP head, advocates violent revolution. Panther membership is down significantly from the late 1968 peak.

==== Shoot-out with the US Organization ====
Violent conflict between the Panther chapter in LA and the US Organization, a black nationalist group, resulted in shootings and beatings and led to the murders of at least four Black Panther Party members. On January 17, 1969, Los Angeles Panther captain Bunchy Carter and deputy minister John Huggins were killed in Campbell Hall on the UCLA campus, in a gun battle with members of the US Organization. Another shootout between the two groups on March 17 led to further injuries. Two more Panthers died.

==== Black Panther Party Education Programs and Liberation Schools ====
Paramount to their beliefs regarding the need for individual agency to catalyze community change, the Black Panther Party (BPP) strongly supported the education of the masses. As part of their Ten-Point Program which set forth the ideals and goals of the party, they demanded an equitable education for all black people. Study and reading was important for all would-be candidates of the party, which included studying the Ten-Point Program, reading the Black Panther newspaper, and attending a series of political education classes as well as weapons training. A 1968 "Panther Party Book List" was circulated in the party newspaper, recommending Panthers read the following titles (the first five particularly emphasized):

- The Autobiography of Malcolm X by Malcolm X and Alex Haley
- The Wretched of the Earth by Frantz Fanon
- I Speak of Freedom by Kwame Nkrumah
- The Lost Cities of Africa by Basil Davidson
- The Nat Turner Slave Revolt by Herbert Aptheker
- American Negro Slave Revolts by Herbert Aptheker
- A Documentary History of the Negro People of the United States by Herbert Aptheker
- Before the Mayflower by Lerone Bennett Jr.
- American Negro Poetry by Arna W. Bontemps
- Story of the Negro by Arna W. Bontemps
- Black Moses: The Story of Garvey and the UNIA by E.D. Cronin
- Black Reconstruction in America by W.E.B. Du Bois
- The Souls of Black Folk by W.E.B. Du Bois
- The World and Africa by W.E.B. Du Bois
- Black Mother: The Years of the African Slave Trade by Basil Davidson
- Studies in a Dying Colonialism by Frantz Fanon
- From Slavery to Freedom by John Hope Franklin
- Black Bourgeoisie by E.F. Frazier
- The Other America by Michael Harrington
- Garvey & Garveyism by Marcus Garvey
- The Philosophy and Opinions of Marcus Garvey by Marcus Garvey
- The Myth of the Negro Past by Melville J. Herskovits
- A History of Negro Revolt by C.L.R. James
- MUNTU: The New African Culture by Janheinz Jahn
- Blues People by LeRoi Jones (later known as Amiri Baraka)
- Black Muslims in America by C.E. Lincoln
- Malcolm X Speaks by Malcolm X
- The Colonizer and the Colonized by Albert Memmi
- Ghana by Kwame Nkrumah
- We Charge Genocide by William L. Patterson
- Africa's Gift to America, World's Great Men of Color: 3,000 B.C. to 1946 A.D. by J.A. Rogers
- The Negro in Our History by Charles H. Wesley & Carter G. Woodson
- The Strange Career of Jim Crow by C. Vann Woodward
- Native Son by Richard Wright

Number 5 of the "What We Want Now!" section of the Ten-Point Program reads: "We want education for our people that exposes the true nature of this decadent American society. We want education that teaches us our true history and our role in present-day society." To ensure that this occurred, the Black Panther Party took the education of their youth into their own hands by first establishing after-school programs and then opening up Liberation Schools in a variety of locations throughout the country which focused their curriculum on Black history, writing skills, and political science.

=== Intercommunal Youth Institute ===
The first Liberation School was opened by the Richmond Black Panthers in July 1969 with brunch served and snacks provided to students. Another school was opened in Mt. Vernon New York on July 17 of the subsequent year. These schools were informal in nature and more closely resembled after-school or summer programs. While these campuses were the first to open, the first full-time and longest-running Liberation School was opened in January 1971 in Oakland in response to the inequitable conditions in the Oakland Unified School District which was ranked one of the lowest-scoring districts in California. Named the Intercommunal Youth Institute (IYI), this school, under the directorship of Brenda Bay, and later Ericka Huggins, enrolled twenty-eight students in its first year, with the majority being the children of Black Panther parents. This number grew to fifty by the 1973–1974 school year. To provide full support for Black Panther parents whose time was spent organizing, some of the students and faculty members lived together year around. The school itself was dissimilar to traditional schools in a variety of ways including the fact that students were separated by academic performance rather than age, and students were often provided one-on-one support as the faculty to student ratio was 1:10.

The Panther's goal in opening Liberation Schools, and specifically the Intercommunal Youth Institute, was to provide students with an education that was not being provided in the "white" schools, as the public schools in the district employed a Eurocentric assimilationist curriculum with little to no attention to black history and culture. While students were provided with traditional courses such as English, Math, and Science, they were also exposed to activities focused on class structure and the prevalence of institutional racism. The overall goal of the school was to instill a sense of revolutionary consciousness in the students. With a strong belief in experiential learning, students had the opportunity to participate in community service projects as well as practice their writing skills by drafting letters to political prisoners associated with the Black Panther Party. Huggins is noted as saying, "I think that the school's principles came from the socialist principles we tried to live in the Black Panther Party. One of them being critical thinking—that children should learn not what to think but how to think ... the school was an expression of the collective wisdom of the people who envisioned it. And it was ... a living thing [that] changed every year. Joan Kelley oversaw funding for the Intercommunal Youth Institute which was provided through a combination of Black Panther fundraising and community support.

==== Oakland Community School ====
In 1974, due to increased interest in enrolling in the school, school officials decided to move to a larger facility and subsequently changed the school's name to Oakland Community School. During this year, the school graduated its first class. Although the student population continued to grow ranging between 50 and 150 between 1974 and 1977, the original core values of individualized instruction remained. In September 1977, the school received a special award from Governor Edmund Brown Jr. and the California Legislature for "having set the standard for the highest level of elementary education in the state.

The school eventually closed in 1982 due to governmental pressure on party leadership, which caused insufficient membership and funds to continue running the school.

==== Killing of Fred Hampton and Mark Clark ====
In Chicago, on December 4, 1969, two Panthers were killed when the Chicago Police raided the home of Panther leader Fred Hampton. The raid had been orchestrated by the police in conjunction with the FBI. Hampton was shot and killed, as was Panther guard Mark Clark. A federal investigation reported that only one shot was fired by the Panthers, and police fired at least 80 shots. The only shot fired by the Panthers was from Mark Clark, who appeared to fire a single round determined to be the result of a reflexive death convulsion after he was immediately struck in the chest by shots from the police at the start of the raid.

Hampton was sleeping next to his pregnant fiancée and was subsequently shot twice in the head at point-blank range while unconscious. Coroner reports show that Hampton was drugged with a powerful barbiturate that night and would have been unable to have been awoken by the sounds of the police raid. His body was then dragged into the hallway. He was 21 years old and unarmed at the time of his death. Seven other Panthers sleeping at the house at the time of the raid were then beaten and seriously wounded, then arrested under charges of aggravated assault and attempted murder of the officers involved in the raid. These charges would later be dropped.

Cook County state's attorney Edward Hanrahan announced to the media later that the Panthers were first to shoot in the interaction and that they showed a "refusal to cease firing... when urged to do so several times." New York Times reporting would later demonstrate that this was not in fact the case and found a great deal of fake evidence being used by Chicago Police to assert their claims.

Former FBI agent Wesley Swearingen asserts that the Bureau was guilty of a "plot to murder" the Panthers. Hampton had been slipped the barbiturates which had left him unconscious by William O'Neal, who had been working as an FBI informant. Hanrahan, his assistant, and eight Chicago police officers were indicted by a federal grand jury over the raid, but the charges were later dismissed. In 1979 civil action, Hampton's family won $1.85 million from the city of Chicago in a wrongful death settlement.

==== Torture-murder of Alex Rackley ====
In May 1969, three members of the New Haven chapter tortured and murdered Alex Rackley, a 19-year-old member of the New York chapter, because they suspected him of being a police informant. Three party officers—Warren Kimbro, George Sams, Jr., and Lonnie McLucas—later admitted taking part. Sams, who gave the order to shoot Rackley at the murder scene, turned state's evidence and testified that he had received orders personally from Bobby Seale to carry out the execution. Party supporters responded that Sams was himself the informant and an agent provocateur employed by the FBI. The case resulted in the New Haven Black Panther trials of 1970. Kimbro, Sams and McLucas were convicted of the murder, but the trials of Seale and Ericka Huggins ended with a hung jury, and the prosecution chose not to seek another trial.

==== International ties ====
Activists from many countries around the globe supported the Panthers and their cause. In Western European countries such as Norway and Finland, for example, social democratic and democratic socialist activists organized a tour for Bobby Seale and Masai Hewitt in 1969. At each destination along the tour, the Panthers talked about their goals and the "Free Huey!" campaign. Seale and Hewitt made a stop in Germany as well, gaining support for the "Free Huey!" campaign.

=== 1970 ===
==== Chronology ====
- January 1970: Leonard Bernstein holds a fundraiser for the BPP, which was notoriously mocked by Tom Wolfe in Radical Chic & Mau-Mauing the Flak Catchers.
- Spring 1970: The Oakland BPP engages in another ambush of police officers with guns and fragmentation bombs. Two officers are wounded.
- May 1970: Huey Newton's conviction is overturned, but he remains incarcerated.
- July 1970: Newton tells The New York Times that "we've never advocated violence".
- August 1970: Newton is released from prison.

==== International travels ====
In 1970, a group of Panthers including Eldridge Cleaver and Elaine Brown traveled to Asia and they were welcomed as guests of the governments of China, North Vietnam, and North Korea. The group's first stop was in North Korea, where the Panthers met with local officials to discuss ways in which they could help each other fight against American imperialism. Cleaver traveled to Pyongyang twice in 1969 and 1970 and following these trips he made an effort to publicize the writings and works of North Korean leader Kim Il Sung in the United States. After leaving North Korea, the group traveled to North Vietnam with the same agenda in mind: finding ways to put an end to American imperialism. Eldridge Cleaver was invited to speak to Black GIs by the North Vietnamese government. He encouraged them to join the Black Liberation Struggle by arguing that the United States government was only using them for its own purposes. Instead of risking their lives on the battlefield for a country that continued to oppress them, Cleaver believed that the black GIs should risk their lives in support of their own liberation. After leaving Vietnam, Cleaver met with the Chinese ambassador to Algeria to express their mutual animosity towards the American government.

When Algeria held its first Pan-African Cultural Festival, they invited many important figures from the United States. Among the important figures invited to the festival were Bobby Seale and Cleaver. The cultural festival allowed Black Panthers to network with representatives of various international anti-imperialist movements. This was a significant time, which led to the formation of the International Section of the party. It is at this festival that Cleaver met with the ambassador of North Korea, who later invited him to an International Conference of Revolutionary Journalists in Pyongyang. Eldridge also met with Yasser Arafat and gave a speech supporting the Palestinians and their goal of achieving liberation.

In fall 1971, a larger group of Panthers visited China.

=== 1971–1974 ===
Newton focused the BPP on the party's Oakland school and various other social service programs. In early 1971, the BPP founded the "Intercommunal Youth Institute" in January 1971, with the intent of demonstrating how black youth ought to be educated. Ericka Huggins was the director of the school and Regina Davis was an administrator. The school was unique in that it did not have grade levels but instead had different skill levels so an 11-year-old could be in second-level English and fifth-level science. Elaine Brown taught reading and writing to a group of 10- to 11-year-olds deemed "uneducable" by the system. The school children were given free busing; breakfast, lunch, and dinner; books and school supplies; children were taken to have medical checkups; many children were given free clothes.

==== Split ====
Significant disagreements among the party's leaders over how to confront ideological differences led to a split within the party. Some Panther leaders, such as Huey P. Newton and David Hilliard, favored a focus on community service coupled with self-defense; others, such as Eldridge Cleaver, embraced a more confrontational strategy. For some of the party's supporters, the separations among political action, criminal activity, social services, access to power, and grass-roots identity became confusing and contradictory as the Panthers' political momentum was bogged down in the criminal justice system. These (and other) disagreements led to a split. In January 1971, Newton expelled Geronimo Pratt who, since 1970, had been in jail facing a pending murder charge. Newton also expelled two of the New York 21 and his own secretary, Connie Matthews, who fled the country.

In February 1971, Cleaver deepened the schism in the party when he publicly criticized the party for adopting a "reformist" rather than "revolutionary" agenda and called for Hilliard's removal. Cleaver was expelled from the Central Committee but went on to lead a splinter group, the Black Liberation Army, which had previously existed as an underground paramilitary wing of the party. The split turned violent, as the Newton and Cleaver factions carried out retaliatory assassinations of each other's members, resulting in the deaths of four people. From mid-to-late 1971, hundreds of members throughout the country quit the Black Panther Party.

In May 1971, Bobby Seale was acquitted of ordering the Rackley murder, and returned to Oakland.

==== Delegation to China ====
In late September 1971, Huey P. Newton led a delegation to China and stayed for 10 days. At every airport in China, Huey was greeted by thousands of people waving copies of the Little Red Book and displaying signs that said, "We support the Black Panther Party, down with US imperialism" or, "We support the American people but the Nixon imperialist regime must be overthrown." During the trip, the Chinese delegate arranged for him to meet and have dinner with a DPRK ambassador, a Tanzanian ambassador, and delegations from both North Vietnam and the Provisional Revolutionary Government of South Vietnam. Huey was under the impression he was going to meet Mao Zedong, but instead had two meetings with the first Premier of the People's Republic of China Zhou Enlai. One of these meetings also included Mao Zedong's wife Jiang Qing. Huey described China as "a free and liberated territory with a socialist government."

==== Newton solidifies control and centralizes power in Oakland ====
In early 1972, the party began closing down dozens of chapters and branches all over the country and bringing members and operations to Oakland. The political arm of the Southern California chapter was shut down and its members moved to Oakland, although the underground military arm remained for a time. The underground remnants of the LA chapter, which had emerged from the Slausons street gang, eventually re-emerged as the Crips, a street gang who at first advocated social reform before devolving into racketeering. Minister of Education Ray "Masai" Hewitt created the Buddha Samurai, the party's underground security cadre in Oakland. Newton expelled Hewitt from the party later in 1972, but the security cadre remained in operation under the leadership of Flores Forbes. One of the cadre's main functions was to extort and rob drug dealers and after-hours clubs.

The party developed a five-year plan to take over the city of Oakland politically and focused nearly all of its resources on winning political power in the Oakland city government. Bobby Seale ran for mayor, Elaine Brown ran for city council, and other Panthers ran for minor offices. Neither Seale nor Brown were elected, and many Party members resigned after the losses, although a few Panthers won seats on local government commissions. Following the electoral defeat, Newton embarked on a major purge of the party in early 1974, expelling Bobby and John Seale, David and June Hilliard, Robert Bay, and numerous other top party leaders. Dozens of other Panthers loyal to Seale resigned or deserted.

==== Newton indicted for violent crimes ====
In 1974, Huey Newton and eight other Panthers were arrested and charged with assault on police officers. In August 1974, Newton went into exile in Cuba to avoid prosecution for the murder of Kathleen Smith, an eighteen-year-old prostitute. Newton was also indicted for pistol-whipping his tailor, Preston Callins. Although Newton confided to friends that Kathleen Smith was his "first nonpolitical murder", he was ultimately acquitted, after one witness's testimony was impeached by her admission that she had been smoking marijuana on the night of the murder, and another prostitute witness recanted her testimony. Newton was also acquitted of assaulting Preston Callins after Callins refused to press charges.

=== 1974–1977 ===
==== The Panthers under Elaine Brown ====
In 1974, as Huey Newton prepared to go into exile in Cuba, he appointed Elaine Brown as the first chairwoman of the party. Under Brown's leadership, the party became involved in organizing for more radical electoral campaigns, including Brown's 1975 unsuccessful run for Oakland City Council. The party supported Lionel Wilson in his successful election as the first black mayor of Oakland, in exchange for Wilson's assistance in having criminal charges dropped against party member Flores Forbes, leader of the Buddha Samurai cadre.

In addition to changing the party's direction towards more involvement in the electoral arena, Brown also increased the influence of women Panthers by placing them in more visible roles within the previously male-dominated organization.

==== Death of Betty van Patter ====
Panther leader Elaine Brown hired Betty Van Patter in 1974 as a bookkeeper. Van Patter had previously served as a bookkeeper for Ramparts magazine and was introduced to the Panther leadership by David Horowitz, who had been the editor of Ramparts and a major fundraiser and board member for the Panther school. Later that year, after a dispute with Brown over financial irregularities, Van Patter went missing on December 13, 1974. Some weeks later, her severely beaten corpse was found on a San Francisco Bay beach.

There was insufficient evidence for police to charge anyone with van Patter's murder. According to the author Frank Browning, the Black Panther Party leadership was "almost universally believed to be responsible". Huey Newton later allegedly confessed to a friend that he had ordered Van Patter's murder, and that Van Patter had been tortured and raped before being killed.

FBI files investigating Van Patter were destroyed in 2009 for reasons the FBI has declined to provide.

=== 1977–1982 ===
==== Return of Huey Newton and the demise of the party ====
In 1977, Newton returned from exile in Cuba, and received complaints from male members about the excessive power of women in the organization, who now outnumbered men. According to Elaine Brown, Newton authorized the physical punishment of school administrator Regina Davis for scolding a male coworker. Davis was hospitalized with a broken jaw. Brown said, "The beating of Regina would be taken as a clear signal that the words 'Panther' and 'comrade' had taken a gender-on-gender connotation, denoting an inferiority in the female half of us." Brown resigned from the party and fled to LA.

Although many scholars and activists date the party's downfall to the period before Brown's leadership, a shrinking cadre of Panthers struggled through the 1970s. By 1980 Panther membership had dwindled to 27, and the Panther-sponsored Oakland Community School closed in 1982 amid a scandal over Newton embezzling funds for his drug addiction, which marked the formal end of the Black Panther Party.

==== Panthers attempt to assassinate a witness against Newton ====
In October 1977, Flores Forbes, the party's assistant chief of staff, led a botched attempt to assassinate Crystal Gray, a key prosecution witness in Newton's upcoming trial, who had been present the day of Kathleen Smith's murder. When three Panthers attacked the wrong house by mistake, the occupant returned fire and killed one of the Panthers, Louis Johnson, while the other two assailants escaped. One of them, Flores Forbes, fled to Las Vegas, Nevada, with the help of Panther paramedic Nelson Malloy. Fearing that Malloy would discover the truth behind the botched assassination attempt, Newton allegedly ordered a "house cleaning", and Malloy was shot and buried alive in the desert. Although permanently paralyzed from the waist down, Malloy escaped and told police that fellow Panthers Rollin Reid and Allen Lewis were behind his attempted murder. Newton denied any involvement or knowledge and said the events "might have been the result of overzealous party members". Newton was ultimately acquitted of the murder of Kathleen Smith, after Crystal Gray's testimony was impeached by her admission that she had smoked marijuana on the night of the murder, and he was acquitted of assaulting Preston Callins after Callins refused to press charges.

== Women and womanism ==
From its beginnings, the Black Panther Party championed black masculinity and traditional gender roles. A notice in the first issue of The Black Panther newspaper proclaimed the all-male organization as "the cream of Black Manhood ... there for the protection and defense of our Black community". Scholars consider the party's stance of armed resistance highly masculine, with guns and violence proving manhood. In 1968, several articles urged female Panthers to "stand behind black men" and be supportive. The first woman to join the party was Joan Tarika Lewis, in 1967.

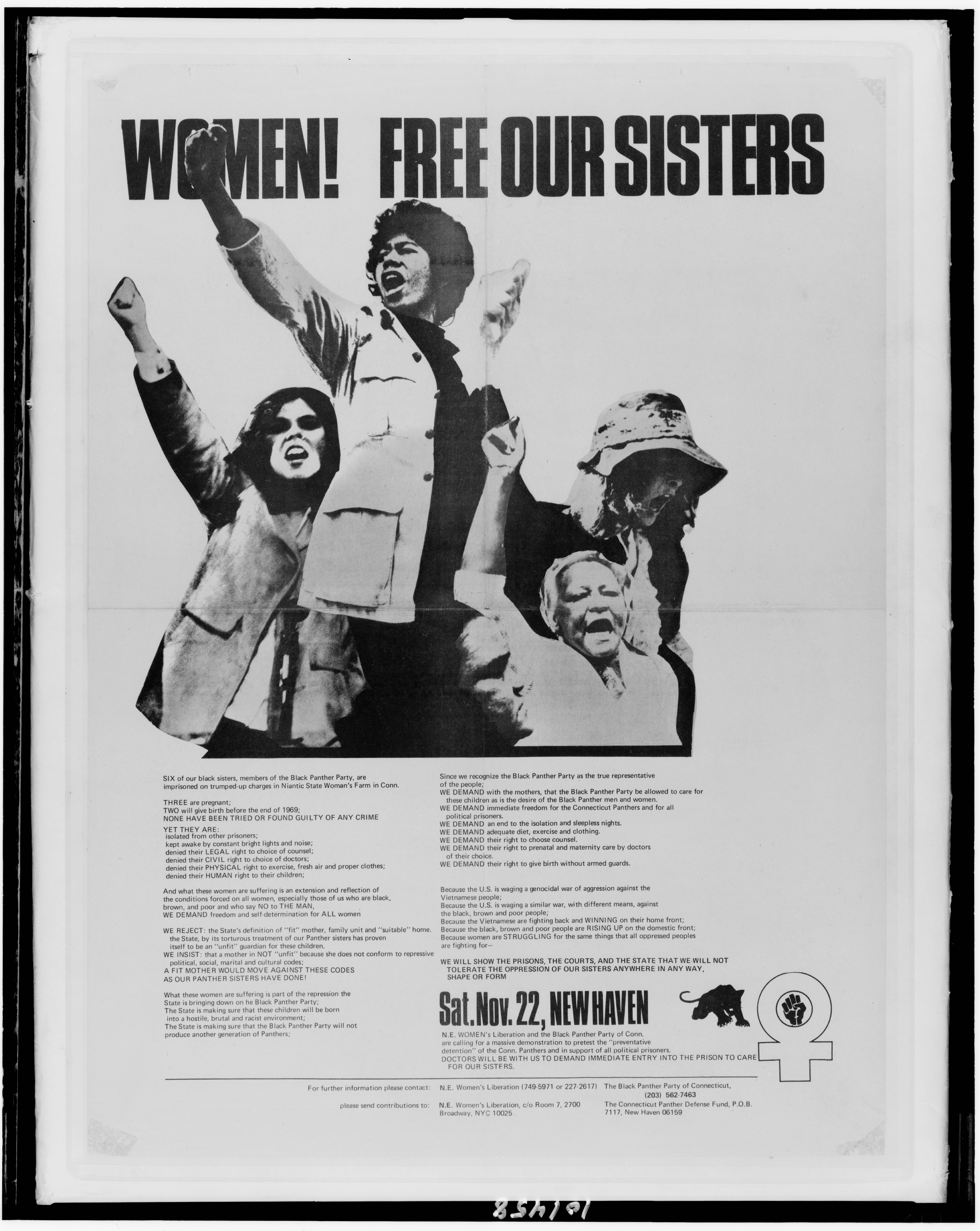
Poster showing four women demonstrating for release of six members of the Black Panther Party from the Niantic State Women's Farm in Connecticut

Nevertheless, women were present in the party from the early days and expanded their roles throughout its life. Women often joined to fight against unequal gender norms. By 1969, the party newspaper officially instructed male Panthers to treat female Party members as equals, a drastic change from the idea of the female Panther as subordinate. The same year, Deputy chairman Fred Hampton of the Illinois chapter conducted a meeting condemning sexism. After 1969, the party considered sexism counterrevolutionary.

The Black Panthers adopted a womanist ideology responding to the unique experiences of African-American women, emphasizing racism as more oppressive than sexism. Womanism was a mix of black nationalism and the vindication of women, putting race and community struggle before the gender issue. Womanism posited that traditional feminism failed to include race and class struggle in its denunciation of male sexism and was therefore part of white hegemony. In opposition to some feminist viewpoints, womanism promoted a vision of gender roles: that men are not above women, but hold a different position in the home and community, so men and women must work together for the preservation of African-American culture and community.

As the birth control pill was regulated throughout the United States in the early 1960s, the role of women as birth givers preserving the livelihood of future generations became stressed on African American women. The introduction of the pill acted as an opening for sexual liberation and autonomy for women to take control of their intimate relationships. However, members of the Black Panthers saw this as a possible hindrance to black liberation and a way of further controlling black bodies, akin to the history of eugenics and forced sterilization. Toni Cade Bambara, a political-social activist, critiques the pill as a benefactor in limiting African American fertility and a form of racial suicide.

Henceforth, the party newspaper portrayed women as intelligent political revolutionaries, exemplified by members such as Kathleen Cleaver, Angela Davis and Erika Huggins. The Black Panther Party newspaper often showed women as active participants in the armed self-defense movement, picturing them with children and guns as protectors of home, family and community.

Police killed or incarcerated many male leaders, but female Panthers were less targeted for much of the 1960s and 1970s. By 1968, women made up two-thirds of the party, while many male members were out of duty. In the absence of much of the original male leadership, women moved into all parts of the organization. Roles included leadership positions, implementing community programs, and uplifting the black community. Women in the group called attention to sexism within the party and worked to make changes from within.

From 1968 to the end of its publication in 1982, the head editors of the Black Panther Party newspaper were all women, including JoNina Abron, its final editor. In 1970, approximately 40% to 70% of Party members were women, and several chapters, like the Des Moines, Iowa, and New Haven, Connecticut, chapters were headed by women.

During the 1970s, recognizing the limited access poor women had to abortion, the party officially supported women's reproductive rights, including abortion. That same year, the party condemned and opposed prostitution.

Many women Panthers began to demand childcare to be able to fully participate in the organization. The party responded by establishing on-site child development centers in multiple US chapters. "Childcare became largely a group activity", with children raised collectively, in accord with the Panther's commitment to collectivism and the African American extended-family tradition. Childcare allowed women Panthers to embrace motherhood while fully participating in Party activism.

The party experienced significant problems in several chapters with sexism and gender oppression, particularly in the Oakland chapter where cases of sexual harassment and gender conflict were common. When Oakland Panthers arrived to bolster the New York City Panther chapter after 21 New York leaders were incarcerated, they displayed such chauvinistic attitudes towards New York Panther women that they had to be fended off at gunpoint. Some Party leaders thought the fight for gender equality was a threat to men and a distraction from the struggle for racial equality.

In response, the Chicago and New York chapters, among others, established equal gender rights as a priority and tried to eradicate sexist attitudes.

By the time the Black Panther Party disbanded, official policy was to reprimand men who violated the rules of gender equality.

=== Gender dynamics ===
In the beginning, recruiting women was a low priority for Newton and Seale. Seale stated in an interview that Newton targeted "brothers who had been pimping, brothers who had been peddling dope, brothers who ain't gonna take no shit, brothers who had been fighting the pigs". Also, they did not realize that women could help the fight until one came into an interest meeting asking about "female leadership". Regina Jennings recalls that many male leaders had an "unchecked" sexism problem, and her task was to "lift the bedroom out of their minds." She remembers overhearing members: "Some concluded that the FBI sent me, but the captain assured them with salty good humor that, 'She's too stupid to be from the FBI.' He thought my cover and my comments too honest, too loud, and too ridiculous to be serious." She recalls her days in Oakland, California as a teenager looking for something to do to add purpose to her life and her community. She grew up around police brutality, so it was nothing new. Her goal in joining was "smashing racism" because she viewed herself as Black before she was a woman. In her community, that identity is what she felt held her back the most.

=== Women's role ===
Black Panther Party Free Food Program flier shows images of Black Panther female activists Angela Davis and Ericka Huggins with the title "10,000 Free Bags of Groceries" for the Black Community Survival Conference in March 1972.

The Black Panther Party was involved in many community projects as part of their organization. These projects included community outreach, like the breakfast program, education, and health programs. In many cases, women were the ones primarily involved with administering these types of programs.

From the beginning of the Black Panther Party, education was a fundamental goal of the organization. This was highlighted in the Ten Point Platform, the newspaper that was distributed by the party, and the public commentary shared by the Panthers. The newspaper was one of the primary and original consciousness-raising and educational measures taken by the party. Despite the fact that men were out distributing the newspaper, women like Elaine Brown and Kathleen Cleaver were behind the scenes working on those papers.

=== Elaine Brown ===
Elaine Brown rose to power within the BPP as Minister of Information after Eldridge Cleaver fled abroad. In 1974, she became chair for the Oakland chapter. She was appointed by Huey Newton, the previous chair, while Newton and other leaders dealt with their legal issues. From the beginning of her tenure as chair, she faced opposition and feared a coup. She appointed many female officials and faced backlash for her policies for equality within the organization. When Huey Newton returned from exile and approved of the beating of a female Panther schoolteacher, Brown left the organization.

=== Gwen Robinson ===
In an interview with Judson Jeffries, Gwen Robinson reflects on her time in the Black Panther Party Detroit Division. She explains that she joined in October 1969 despite doubts from her mother, who had participated in a march with Martin Luther King Jr. in the early part of the decade. She chose the Black Panther Party (BPP) because "[She] felt a closeness and a bond with them" more than other organizations like the "SNCC, NAACP, the Urban League, the Nation of Islam, Shrines of Madonna, Eastside Voice of Independent Detroit (ESVID), the Republic of New Africa, and the Revolutionary Action Movement."

In 12th grade, she decided to work full-time with the party, dropping out of chaotic Denby High School in Detroit. "There were some students who would use the N-word freely" and "a P.E. instructor accused [her] of stealing her keys." She was "shoved" into the pool when she refused to swim for fear of wetting her hair, while a White teacher who taught Afro-American history would kick people out "if you challenged his position on certain Black leaders."

In the BPP, she "was living as part of a collective" where all work was shared, and she enjoyed working all day selling newspapers. She climbed the ranks and became the branch's Communications Secretary in January 1971, after her predecessor left due to "some issues related to sexism". In this branch, unlike the average BPP divisions, the "brothers" never turned violent or physical: "That kind of thing didn't take place in Detroit." She left the organization in 1973, keeping a link through her husband, their circulation manager. Summing up the legacy of the Detroit branch, she says, "It's crucial that people realize that the strength of the organization was rooted in discipline, deep commitment, and a genuine love for the people."

== Connections to other political activist groups ==
=== Latino liberation ===
Members of the Black Panther Party, such as Huey P. Newton, also frequently collaborated with Latino activist groups, like the Brown Berets and Los Siete de la Raza. Newton himself even attended some court sessions for Los Siete de la Raza's trial in June 1970.

Bobby Seale described their alliances with Los Siete as particularly important, they saw that both Black and Brown activist groups had been dealing with similar issues regarding oppression and violence in the United States.

=== Women's and gay liberation movements ===
Huey Newton expressed his support for the women's liberation movement and the gay liberation movement in a 1970 letter published in the newspaper The Black Panther titled "A Letter from Huey to the Revolutionary Brothers and Sisters About the Women's Liberation and Gay Liberation Movements". Written one year after the Stonewall riots, Newton acknowledged women and homosexuals as oppressed groups and urged the Black Panthers to "unite with them in a revolutionary fashion". The Black Panther Party and the Gay Liberation Movement shared common ground in their fight against police brutality.

=== American Indian Movement (AIM) ===
The Black Panther Party also influenced connections with the American Indian Movement, a Native organization that originated in the Twin Cities of Minneapolis and St. Paul, Minnesota in 1968. The American Indian Movement utilized the Panther's Ten Point Program, the Black Patrol, and Black Freedom Schools to form their own civil rights program, the Indian Patrol, and Survival Schools in the Twin Cities. Starting in 1966, Native activists –future AIM members– formed a close connection with the Black Panthers in Minneapolis. During the 1969 occupation of Alcatraz Island and the 1972 occupation of the Bureau of Indian Affairs (BIA), Native activists met with Stokely Carmichael. During the 1973 occupation of Wounded Knee, Angela Davis visited. Throughout, both organizations highlighted the shared parallels of the Black and Indigenous experience, emphasizing their intersectional oppression and a shared history of resistance.

== Aftermath and legacy ==
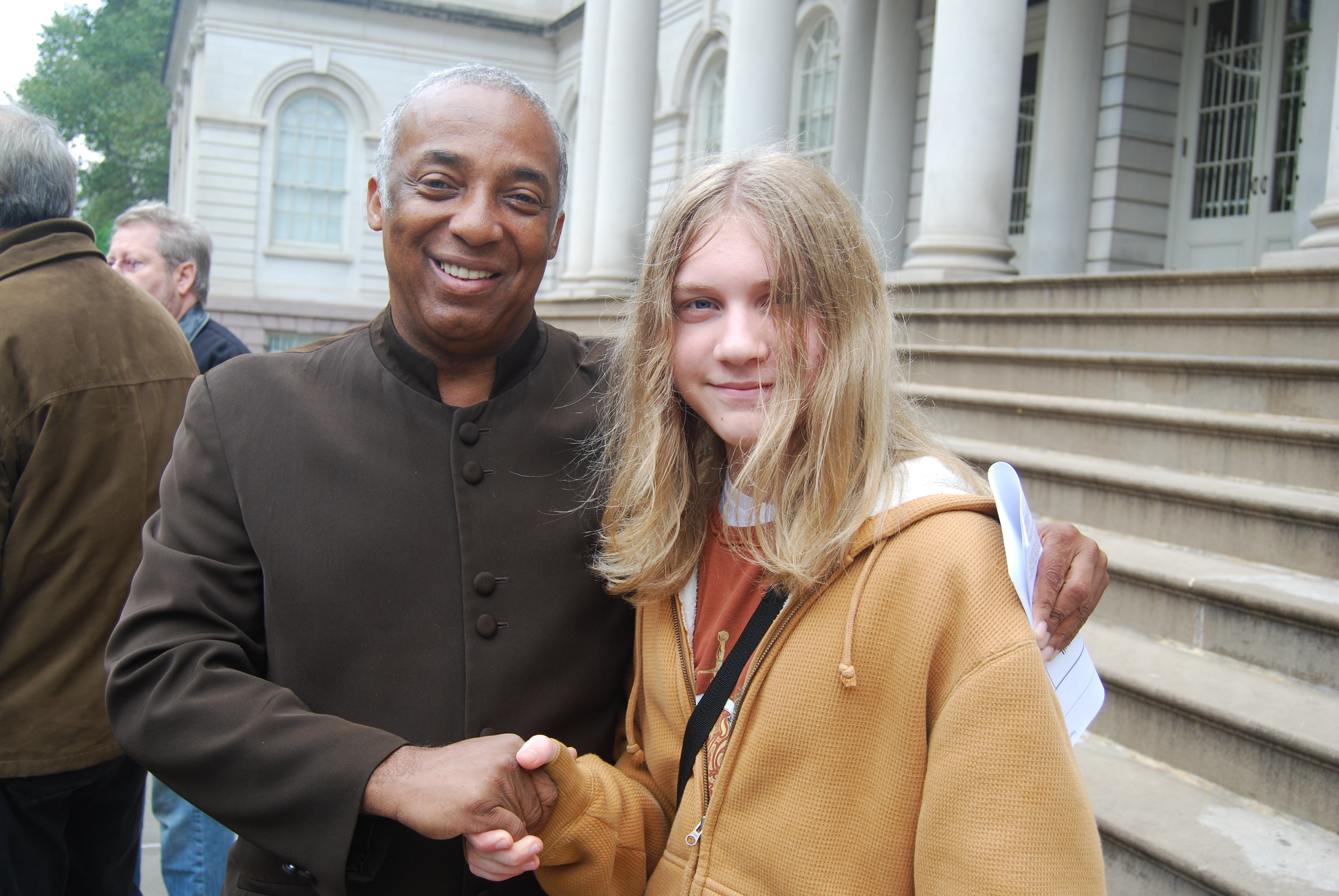
New York City councilman Charles Barron is one of the numerous former Panthers to have held elected office in the US.

There is considerable debate about the impact of the Black Panther Party on the wider society or even their local environments. Author Jama Lazerow writes:

As inheritors of the discipline, pride, and calm self-assurance preached by Malcolm X, the Panthers became national heroes in black communities by infusing abstract nationalism with street toughness—by joining the rhythms of black working-class youth culture to the interracial élan and effervescence of Bay Area New Left politics ... In 1966, the Panthers defined Oakland's ghetto as a territory, the police as interlopers, and the Panther mission as the defense of community. The Panthers' famous "policing the police" drew attention to the spatial remove that White Americans enjoyed from the police brutality that had come to characterize life in black urban communities.

Professor Judson Jeffries of Purdue University called the Panthers "the most effective black revolutionary organization in the 20th century". The Los Angeles Times, in a 2013 review of Black Against Empire, an "authoritative" history of the BPP published by University of California Press, called the organization a "serious political and cultural force" and "a movement of intelligent, explosive dreamers". The Black Panther Party is featured in exhibits and curriculum of the National Civil Rights Museum.

Numerous former Panthers have held elected office in the United States, some into the 21st century; these include Charles Barron (New York City Council), Nelson Malloy (Winston-Salem City Council), and Bobby Rush (US House of Representatives). Most of them praise the BPP's contribution to black liberation and American democracy. In 1990, the Chicago City Council passed a resolution declaring "Fred Hampton Day" in honor of the slain leader. In Winston-Salem in 2012, a large contingent of local officials and community leaders came together to install a historic marker of the local BPP headquarters; State Representative Earline Parmone declared "[The Black Panther Party] dared to stand up and say, 'We're fed up and we're not taking it anymore'. ... Because they had courage, today I stand as ... the first African American ever to represent Forsyth County in the state Senate".

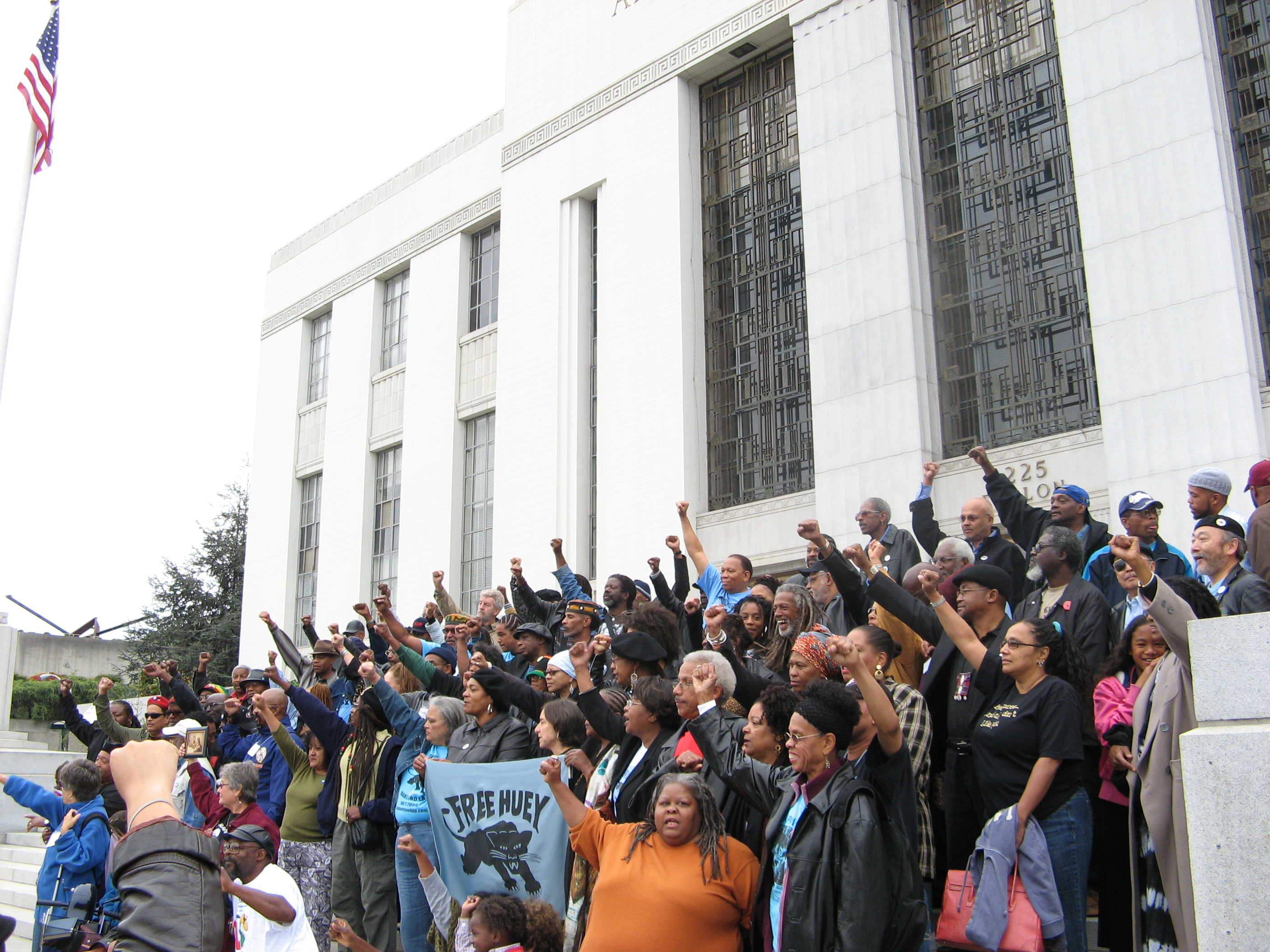
Black Panther 40th Reunion, 2006

In October 2006, the Black Panther Party held a 40-year reunion in Oakland.

In January 2007, a joint California state and Federal task force charged eight men with the August 29, 1971, murder of California police officer Sgt. John Young. The defendants have been identified as former members of the Black Liberation Army, with two linked to the Black Panthers. In 1975, a similar case was dismissed when a judge ruled that police gathered evidence using torture. On June 29, 2009, Herman Bell pleaded guilty to voluntary manslaughter in the death of Sgt. Young. In July 2009, charges were dropped against four of the accused: Ray Boudreaux, Henry W. Jones, Richard Brown and Harold Taylor. Also, that month Jalil Muntaquim pleaded no contest to conspiracy to commit voluntary manslaughter, becoming the second person convicted in this case.

Since the 1990s, former Panther chief of staff David Hilliard has offered tours in Oakland of sites historically significant to the Black Panther Party.

In 2025, the first marker in a Black Panther Party Heritage Trail in Illinois was unveiled.

=== Groups and movements inspired and aided by the Black Panthers ===
Various groups and movements have picked names inspired by the Black Panthers:

- Panther anarchism, also known simply as Black anarchism; an anti-authoritarian, anti-racist movement that combines Black liberation and anarchism, originating from figures like Lucy Parsons and radicalized members of the Black Panther Party.
- Assata's Daughters, an all-black activist group in Chicago, was founded in 2015 by Page May; the group is named after Black Panther Assata Shakur and has objectives similar to the Black Panthers' 10-Point Program.
- Gray Panthers often used to refer to advocates for the rights of seniors (Gray Panthers in the United States, The Grays, Gray Panthers in Germany).
- Polynesian Panthers, an advocacy group for Māori and Pasifika people in New Zealand.
- Black Panthers, a protest movement that advocates social justice and fights for the rights of Mizrahi Jews in Israel.
- White Panthers, used to refer to both the White Panther Party, a far-left, anti-racist, white American political party of the 1970s, as well as the White Panthers UK, an unaffiliated group started by Mick Farren.
- The Pink Panthers, used to refer to two LGBT rights organizations.
- Dalit Panthers of India, an Indian social reform movement, which fights against caste oppression in Indian society. This became the Liberation Panther Party, now a political party in India.
- The British Black Panther movement, which flourished in London in the late 1960s and early 1970s, was not affiliated with the American organization although it fought for many of the same rights.
- The French Black Dragons, a Black antifascist group closely linked to the punk rock and rockabilly scene.
- The Young Lords, which fought for Latino self-determination and Puerto-Rican independence.
- Huey P. Newton Gun Club, named after the Black Panther Party's founder.
- Memphis Black Autonomy Federation, a Memphis, Tennessee-based community group adhering to the Panther anarchism ideology and led by former Black Panther Party member Lorenzo Kom'boa Ervin.
- Black Lion Party headed by Paul Birdsong made itself known in Philadelphia at anti-ICE protests following the Killing of Renée Good and Alex Pretti.

In April 1977, Panthers were key supporters of the 504 Sit-ins, the longest of which was the 25-day occupation of the San Francisco Federal Building by over 120 people with disabilities. Panthers provided daily home-cooked meals in support of the protest's eventual success, which eventually led to the Americans with Disabilities Act (ADA) thirteen years later.

New Black Panther Party

In 1989, a "New Black Panther Party" was formed in Dallas, Texas. Ten years later, the NBPP became home to many former Nation of Islam members when its chairmanship was taken by Khalid Abdul Muhammad.

The Anti-Defamation League and the Southern Poverty Law Center list the New Black Panthers as a black separatist hate group. The Huey Newton Foundation, former chairman and co-founder Bobby Seale, and members of the original Black Panther Party have insisted that this New Black Panther Party is illegitimate and they have strongly objected to it, stating that there "is no new Black Panther Party".

== In popular media ==
=== Books ===
Many former members of the Black Panther Party have gone on to write books and memoirs about their experiences in the party, such as Revolutionary Suicide, the autobiography of Huey P. Newton, Seize the Time by Bobby Seale, Assata: An Autobiography by Assata Shakur, A Taste of Power by Elaine Brown, and many more.

The 2021 graphic novel, The Black Panther Party by David F. Walker, is a collection of biographies of fifteen BPP leaders.

=== Film and TV ===
- The Black Panther Party briefly appeared in 1994's Forrest Gump.
- The 1995 film Panther, based on the novel of the same name by Melvin Van Peebles, is a fictionalized account of the founding of the Black Panther Party, and the first feature-length narrative film to take the BPP as its topic.
- The Americans 2013
- The film Seberg (2019), directed by Benedict Andrews, stars Kristen Stewart as the actress Jean Seberg, who was persecuted by the FBI's COINTELPRO program for her public and financial support of the Black Panther Party.
- Aaron Sorkin's 2020 Netflix film, The Trial of the Chicago 7, features the Chicago Seven trial that included Bobby Seale, portrayed by Yahya Abdul-Mateen II.
- The 2021 film Judas and the Black Messiah, starring Daniel Kaluuya, tells the story of Fred Hampton and his Chicago BPP chapter.
- The series The Big Cigar (2024), by Apple TV+, follows Huey Newton's escape to Havana, Cuba in 1974 to avoid legal charges.

=== Art ===
In 2019, the Museum of Modern Art acquired 30 issues of the Black Panther newspaper for its permanent collection. In 2021, they were featured in a show and series of events highlighting the importance of the paper's artwork, with a selection to be placed on permanent display.

NFL quarterback and Black Lives Matter activist Colin Kaepernick worked with the former Black Panther newspaper illustrator and "Minister of Culture" Emory Douglas to create the cover art of his book Abolition for the People: The Movement For a Future without Policing and Prisons (2023).

== See also ==
- Black Panther Party in Algeria
- Black Panther Party, Winston-Salem, North Carolina Chapter
- British Black Panthers
- Black Panther Party, Des Moines, Iowa Chapter
- Israeli Black Panthers
- White Panthers
