= Edward Greer =

American army major general (1924–2025)

- Born: March 8, 1924; Gary, West Virginia, U.S.
- Died: January 29, 2025 (aged 100); El Paso, Texas, U.S.
- Military career
- Allegiance: United States of America
- Branch: United States Army
- Service years: 1943–1945; 1948–1976
- Rank: Major General
- Commands: 108th Artillery Group
- Conflicts: World War II; Korean War; Vietnam War
- Awards: Silver Star; Legion of Merit (2); Bronze Star "V" device (2)

Edward Greer (March 8, 1924 – January 29, 2025) was a United States Army major general.

== Early life and enlisted service ==
Greer was born and grew up in Gary, West Virginia. He enrolled at West Virginia State University, which had a mandatory ROTC requirement, with the intent of becoming a dentist before enlisting in the Army in 1943 after his freshman year. He served in the 777th Field Artillery Battalion and was discharged as a master sergeant. Greer returned to West Virginia State after the war and was commissioned a second lieutenant in field artillery after graduating in 1948.

== Career as a commissioned officer ==
Greer was initially stationed at Fort Riley after commissioning. He served as a forward observer with 159th Field Artillery Battalion attached to the 25th Infantry Division in the Korean War and was awarded the Silver Star and the Bronze Star for valor. Greer was promoted to captain while in Korea and was posted to Germany after his deployment to Korea followed by an assignment to the Pentagon with the Army General Staff, during which time he attended graduate school at George Washington University.

Greer, then a colonel, deployed to Vietnam in 1970 as the deputy commander of XXIV Corps Artillery before taking command of the 108th Artillery Group. During his deployment he was awarded the Legion of Merit, the Air Medal and the Vietnamese Cross of Gallantry. In 1972, Greer was promoted to the rank of brigadier general. After serving as the deputy commanding general of Fort Leonard Wood, Missouri, he was assigned to be the deputy commanding general at the U.S. Army Military Personnel Center in Washington, D.C., in 1972 and promoted to major general later that year. Greer retired from the Army in 1976.

== Later life and death ==
Greer moved to El Paso, Texas after retirement from the Army and became a realtor. He turned 100 on March 8, 2024, and died in El Paso on January 29, 2025.
