= Robert Evans Greer =

United States Air Force general

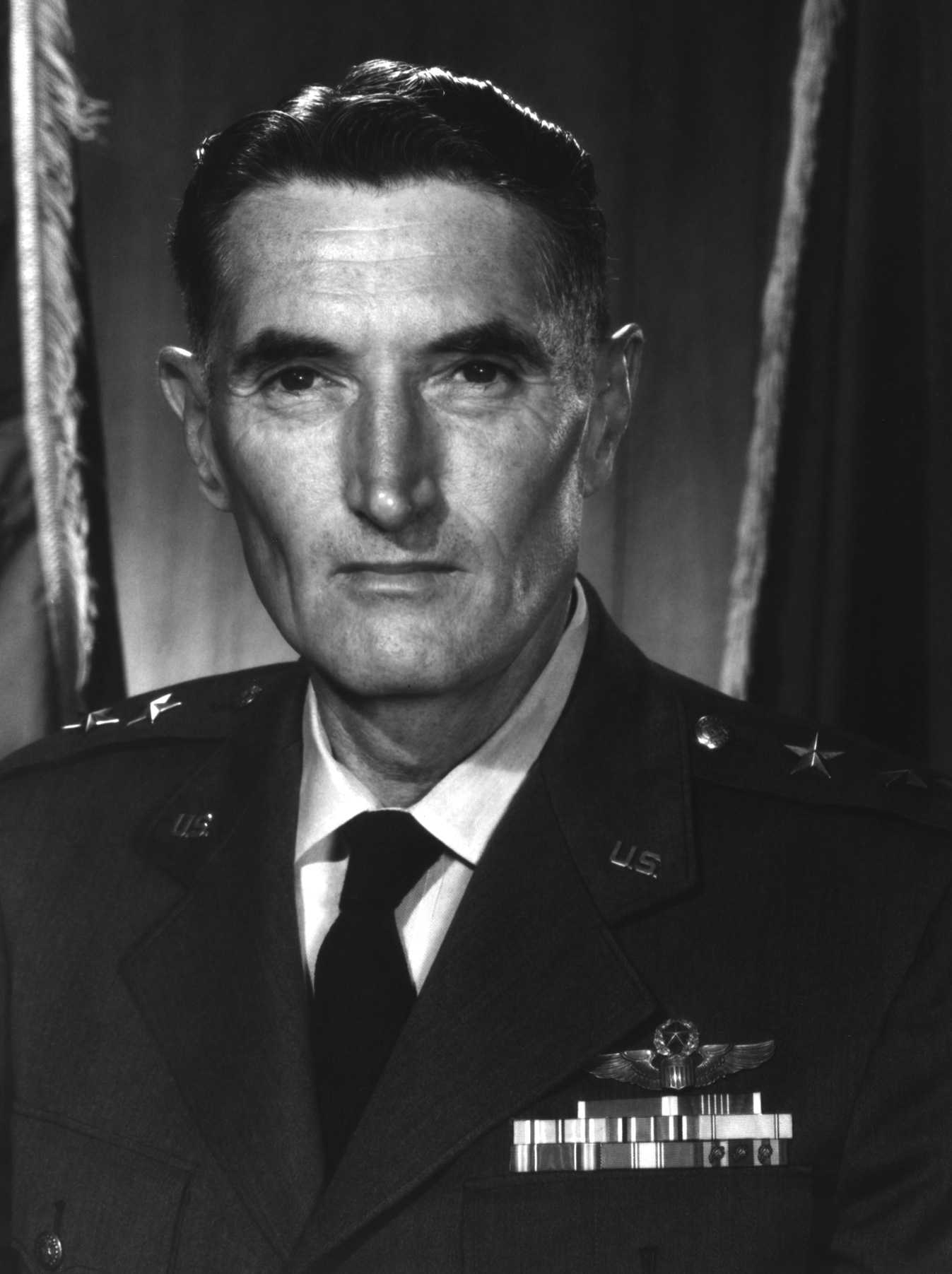
- Born: 7 August 1915; Orange, California, U.S.
- Died: 11 February 1976 (aged 60); Escondido, California, U.S.
- Burial place: Westminster Memorial Park, Westminster, California
- Military career
- Allegiance: United States
- Branch: United States Army (1939–1947); United States Air Force (1947–1965)
- Service years: 1939–1965
- Rank: Major General
- Service number: AO-21910
- Conflicts: World War II: China-Burma-India Theater; Air raids on Japan; Occupation of Japan
- Awards: Legion of Merit; Army Commendation Medal

Robert Evans Greer (7 August 1915 – 11 February 1976) was a United States Air Force (USAF) officer who attained the rank of major general. A graduate of the United States Military Academy at West Point, New York, where he was ranked 175th in the class of 1939, he served in China and the Mariana Islands during World War II. After the war he served in the USAF Office of the Assistant for Atomic Energy and as vice commander of the Space Systems Division of the Air Force Systems Command.

== Early life ==
Robert Evans Greer was born in Orange, California, on 7 August 1915, the son of Jack and Agnes May Greer. His father was a captain in the United States Army Air Corps, and the family moved frequently. He was attended Coronado High School on California, Manila Central High School in the Philippines, and Huntington Beach High School in California, from whence he graduated in 1932. He then attended Santa Ana Junior College from 1933 to 1934, and Millard's Preparatory School in Washington, DC.

In 1935, Greer secured an appointment to the United States Military Academy at West Point, New York, from Senator Carter Glass of Virginia, and entered on 1 July 1935. He played College football in all four of his years at West Point. He also participated in athletics, and, in his last two years, the Hundredth Night Shows, demonstrating his ability as a dancer. He graduated on 12 June 1939, ranked 175th in the Class of 1939, and was commissioned as a second lieutenant in the Coast Artillery Corps.

== World War II ==
Greer first attended the Primary Flying School at Glendale, California from 12 September to 22 December 1939, then the Basic Flying School at Randolph Field, Texas, from 2 January to 12 March 1940, and finally the Advanced Flying School at Kelly Field, Texas, from which he graduated on 22 June 1940. He remained there as an instructor until 1 January 1941, with the rank of first lieutenant in the Army of the United States from 9 September 1940. He was assigned to Gunter Field in Alabama, and then Hendricks Army Airfield in Florida, as the post engineering officer. He was promoted to captain on 1 February and major on 26 September 1942. He married Geraldine Roberts in December 1939; by August 1945 they had four children: Virginia, Robert, James and Gery.

On 9 October 1943, Greer joined the 58th Bombardment Wing at Smoky Hill Army Air Field, Kansas, as its assistant operations officer (A-3), with the rank of lieutenant colonel from 5 February 1944. In March, he became part of the first Boeing B-29 Superfortress air crew to depart for the China-Burma-India Theater. From 2 August 1944 to 8 February 1945, he served on the staff of the XX Bomber Command. The B-29s suffered from numerous mechanical problems owing to their being rushed into service, and their engines lasted only about 50 hours of running time before they needed to be replaced. Greer arranged for 250 engines to be flown in from Casablanca to Calcutta. For his service with the XX Bomber Command, he was awarded the Legion of Merit. The 58th Bombardment Wing moved to Tinian in the Mariana Islands in March 1945, and Greer became its deputy chief of staff for supply and maintenance (A-4). After the war ended he served on Iwo Jima and then Hokkaido.

== Postwar ==
Greer returned to the United States in September 1945, in a record-setting long-distance flight from Hokkaido to Chicago. His first post-war assignment was at Wright Field, Ohio, as assistant to the chief of administration for technical matters of the Air Materiel Command from 1 February to 29 August 1946. He was then selected as an instructor in electrical engineering at West Point. As a preliminary, he attended Columbia University from 26 September 1946 to 26 May 1947. He then taught at West Point until 22 July 1949. He transferred to the newly formed United States Air Force (USAF) on 1 July 1948, and on 23 July 1949 he was assigned to USAF Headquarters at The Pentagon in Washington, DC, where he worked in the Office of the Assistant for Atomic Energy. He was promoted to colonel on 22 June 1950. He attended the Air War College, remaining as an instructor after graduation in 1953. He was posted to Supreme Headquarters Allied Powers Europe (SHAPE) in Paris in July 1954, to serve on the staff of British Field Marshal Lord Montgomery. Afterwards he joined the staff of the 49th Air Division in the UK, and then the Third Air Force there as its director of operations and deputy chief of staff for operations.

In July 1957, Greer returned to USAF Headquarters as the deputy assistant chief of staff and then, in July 1959, assistant chief of staff for guided missiles with the rank of brigadier general. He then became the Air Force Ballistic Missile Division's vice commander for satellite systems. In the wake of a reorganization of the Air Research and Development Command and the Air Materiel Command on 1 April 1961, he became the vice commander of the Air Force Systems Command's Space Systems Division (SSD), which was based at Inglewood and later El Segundo, California. He was promoted to major general in July 1961. As vice commander of SSD, was also head of the SAMOS Program Office. As such, he reported directly to the Under Secretary of the Air Force, Joseph V. Charyk. He was also the West Coast director in the USAF Office of Missile and Satellite Systems. In July 1961, the SAMOS Project Office became the USAF element of the National Reconnaissance Office (NRO). The USAF element became Program A on 23 July 1962, and embraced both the NRO Defense Meteorological Satellite Program and the secret reconnaissance satellite programs.

Greer retired on 1 July 1965, but elected to remain in southern California. He became president of a division of Rockwell International. He died from pancreatic cancer in Escondido, California on 11 February 1976, and was buried in Westminster Memorial Park in Westminster, California.

== Dates of rank ==
Insignia	Rank	Component	Date	Reference
	Second lieutenant	Coast Artillery Corps	12 June 1939	
	First lieutenant	Army of the United States	9 September 1940	
	Captain	Army of the United States	1 February 1942	
	First lieutenant	Air Corps	12 June 1942	
	Major	Army of the United States	26 September 1942	
	Lieutenant colonel	Army of the United States	5 February 1944	
	Lieutenant colonel	United States Air Force	1 July 1948	
	Lieutenant colonel	United States Air Force	22 June 1948	
	Colonel	United States Air Force	22 June 1950	
	Brigadier general	United States Air Force	1959	
	Major general	United States Air Force	July 1961	
