= Bobby Hutton =

Treasurer of the Black Panther Party (1950–1968

Bobby James Hutton
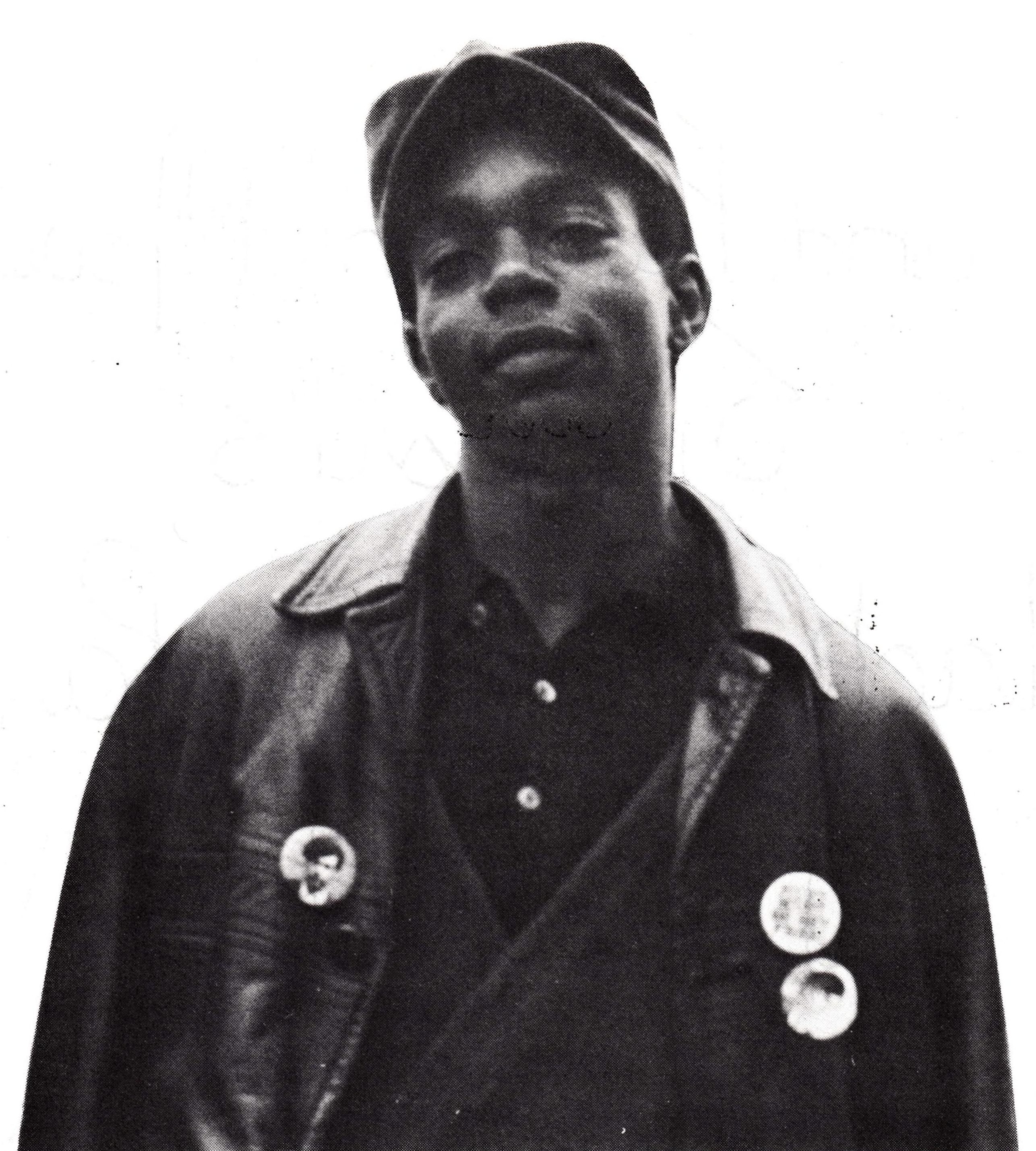
- Born: Robert James Hutton; April 21, 1950; Jefferson County, Arkansas, U.S.
- Died: April 6, 1968 (aged 17); Oakland, California, U.S.
- Cause of death: Police shooting
- Resting place: Mountain View Cemetery, Oakland, California, U.S.
- Other name: Bobby Joe Hutton
- Occupations: Political activist, Treasurer of Black Panther Party
- Organization: Black Panther Party (1966–1968)
- Movement: Black Power Movement, Black Liberation Movement

Robert James Hutton (April 21, 1950 – April 6, 1968), also known as Lil' Bobby, was the treasurer and first recruit to join the Black Panther Party. Alongside Eldridge Cleaver and other Panthers, he was involved in a confrontation with Oakland police that wounded two officers. Hutton was killed by the police in disputed circumstances.

Cleaver stated Hutton was shot while surrendering with his hands up, while police stated he ignored commands and tried to flee.

== Early life ==
Bobby Hutton was one of three children, born in Jefferson County, Arkansas, to John D. Hutton and Dolly Mae Mitchner-Hutton. When he was three years old, his family moved to Oakland, California during the second wave of the Great Migration, after they were visited by nightriders intimidating and threatening Black residents in the area.

== Black Panther Party ==
Hutton met Black Panther Party founders Huey Newton and Bobby Seale at the North Oakland Neighborhood Anti-Poverty Center, a "government-funded agency that employed local youth to work on community service projects." In October 1966, 16-year-old Hutton became the first member and the first treasurer of the Black Panther Party. In May 1967, he was one of thirty Panthers who traveled to the California state capitol in Sacramento to demonstrate against the Mulford Act, a bill that would prohibit carrying loaded firearms in public. The group walked into the state assembly armed. Hutton and four other Panthers were arrested.

== Death ==
On the night of April 6, 1968, Hutton was killed by Oakland Police officers after Eldridge Cleaver led him and twelve other Panthers in a confrontation with the Oakland Police, during which two officers were seriously wounded by gunfire. The confrontation, which lasted roughly an hour and a half and which took place at a house in West Oakland, drew to a close when the police tear-gassed the house and Hutton and Cleaver surrendered. One impetus for the confrontation was the assassination of Martin Luther King Jr.

Despite the fact that he had instructed Hutton to strip down to his underwear to demonstrate that he was unarmed, Eldridge Cleaver stated that police shot Hutton more than twelve times as he was surrendering. Another account from Kathleen Cleaver states that Hutton was embarrassed to remove his clothing and so he only took off his shirt and kept on his pants, while the police maintained that he attempted to run away and ignored orders to stop.

Eldridge Cleaver stated that Hutton was shot by the police with his hands up. Cleaver also claimed that an Oakland police officer who witnessed the shoot-out later told him: "What they did was first-degree murder." Cleaver and two police officers were also wounded. Bobby Seale, a fellow Black Panther, has since speculated that the police shot Bobby Hutton thinking they were shooting him.

Hutton's funeral was held on April 12 at the Ephesians Church of God in Berkeley, California. About 1,500 people attended the funeral. A rally held afterwards at the Alameda County Courthouse near Lake Merritt in Oakland which was attended by over 2,000 people, and included a eulogy by actor Marlon Brando. He was buried at Mountain View Cemetery in Oakland.

Bobby Hutton's death at the hands of the Oakland police was seen by those sympathetic to the Black Panther Party as an example of police brutality against black people. Hutton was the first Panther to die and "immediately became a martyr for the cause of black power."

== Legacy ==
DeFremery Park in West Oakland, California, was unofficially named after Bobby Hutton not long after his death and is now known locally as "Lil' Bobby Hutton Park". "Lil' Bobby Hutton Day" has been held annually at the park since April 1998. Organized by family members and former Black Panther Party members, the memorial event features speakers, performers, and art works commemorating Hutton's black consciousness and dedication to the party.

Huey P. Newton's 1973 autobiography Revolutionary Suicide, is dedicated to Hutton.

== In popular culture ==
Hutton has been referenced frequently in popular culture. He was portrayed by Wesley Jonathan in the 1995 movie Panther.

He is mentioned in Tupac Shakur's "Ghetto Gospel," Paris' "Panther Power" (1990), The Coup's "Get Up" (2001), Smif-N-Wessun’s "Still Fighting" (2007), Sa-Roc's "Lost Sunz" (2014), Bhi Bhiman's "Up in Arms" (2015), Bambu's verse from Rocky Rivera's "Headhunter," and Clipping's "Blood of the Fang" (2019). Also, Curly Castro of Shrapnkel off Backwoodz Studios named his debut album "Little Robert Hutton"

In the 2009 Chain and the Gang song Deathbed Confession Ian Svenonius lists Hutton along with JFK, MLK, Malcolm X, George Jackson, Fred Hampton, and "all the rest" as having been assassinated by reactionary US government agencies.

A photo of Hutton in front of the Oakland City Jail appeared on the cover of Primal Scream's 1997 single "Star." Country Joe and the Fish dedicated their 1968 LP Together to Hutton. Hutton's story is featured in the young adult novel One Crazy Summer by Rita Williams-Garcia.
