= Reggie Forte =

Black Panther founder

Reginald Westley Forte (1949–1997) was one of the founding members of the Black Panther Party.

== Background ==
Forte was born on March 31, 1949, in Birmingham, Alabama to Leavy II and Helen (Demand) Forte. He and his family relocated to Emeryville, California in 1959. Later, the family moved to Oakland, California where Forte attended Oakland Tech High School. He had two brothers, Sherwin and Leavy III. He had one daughter, Marcella Anne Forte, three grandsons, Anthony Narcisse, Dione and Darrell Narcisse, one niece, Tosha Forte, and one nephew, Leavy Forte IV.

=== Ancestors ===
Census records from the 1900s show that Reggie's forefather was one of three brothers, Caze, Washington, and Preston Forte. They owned their own land in a town called Eufaula, Alabama. Each brother raised 11 children. They lived as a "clan" to protect each other from the Ku Klux Klan (KKK).

One of Forte's forefathers seized the opportunity to emigrate to Liberia with his family. In 1868, Willis Forte sailed on the Golconda, with his wife Paulina, son Wiley, daughter Catherine, and another son Charles. Later, as Wiley took a wife, he established a town called Forteville that still thrives today.

An incident arose in the 1930s between the Ku Klux Klan and the family. The story is documented in the book Witness to Injustice by David Frost, Jr. One of the Forte men went to town and had a fight with a white man. A knife was involved and both men were injured. When Forte made it home to Eufaula, the women and children moved into the woods for protection, while the men prepared for a fight. The next day a group of klansmen came to seek revenge at the Forte compound. They stopped at a country store to load up on supplies. When asked by the store owner where they were headed, the Klan leader said, "to get those Forte's." The proprietor told them they'd need a lot more ammunition and supplies and a lunch because they were going to be gone for a long time. He explained that some of the Forte's could shoot the leaves off of trees from one hundred yards, and they would be ready to fight. The Klan reconsidered and went home.

== Joining the Panthers ==
In 1963, Reginald's maternal step-grandmother was a victim of the 16th Street Baptist Church bombing in Birmingham. She survived, but never fully recovered from her wounds. While in high school, Reginald met Bobby Seale and Huey P. Newton and with his older brother Sherwin, joined them to patrol neighbourhoods in Richmond, Oakland, Berkeley and San Francisco to monitor the police. They often followed the arrested to the police department, and would frequently pay their bail. The Panthers always (legally) displayed their weapons publicly.

In 1967, Reginald, Sherwin, Lil' Bobbie Hutton, Big Man, Bobby Seale and others went to Sacramento, California's state capitol, to introduce their Ten Point Platform and to demonstrate their opposition to a law that made it illegal to bear firearms in public.

== Death ==
Reginald died February 18, 1997, in San Jose, California.
