= Poe v. Ullman =

- Supreme Court of the United States

Argued March 1–2, 1961 Decided June 19, 1961
- Full case name: Poe et al. v. Ullman, State's Attorney
- Citations: 367 U.S. 497 (more) 81 S. Ct. 1752; 6 L. Ed. 2d 989

Case history
- Prior: 147 Conn. 48, 156 A.2d 508 (1959); probable jurisdiction noted, 362 U.S. 987 (1960).
- Subsequent: Rehearing denied, 368 U.S. 869 (1961).

Holding
- The ripeness doctrine prevents bringing claims to challenge criminal statutes that are not enforced.

Court membership
- Chief Justice Earl Warren Associate Justices Hugo Black · Felix Frankfurter; William O. Douglas · Tom C. Clark; John M. Harlan II · William J. Brennan Jr. Charles E. Whittaker · Potter Stewart

Case opinions
- Plurality: Frankfurter, joined by Warren, Clark, Whitaker
- Concurrence: Brennan (in judgment)
- Dissent: Douglas
- Dissent: Harlan
- Dissent: Stewart
- Dissent: Black

Poe v. Ullman, 367 U.S. 497 (1961), was a United States Supreme Court case declining to exercise pre-enforcement judicial review of a Connecticut law banning the use of contraceptives and preventing doctors from recommending them. The lawsuit was deemed unripe because after the challenged law's 1879 enactment, it had only been cited in a single 1940 prosecution, and drug stores openly sold contraceptives. Five years later, Planned Parenthood League of Connecticut Executive Director Estelle Griswold appealed her conviction under this law, securing its overturning in Griswold v. Connecticut.

== Procedural history ==
Plaintiffs appealed from the Connecticut Supreme Court of Errors (Buxton v. Ullman, 147 Conn. 48) which upheld that the use of contraceptive devices was prohibited and that, furthermore, doctors could not provide medical advice in the use of contraceptive devices, even for married couples, and even if pregnancy could constitute a serious threat to the health or life of the female spouse. A doctor and patients sought review of the law under Fourteenth Amendment concerns, by suing the State's Attorney. The trial court held that the state legislature had authority to pass the law (Conn. Gen. Stat. §§53-23 and 54-196) under its state police power to affect the public health, safety, morals, or welfare. The trial court cited its responsibility to obey the legislature's will and not weaken its legislative powers.

== Harlan's dissent ==
Justice Harlan dissented and, reaching the merits, took a broad view of the "liberty" protected by the Fourteenth Amendment's Due Process Clause to include not merely state violations of one of the first eight amendments which had been held to be "incorporated" in the Fourteenth, but against any law which imposed on "liberty" unjustifiably. Harlan described the "liberty" protected by that clause as "a rational continuum which, broadly speaking, includes a freedom from all substantial arbitrary impositions and purposeless restraints."

Justice Harlan summarizes his view of the scope and content of substantive due process protection is this passage:

Due process has not been reduced to any formula; its content cannot be determined by reference to any code. The best that can be said is that, through the course of this Court's decisions, it has represented the balance which our Nation, built upon postulates of respect for the liberty of the individual, has struck between that liberty and the demands of organized society. ... The balance of which I speak is the balance struck by this country, having regard to what history teaches are the traditions from which it developed as well as the traditions from which it broke. That tradition is a living thing. A decision of this Court which radically departs from it could not long survive, while a decision which builds on what has survived is likely to be sound. No formula could serve as a substitute, in this area, for judgment and restraint.

Justice Harlan also noted that laws regulating homosexuality, fornication, and adultery could be permitted under this analysis:

Yet the very inclusion of the category of morality among state concerns indicates that society is not limited in its objects only to the physical well-being of the community, [367 U.S. 497, 546] but has traditionally concerned itself with the moral soundness of its people as well. Indeed to attempt a line between public behavior and that which is purely consensual or solitary would be to withdraw from community concern a range of subjects with which every society in civilized times has found it necessary to deal. The laws regarding marriage which provide both when the sexual powers may be used and the legal and societal context in which children are born and brought up, as well as laws forbidding adultery, fornication and homosexual practices which express the negative of the proposition, confining sexuality to lawful marriage, form a pattern so deeply pressed into the substance of our social life that any Constitutional doctrine in this area must build upon that basis. Compare McGowan v. Maryland, 366 U.S. 420 . Adultery, homosexuality and the like are sexual intimacies which the State forbids altogether, but the intimacy of husband and wife is necessarily an essential and accepted feature of the institution of marriage, an institution which the State not only must allow, but which always and in every age it has fostered and protected. It is one thing when the State exerts its power either to forbid extramarital sexuality altogether, or to say who may marry, but it is quite another when, having acknowledged a marriage and the intimacies inherent in it, it undertakes to regulate by means of the criminal law the details of that intimacy.

== Douglas's dissent ==
Justice Douglas's general view that the Bill of Rights' guarantees, broadly construed, overlapped to produce social spheres and Associations insulated from government interference separate from the core political purposes of the Bill of Rights became the majority opinion in Griswold v. Connecticut.

Douglas addressed the First Amendment rights of doctors.

The right of the doctor to advise his patients according to his best lights seems so obviously within First Amendment rights as to need no extended discussion. The leading cases on freedom of expression are generally framed with reference to public debate and discourse. But, as Chafee said, "the First Amendment and other parts of the law erect a fence inside which men can talk. The lawmakers, legislators, and officials stay on the outside of that fence. But what the men inside the fence say when they are let alone is no concern of the law." The Blessings of Liberty (1956), p. 108. The teacher (Sweezy v. New Hampshire, 354 U. S. 234) as well as the public speaker (Thomas v. Collins, 323 U. S. 516) is included. The actor on stage or screen, the artist whose creation is in oil or clay or marble, the poet whose reading public may be practically nonexistent, the musician and his musical scores, the counselor whether priest, parent or teacher no matter how small his audience -- these too are beneficiaries of freedom of expression. The remark by President James A. Garfield that his ideal of a college was a log in the woods with a student at one end and Mark Hopkins at another (9 Dict.Am.Biog., p. 216) puts the present problem in proper First Amendment dimensions. Of course a physician can talk freely and fully with his patient without threat of retaliation by the State. The contrary thought -- the one endorsed sub silentio by the courts below -- has the cast of regimentation about it, a cast at war with the philosophy and presuppositions of this free society.

Douglas next addressed the rights of married couples, contending that the Connecticut's Law barring the use of contraceptives would be impossible to enforce without violating the First, Third, Fourth, or Fifth Amendments.

The regulation, as applied in this case, touches the relationship between man and wife. It reaches into the intimacies of the marriage relationship. If we imagine a regime of full enforcement of the law in the manner of an Anthony Comstock, we would reach the point where search warrants issued and officers appeared in bedrooms to find out what went on. It is said that this is not that case. And so it is not. But when the State makes "use" a crime, and applies the criminal sanction to man and wife, the State has entered the innermost sanctum of the home. If it can make this law, it can enforce it. And proof of its violation necessarily involves an inquiry into the relations between man and wife.

That is an invasion of the privacy that is implicit in a free society. A noted theologian who conceives of the use of a contraceptive as a "sin" nonetheless admits that a "use" statute such as this enters a forbidden domain. ". . . the Connecticut statute confuses the moral and legal, in that it transposes without further ado a private sin into a public crime. The criminal act here is the private use of contraceptives. The real area where the coercions of law might, and ought to, be applied, at least to control an evil -- namely, the contraceptive industry -- is quite overlooked. As it stands, the statute is, of course, unenforceable without police invasion of the bedroom, and is therefore indefensible as a piece of legal draughtsmanship." Murray, We Hold These Truths (1960), pp. 157-158.

This notion of privacy is not drawn from the blue. It emanates from the totality of the constitutional scheme under which we live. "One of the earmarks of the totalitarian understanding of society is that it seeks to make all subcommunities -- family, school, business, press, church -- completely subject to control by the State. The State then is not one vital institution among others: a policeman, a referee, and a source of initiative for the common good. Instead, it seeks to be coextensive with family and school, press, business community, and the Church, so that all of these component interest groups are, in principle, reduced to organs and agencies of the State. In a democratic political order, this megatherian concept is expressly rejected as out of accord with the democratic understanding of social good, and with the actual makeup of the human community. Can there be any doubt that a Bill of Rights that, in time of peace, bars soldiers from being quartered in a home "without the consent of the Owner" should also bar the police from investigating the intimacies of the marriage relation? The idea of allowing the State that leeway is congenial only to a totalitarian regime.

While Griswold v. Connecticut's conception of privacy was later characterized as establishing heightened scrutiny of bans upon contraception, Douglas rejected such an approach.

If a State banned completely the sale of contraceptives in drug stores, the case would be quite different. It might seem to some or to all judges an unreasonable restriction. Yet it might not be irrational to conclude that a better way of dispensing those articles is through physicians. The same might be said of a state law banning the manufacture of contraceptives. Health, religious, and moral arguments might be marshalled pro and con. Yet it is not for judges to weigh the evidence. Where either the sale or the manufacture is put under regulation, the strictures are on business and commercial dealings that have had a long history with the police power of the States.

The present law, however, deals not with sale, not with manufacture, but with use. It provides:

"Any person who uses any drug, medicinal article or instrument for the purpose of preventing conception shall be fined not less than fifty dollars or imprisoned not less than sixty days nor more than one year or be both fined and imprisoned."

Conn.Gen.Stat.1958, § 53-32.

Douglas also emphasized that he believed all of the Bill of Rights applied to the States, consistent with Justice Black's dissent in Adamson v. California.

The first eight Amendments to the Constitution have been made applicable to the States only in part. My view has been that, when the Fourteenth Amendment was adopted, its Due Process Clause incorporated all of those Amendments. See Adamson v. California, 332 U. S. 46, 332 U. S. 68 (dissenting opinion). As MR. JUSTICE BRENNAN recently stated, "The Bill of Rights is the primary source of expressed information as to what is meant by constitutional liberty. The safeguards enshrined in it are deeply etched in the foundations of America's freedoms."

The Bill of Rights and the States (1961), 36 N.Y.U.L.Rev. 761, 776. When the Framers wrote the Bill of Rights, they enshrined in the form of constitutional guarantees those rights -- in part substantive, in part procedural -- which experience indicated were indispensable to a free society. Some would disagree as to their importance; the debate concerning them did indeed start before their adoption and has continued to this day. Yet the constitutional conception of "due process" must, in my view, include them all until and unless there are amendments that remove them. That has indeed been the view of a full court of nine Justices, though the members who make up that court unfortunately did not sit at the same time. [Footnote 8]

[Footnote 8] I start with Justices Bradley, Swayne, Field, Clifford and Harlan. To this number, Mr. Justice Brewer can probably be joined on the basis of his agreement "in the main" with Mr. Justice Harlan in O'Neil v. Vermont, 144 U. S. 323, 144 U. S. 371. See the Appendix to MR. JUSTICE BLACK's dissent in Adamson v. California, supra, 332 U. S. 120-123. To these I add MR. JUSTICE BLACK, Mr. Justice Murphy, Mr. Justice Rutledge and myself (Adamson v. California, supra, 332 U. S. 68, 332 U. S. 123).

== Impact ==
Justice Harlan's general view has had enormous influence on the modern Supreme Court; Justice David Souter endorsed the general reasoning behind Justice Harlan's test in his concurrence in 1997's Washington v. Glucksberg. Souter wrote that Harlan's dissent used substantive due process, and recent cases demonstrated the "legitimacy of the modern justification" for that approach.

Justice Douglas's approach was adopted in Griswold v. Connecticut, and appeared in other cases such as Lombard v. Louisiana, Bell v. Maryland, and Doe v. Bolton. Privacy was likewise centered for Fourth Amendment purposes in Katz v. United States and Stanley v. Georgia. Following Douglas's retirement, the Supreme Court adopted a more restrained approach towards individual rights guarantees under the Burger Court and Rehnquist Court.

Douglas's preferred approach to incorporation—treating the dissent in Adamson v. California as definitive on the issue of the Bill of Rights—would largely be overlooked by the Supreme Court until Justice Thomas's opinion in McDonald v. City of Chicago.

== See also ==
- List of United States Supreme Court cases, volume 367
