= C. Lee Buxton =

American gynecologist and professor

- Born: Charles Lee Buxton; October 14, 1904; Superior, Wisconsin
- Died: July 7, 1969 (aged 64); Hamden, Connecticut
- Occupation(s): gynecologist, professor
- Known for: Birth control advocacy, Griswold v. Connecticut

Charles Lee Buxton (October 14, 1904 – July 7, 1969) was an American gynecologist, professor at the Yale School of Medicine, and appellant in US Supreme Court case Griswold v. Connecticut. He is best known as a birth control advocate and, along with Estelle Griswold, party to several legal cases that ultimately repealed Connecticut's Comstock laws and established a Constitutional right to privacy for married couples.

== Biography ==
Buxton was born in Superior, Wisconsin, in 1904 to Edward Timothy Buxton, a lumber trader, and Lucinda Lee Buxton. He grew up in St. Paul, Minnesota, then attended Princeton University. Buxton graduated with an M.D. from the Columbia University College of Physicians and Surgeons in 1932. A specialist in female infertility, he joined the Columbia faculty in 1938. He became full professor in 1951, but moved to the Yale School of Medicine in 1953 when offered a position as chair of its Department of Obstetrics & Gynecology. At Yale, he was a fellow of Jonathan Edwards College.

Buxton and his wife, Helen Rotch, had four children.

== Contraception activism ==
Upon moving his infertility practice to New Haven, Buxton discovered he would be unable to prescribe or supply contraceptives to his patients because of Connecticut's anti-contraception Comstock law of 1879, which had been enforced for the first time in 1940. The prohibition extended to his patients whose lives were threatened by pregnancy and those who had experienced serial miscarriages, cases which stirred Buxton to action, and later formed the basis of a legal challenge. He began working with Estelle Griswold of the Planned Parenthood League of Connecticut in 1955 on their legislative challenge of Connecticut's anti-contraception law, and in 1957 testified in Connecticut state legislature for a doctors' exception to the ban. In the absence of legislative progress, Griswold and Buxton decided to mount a judicial challenge. Supported by Yale Law School professor Fowler Harper and lawyer Katie Roraback, they filed five cases on behalf of Buxton and four anonymous patients: Buxton v. Ullman, Hoe v. Ullman, Roe v. Hullman, Doe v. Ullman, and Poe v. Ullman. The Connecticut Supreme Court upheld the ban on contraception. On appeal, Buxton v. Ullman and Poe v. Ullman, filed for a patient who had experienced three stillbirths, were accepted by the US Supreme Court in 1960. In June 1961, the cases were dismissed by the court in a 5–4 ruling on the grounds that the case was not ripe because the law had not been enforced on the plaintiffs.

Immediately after the case, Buxton notified the Yale School of Medicine and Grace–New Haven Hospital that his clinic would begin providing contraceptive advice to patients. In November 1961, Griswold announced the opening new New Haven Planned Parenthood headquarters building with a family planning clinic, with Buxton as its medical director. Griswold and Buxton were arrested by the New Haven Police nine days after the clinic opened. The resulting case against Buxton and Lee, The State of Connecticut v. Estelle T. Griswold and C. Lee Buxton, was affirmed by the Connecticut Supreme Court in April 1964, providing evidence that the case was ripe. The appeal, known as Griswold v. Connecticut, was heard by the US Supreme Court one year later and overturned in a 7–2 ruling, finding the original anti-contraception statute unconstitutional because it violated "the right to marital privacy."

Buxton's health began to fail towards the end of the appeal. In 1965, he took a leave of absence from Yale. He died on July 7, 1969, in Hamden, Connecticut.

== Bibliography ==
=== Books ===
- Buxton, C. Lee. (1949). Diagnosis and Therapy of Gynecological Endocrine Disorders
- Buxton, C. Lee; Southam, Anna Lenore Skow. (1958). Human Infertility
- Buxton, C. Lee. (1962). A Study of Psychophysical Methods for Relief of Childbirth Pain

=== Articles ===
- Buxton, C. Lee. (1940). "Pregnanediol Determination as An Aid in Clinical Diagnosis." American Journal of Obstetrics & Gynecology
- Buxton, C. Lee; Engle, E. T. (1950). "Timing of Ovulation." American Journal of Obstetrics & Gynecology
- Buxton, C. Lee. (1956). "Human Infertility." Gynecology & Obstetrics
- Southam, AL; Buxton, C. Lee (1957). "Factors Influencing Reproductive Potential." Fertility & Sterlity
- Buxton, C. Lee; Weinman, D; Johnson, Carl. (1958). "Epidemiology of Trichomonas Vaginalis Vaginitis: A Progress Report." Obstetrics & Gynecology
- Buxton, C. Lee; Hermann, W. (1961). "Induction of Ovulation in the Human with Human Gonadotropins: Preliminary Report." Obstetrical & Gynecological Survey
- Buxton, C. Lee; Mastrionni, L. (1962). "Surgical Treatment of Infertility." Obstetrics & Gynecology
