= Griswold v. Connecticut =

1965 U.S. Supreme Court case on contraception

- Supreme Court of the United States

Argued March 29–30, 1965 Decided June 7, 1965
- Full case name: Estelle T. Griswold and C. Lee Buxton v. Connecticut
- Citations: 381 U.S. 479 (more) 85 S. Ct. 1678; 14 L. Ed. 2d 510; 1965 U.S. LEXIS 2282
- Argument: Oral argument

Case history
- Prior: Defendants convicted, Circuit Court for the Sixth Circuit, 01-02-62; affirmed, Circuit Court, Appellate Division, 01-07-63; affirmed, 200 A.2d 479 (Conn. 1964); probable jurisdiction noted, 379 U.S. 926 (1964).
- Subsequent: None

Holding
- The Connecticut statute forbidding use of contraceptives violates the right of marital privacy which is within the penumbra of specific guarantees of the Bill of Rights. Connecticut Supreme Court reversed.

Court membership
- Chief Justice Earl Warren Associate Justices Hugo Black · William O. Douglas; Tom C. Clark · John M. Harlan II; William J. Brennan Jr. · Potter Stewart; Byron White · Arthur Goldberg

Case opinions
- Majority: Douglas, joined by Warren, Clark, Brennan, Goldberg
- Concurrence: Goldberg, joined by Warren, Brennan
- Concurrence: Harlan (in judgment)
- Concurrence: White (in judgment)
- Dissent: Black, joined by Stewart
- Dissent: Stewart, joined by Black

Laws applied
- U.S. Const. amends. I, III, IV, V, IX, XIV; Conn. Gen. Stat. §§ 53-32, 54-196 (rev. 1958)

Griswold v. Connecticut, 381 U.S. 479 (1965), is a landmark decision of the U.S. Supreme Court in which the Court ruled that the Constitution of the United States protects the liberty of married couples to use contraceptives without government restriction. The case involved a Connecticut law that prohibited the use of "any drug, medicinal article or instrument for the purpose of preventing conception". The court held that the statute was unconstitutional, and that its effect was "to deny disadvantaged citizens ... access to medical assistance and up-to-date information in respect to proper methods of birth control." By a vote of 7–2, the Supreme Court invalidated the law on the grounds that it violated the "right to marital privacy", establishing the basis for the right to privacy with respect to intimate practices. This and other cases view the right to privacy as "protected from governmental intrusion".

Although the U.S. Bill of Rights does not explicitly mention "privacy", Justice William O. Douglas wrote for the majority, "Would we allow the police to search the sacred precincts of marital bedrooms for telltale signs of the use of contraceptives? The very idea is repulsive to the notions of privacy surrounding the marriage relationship." Justice Arthur Goldberg wrote a concurring opinion to clarify that the Ninth Amendment to the United States Constitution shows the framers' view that there are fundamental rights beyond those enumerated in the Constitution. Justice John Marshall Harlan II wrote a concurring opinion arguing that privacy is protected by the Due Process Clause of the Fourteenth Amendment to the U.S. Constitution, while Justice Byron White argued that Connecticut's law failed the rational basis standard.

== Background ==
Griswold v. Connecticut originated as a prosecution under the General Statutes of Connecticut. Connecticut law made it illegal to use "any drug, medicinal article, or instrument for the purpose of preventing conception". Violators could be "fined not less than fifty dollars or imprisoned not less than sixty days nor more than one year or be both fined and imprisoned".

In the late 19th and early 20th century, physicians in the United States largely avoided the publication of any material related to birth control, even when they often recommended or at least gave advice regarding it to their married patients. Then in 1914, Margaret Sanger openly challenged the public consensus against contraception. She influenced the Connecticut Birth Control League (CBCL) and helped to develop the eventual concept of the Planned Parenthood clinics.

The first Planned Parenthood clinic in Connecticut opened in 1935 in Hartford. It provided services to women who had no access to a gynecologist, including information about artificial contraception and other methods to plan the growth of their families. Several clinics were opened in Connecticut over the following years, including the Waterbury clinic that led to the legal dispute. In 1939, this clinic was compelled to enforce the 1879 anti-contraception law. This caught the attention of the CBCL leaders, who remarked on the importance of birth control for cases in which the lives of the patients depended upon it.

During the 1940s, two cases arose from the provision of contraception by the Waterbury clinic, leading to legal challenges to the constitutionality of Connecticut statutes that banned the use of contraceptives, but these failed on technical grounds. In Tileston v. Ullman (1943), a doctor and mother challenged the law on the grounds that a ban on contraception could, in certain sexual situations, threaten the lives and well-being of patients. The U.S. Supreme Court dismissed the appeal on the grounds that the plaintiff lacked standing to sue on behalf of his patients. Yale School of Medicine gynecologist C. Lee Buxton and his patients brought a second challenge to the law in Poe v. Ullman (1961). The Supreme Court again dismissed the appeal, on the grounds that the case was not ripe: the plaintiffs had not been charged or threatened with prosecution, so there was no actual controversy for the Court to resolve.

The polemic around Poe led to the appeal in Griswold v. Connecticut, primarily based on the dissent of Justice John Marshall Harlan II in Poe, one of the most cited dissents in Supreme Court history.

[T]he full scope of the liberty guaranteed by the Due Process Clause cannot be found in or limited by the precise terms of the specific guarantees elsewhere provided in the Constitution. This "liberty" is not a series of isolated points pricked out in terms of the taking of property; the freedom of speech, press, and religion; the right to keep and bear arms; the freedom from unreasonable searches and seizures; and so on. It is a rational continuum which, broadly speaking, includes a freedom from all substantial arbitrary impositions and purposeless restraints.

— Justice John Marshall Harlan II, dissent in Poe v. Ullman.

He argued, foremost, that the Supreme Court should have heard the case rather than dismissing it. Thereafter, he indicated his support for a broad interpretation of the Due Process Clause. On the basis of this interpretation, Harlan concluded that the Connecticut statute violated the Constitution.

After Poe was handed down in June 1961, the Planned Parenthood League of Connecticut (PPLC) decided to challenge the law again. Estelle Griswold served on the PPLC as executive director from 1954 to 1965. Struggling through legal battles against birth control restrictions in Connecticut, Griswold and PPLC made an initial effort to financially support women who wanted contraceptives to bus to cities in New York and Rhode Island. Griswold and Dr. Buxton (PPLC medical volunteer), opened a birth control clinic in New Haven, Connecticut, "thus directly challeng[ing] the state law". The clinic opened on November 1, 1961, and that same day received its first ten patients and dozens of appointment requests from married women who wanted birth control advice and prescriptions. Less than two days after the fact, police officers arrived, to which Griswold explained in detail both the operations of the clinic and openly admitted to breaking state law. A week later, the detectives arrived with arrest warrants. Griswold and Buxton were arrested, tried in a one-day bench trial, found guilty, and fined $100 each. The conviction was upheld by the Appellate Division of the Circuit Court, and by the Connecticut Supreme Court.

== Supreme Court decision ==
On June 7, 1965, the Supreme Court issued a 7–2 decision in favor of Griswold that struck down Connecticut's state law against contraceptives.

=== Opinion of the Court ===
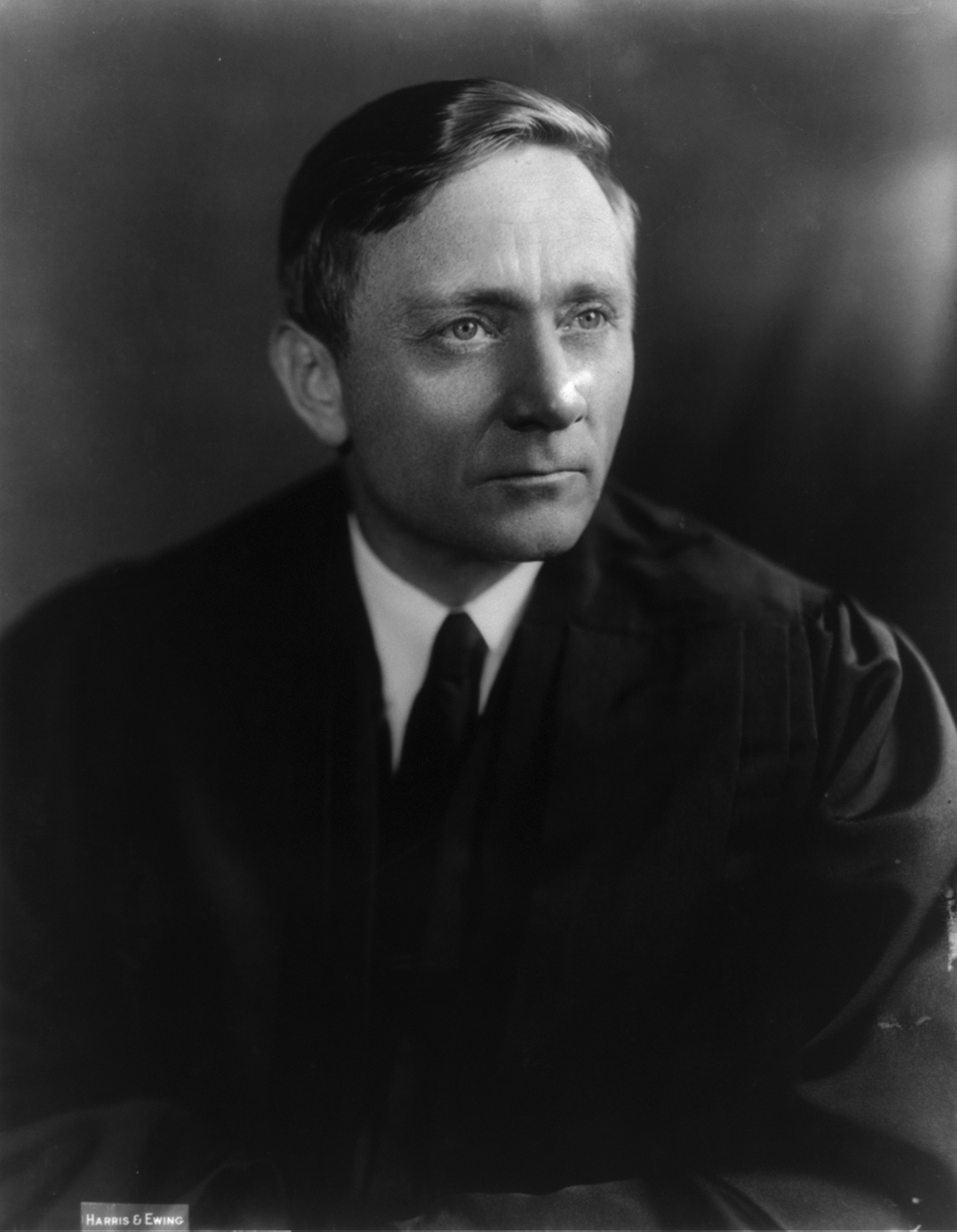
Justice William O. Douglas, the author of the majority opinion in Griswold

Seven justices formed the majority and joined an opinion written by Justice William O. Douglas. The Court held that the U.S. Constitution protects "marital privacy" as a fundamental constitutional right, but it rejected the notion it needed to identify only a singular source for the right in the Constitution's text. The Court rejected the Due Process Clause of the Fifth and Fourteenth Amendments to the U.S. Constitution as the source of the marital privacy right, because at the time the Court still formally rejected the doctrine of substantive due process due to its association with the 1905 decision Lochner v. New York, and with economic problems, business affairs and social conditions rather than the intimate relationships of married persons and their physicians.

Instead of trying to justify the right to marital privacy under substantive due process, the Court said that the marital relationship is one "lying within the zone of privacy governed by several fundamental constitutional guarantees" and the opinion discusses various landmark cases where specific parts of the bill of rights have been held to cover areas that are not necessary included in the text of their own specific provisions within the Bill of Rights, such as how the right of association is deemed covered by the First, and other examples noted involved the Third, Fourth, and Fifth Amendments. It referenced earlier cases where the Court had found personal liberties that were constitutionally protected despite not being specifically enumerated in the Constitution, such as the constitutional right to parental control over childrearing found in the early 20th century cases Meyer v. Nebraska (1923) and Pierce v. Society of Sisters (1925). The Court viewed marital privacy right's implicit nature to be similar, and in a now well-known line Douglas used the metaphor of shined light and its shadows to describe it.

The foregoing cases suggest that specific guarantees in the Bill of Rights have penumbras, formed by emanations from those guarantees that help give them life and substance. Various guarantees create zones of privacy.... We have had many controversies over these penumbral rights of "privacy and repose." These cases bear witness that the right of privacy which presses for recognition here is a legitimate one.

— Griswold v. Connecticut, 381 U.S. at 484–85 (case citations omitted).

Reasoning that the provisions of the Bill of Rights created "emanations" of protection that created "penumbras" within which rights could still be covered even if not explicitly enumerated in the Constitution, Douglas wrote that the right to marital privacy fell within this protection. The Court concluded that Connecticut's anti-contraception law violated this right to privacy, and therefore was unconstitutional. Douglas reasoned that the right to marital privacy was "older than the Bill of Rights", and ended the opinion with an impassioned appeal to the sanctity of marriage in the Anglo-American culture and common law tradition.

Would we allow the police to search the sacred precincts of marital bedrooms for telltale signs of the use of contraceptives? The very idea is repulsive to the notions of privacy surrounding the marriage relationship.

We deal with a right of privacy older than the Bill of Rights — older than our political parties, older than our school system. Marriage is a coming together for better or for worse, hopefully enduring, and intimate to the degree of being sacred. It is an association that promotes a way of life, not causes; a harmony in living, not political faiths; a bilateral loyalty, not commercial or social projects. Yet it is an association for as noble a purpose as any involved in our prior decisions.

— Griswold, 381 U.S. at 485–86.

=== Concurrences ===
Justice Arthur Goldberg concurred with the Court and wrote a separate opinion to emphasize his view that the Ninth Amendment—which states that if the Constitution enumerates certain rights but does not enumerate others it does not mean that the other rights do not exist—was sufficient authority on its own to support the Court's finding of a fundamental constitutional right to marital privacy. Justice John Marshall Harlan II also concurred with the Court, and wrote a concurring opinion arguing that the right to privacy should be protected under the Due Process Clause of the Fourteenth Amendment. Justice Byron White concurred only in the judgment, and wrote an opinion describing how he thought Connecticut's law failed rational basis scrutiny, saying: "I wholly fail to see how the ban on the use of contraceptives by married couples in any way reinforces the State's ban on illicit sexual relationships."

=== Dissents ===
Justices Hugo Black and Potter Stewart dissented from the Court's decision. Both justices' dissents argued that because the U.S. Constitution does not expressly mention privacy in any of its provisions, the Court had no basis to strike down Connecticut's anti-contraception law. Black's dissent concluded: "I get nowhere in this case by talk about a constitutional 'right of privacy' as an emanation from one or more constitutional provisions. I like my privacy as well as the next one, but I am nevertheless compelled to admit that government has a right to invade it unless prohibited by some specific constitutional provision."

== Precedent for later cases ==
Later decisions by the U.S. Supreme Court extended the principles of Griswold beyond its particular facts.

=== Right to birth control for unmarried couples, 1972 ===
Eisenstadt v. Baird (1972) extended Griswold's holding to unmarried couples. The argument in Eisenstadt was that it was a violation of the Equal Protection Clause of the Fourteenth Amendment to deny unmarried couples the right to use contraception when married couples did have that right (under Griswold). Writing for the majority, Justice Brennan wrote that Massachusetts could not enforce the law against married couples because of Griswold v. Connecticut, so the law worked "irrational discrimination" if not extended to unmarried couples as well.

=== Right to abortion for any woman, 1973 ===
The reasoning and language of both Griswold and Eisenstadt were cited in the concurring opinion by Associate Justice Potter Stewart in support of Roe v. Wade, 410 U.S. 113 (1973). The decision in Roe struck down a Texas law that criminalized aiding a woman in getting an abortion. The Court ruled that this law was a violation of the Due Process Clause of the Fourteenth Amendment. Abortion became legalized for any woman for any reason, up through the first trimester, with possible restrictions for maternal health in the second trimester (the midpoint of which is the approximate time of fetal viability). In the third trimester of pregnancy, abortion is potentially illegal with exception for the mother's health, which the court defined broadly in Doe v. Bolton. On June 24, 2022, Dobbs v. Jackson overturned Roe, reversing the application of the Due Process Clause in the case of abortion and returning its regulation to state control under the Tenth Amendment.

=== Right to contraception for juveniles at least 16 years of age, 1977 ===
In Carey v. Population Services International (1977) the U.S. Supreme Court held that it was unconstitutional to prohibit anyone other than a licensed pharmacist to distribute nonprescription contraceptives to persons 16 years of age or over, to prohibit the distribution of nonprescription contraceptives by any adult to minors under 16 years of age, and to prohibit anyone, including licensed pharmacists, to advertise or display contraceptives. The Court also held that the Due Process Clause of the Fourteenth Amendment to the United States Constitution does not allow a state to intrude on an individual's decisions on matters of procreation which is protected as privacy rights.

=== Right to privacy in private sexual activity, 2003 ===
Lawrence v. Texas (2003) struck down a Texas sodomy law that prohibited certain forms of intimate sexual contact between members of the same sex. Without stating a standard of review in the majority opinion, the court overruled Bowers v. Hardwick (1986), declaring that the "Texas statute furthers no legitimate state interest which can justify its intrusion into the personal and private life of the individual." Justice O'Connor, who wrote a concurring opinion, framed it as an issue of rational basis review. Justice Kennedy's majority opinion, based on the liberty interest protected by the Due Process Clause of the Fourteenth Amendment, stated that the Texas anti-sodomy statute touched "upon the most private human conduct, sexual behavior, and in the most private of places, the home", and attempted to "control a personal relationship that ... is within the liberty of persons to choose without being punished". Thus, the Court held that adults are entitled to participate in private, consensual sexual conduct. While the opinion in Lawrence was framed in terms of the right to liberty, Kennedy described the "right to privacy" found in Griswold as the "most pertinent beginning point" in the evolution of the concepts embodied in Lawrence.

=== Right to same-sex marriage, 2015 ===
Griswold was also cited in a chain of cases that led the Supreme Court to legalize same-sex marriage in another landmark case, Obergefell v. Hodges.

=== Right to abortion overturned, 2022 ===
On June 24, 2022, the majority opinion in Dobbs v. Jackson Women's Health Organization written by Justice Samuel Alito limited the right to privacy to exclude the right to an abortion. In Justice Clarence Thomas's concurrence, he argued, "In future cases, we should reconsider all of this Court's substantive due process precedents, including Griswold, Lawrence, and Obergefell, ... Because any substantive due process decision is 'demonstrably erroneous' ... we have a duty to 'correct the error' established in those precedents," referring to decisions on contraception, sodomy, and same-sex marriage as future cases for the Supreme Court to reverse. Broadly, Justice Thomas does not believe in substantive due process and has referred to it as 'legal fiction'. In regards to unenumerated rights, the majority opinion also said, "The abortion right is also critically different from any other right that this Court has held to fall within the Fourteenth Amendment's protection of 'liberty'."

The dissenting opinion criticized the majority for overturning precedents dating back to Griswold, and argued, "And no one should be confident that this majority is done with its work. The right Roe and Casey recognized does not stand alone. To the contrary, the Court has linked it for decades to other settled freedoms involving bodily integrity, familial relationships, and procreation. Most obviously, the right to terminate a pregnancy arose straight out of the right to purchase and use contraception. In turn, those rights led, more recently, to rights of same-sex intimacy and marriage. They are all part of the same constitutional fabric, protecting autonomous decisionmaking over the most personal of life decisions ... So one of two things must be true. Either the majority does not really believe in its own reasoning. Or if it does, all rights that have no history stretching back to the mid-19th century are insecure. Either the mass of the majority's opinion is hypocrisy, or additional constitutional rights are under threat. It is one or the other."

== See also ==
- Bill Baird (activist)
- Birth control movement in the United States
- Catherine Roraback
- List of sex-related court cases in the United States
- List of United States Supreme Court cases, volume 381
- Meyer v. Nebraska
- NAACP v. Alabama
- Margaret Sanger
- McGee v. The Attorney General
