= Rehnquist Court =

Period of the US Supreme Court from 1986 to 2005

Supreme Court of the United States
Rehnquist Court
- Burger Court ← → Roberts Court
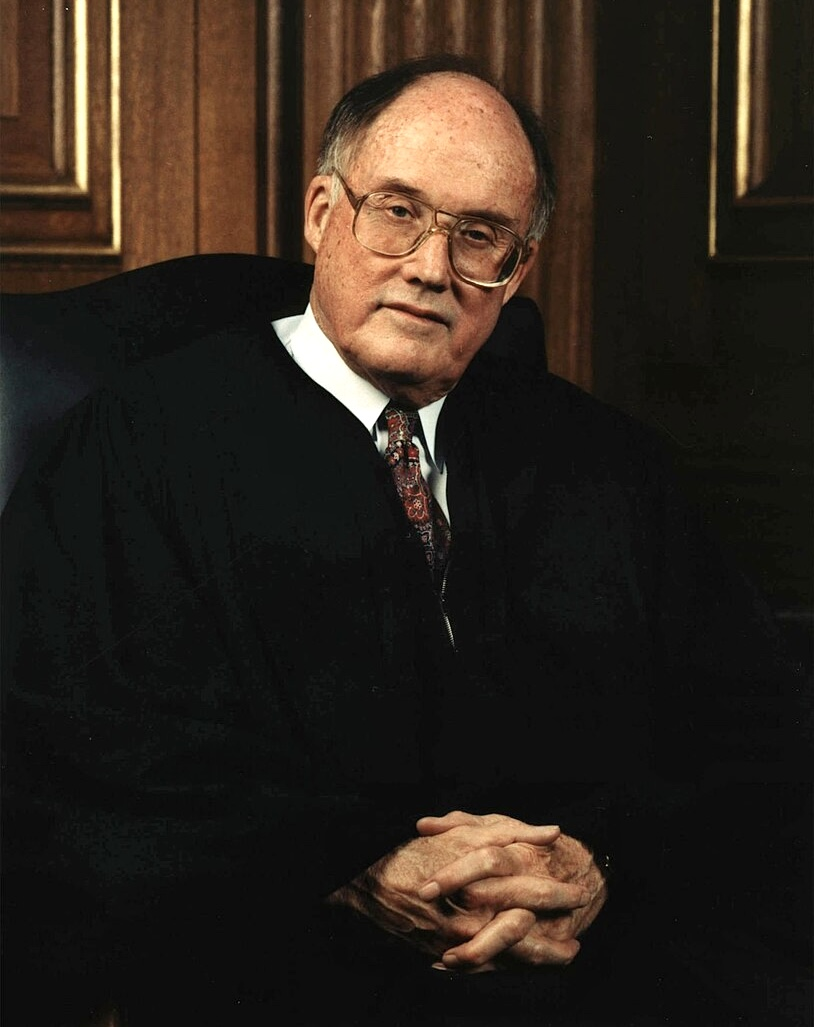
- Chief Justice William Rehnquist
- September 26, 1986 – September 3, 2005 (18 years, 342 days)
- Seat: Supreme Court Building; Washington, D.C.
- No. of positions: 9
- Rehnquist Court decisions

The Rehnquist Court was the period in the history of the Supreme Court of the United States during which William Rehnquist served as Chief Justice. Rehnquist succeeded Warren E. Burger as Chief Justice after the latter's retirement, and Rehnquist held this position until his death in 2005, at which point John Roberts was nominated and confirmed as Rehnquist's replacement. The Rehnquist Court is generally considered to be more conservative than the preceding Burger Court, but not as conservative as the succeeding Roberts Court. According to Jeffrey Rosen, Rehnquist combined an amiable nature with great organizational skill, and he "led a Court that put the brakes on some of the excesses of the Earl Warren era while keeping pace with the sentiments of a majority of the country."

Biographer John Jenkins argued that Rehnquist politicized the Supreme Court and moved the court and the country to the right. Through its rulings, the Rehnquist Court often promoted a policy of New Federalism in which more power was given to the states at the expense of the federal government. The Rehnquist Court was also notable for its stability, as the same nine justices served together for 11 years from 1994 to 2005, the longest such stretch in Supreme Court history.

== Membership ==
Rehnquist joined the Court in 1972 after Richard Nixon appointed him as an associate justice, and Rehnquist remained in that position until Ronald Reagan elevated him to the position of Chief Justice in 1986, when Warren E. Burger retired. Rehnquist's vacant Associate Justice seat was filled by Antonin Scalia. The Rehnquist Court thus began on September 26, 1986, with Scalia and the remaining eight members of the Burger Court: Rehnquist, William J. Brennan Jr., Byron White, Thurgood Marshall, Harry Blackmun, Lewis F. Powell Jr., John Paul Stevens, and Sandra Day O'Connor.

Powell retired in 1987; President Reagan's nomination of Robert Bork was defeated by the Senate, and his second nominee, Douglas H. Ginsburg, withdrew before a vote. Reagan's third nominee, Anthony Kennedy, was confirmed by the Senate. Brennan retired in 1990 and Marshall in 1991, giving President George H. W. Bush the opportunity to appoint Justices David Souter and Clarence Thomas. White retired in 1993 and Blackmun retired in 1994, and President Bill Clinton appointed Justices Ruth Bader Ginsburg and Stephen Breyer to replace White and Blackmun respectively.

The composition of the Supreme Court remained unchanged for the balance of the Rehnquist Court, which ended when Rehnquist died on September 3, 2005. He was succeeded by the current Chief Justice, John Roberts, who was appointed to the position by George W. Bush.

=== Timeline ===
Bar key:
Eisenhower appointee Kennedy appointee L. Johnson appointee Nixon appointee Ford appointee Reagan appointee G. H. W. Bush appointee Clinton appointee

Note: William Rehnquist is listed as a Reagan appointee due to his elevation to the position of Chief Justice by Reagan in 1986, but he was initially appointed to the Court by Nixon.

== Other branches ==
Presidents during this court included Ronald Reagan, George H. W. Bush, Bill Clinton, and George W. Bush. Congresses during this court included the 99th through the 109th United States Congresses.

== Rulings of the Court ==
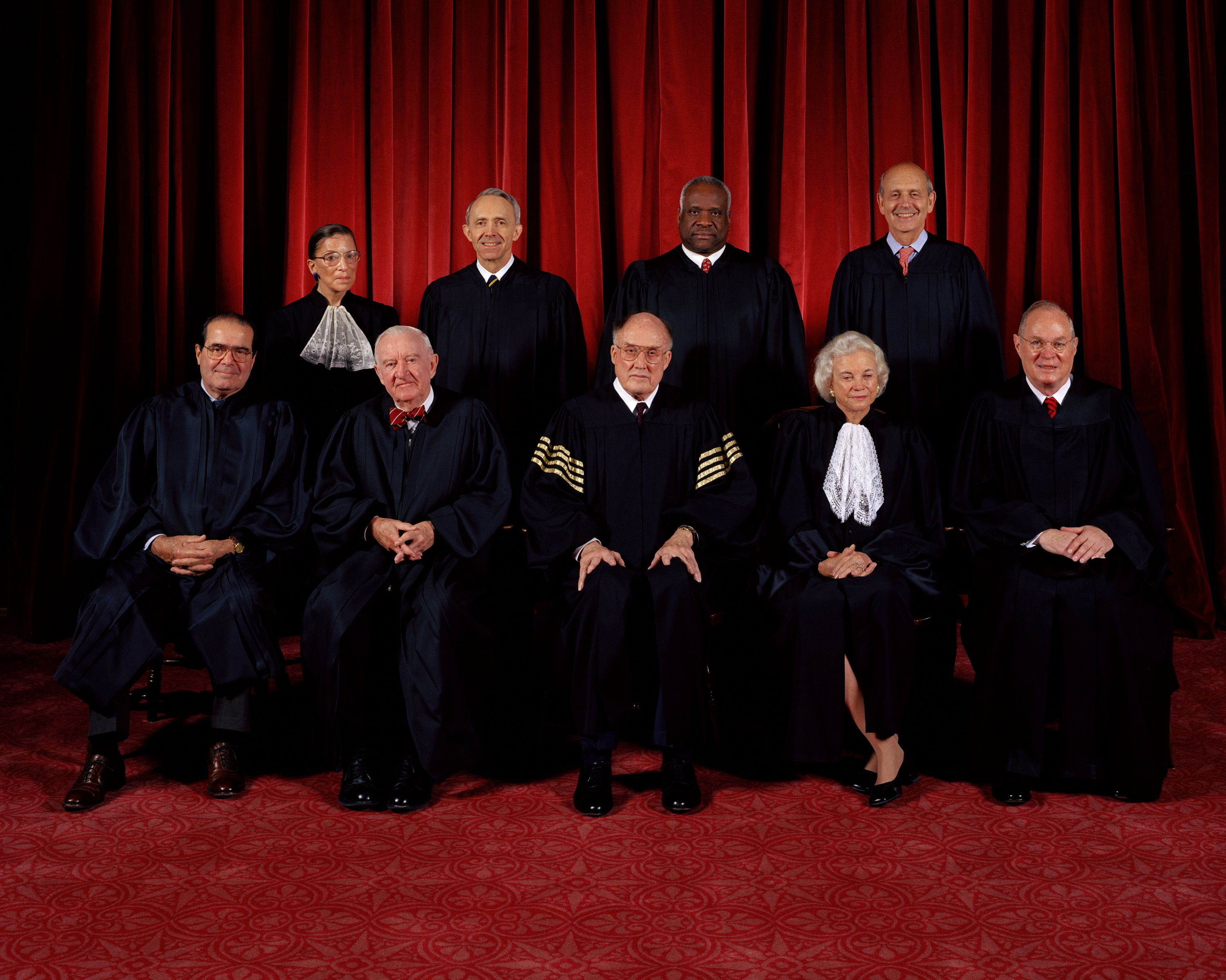
The Rehnquist Court in 2003

The Rehnquist Court issued several notable rulings touching on many aspects of American life. Landmark cases of the Rehnquist Court include:

- Texas v. Johnson (1989): In a 5–4 decision written by Justice Brennan, the Court struck down a state law that prevented the burning of the American flag. The court held that the act of burning the flag is protected speech under the First Amendment. In a subsequent case, United States v. Eichman (1990), the court struck down a similar federal statute.
- Planned Parenthood v. Casey (1992): In a plurality opinion jointly written by Justices O'Connor, Kennedy, and Souter, the court upheld the constitutional right to have an abortion established in Roe v. Wade (1973). However, Casey replaced the strict scrutiny standard of judicial review set out in Roe with the less stringent undue burden standard, giving states more leeway in placing restrictions on abortion (e.g. states can require a 24-hour waiting period). Both Roe and Casey were later overturned by Dobbs v. Jackson Women's Health Organization (2022).
- United States v. Lopez (1995): In a 5–4 decision written by Justice Rehnquist, the court struck down the Gun-Free School Zones Act of 1990 as an unconstitutional extension of Congressional power. Notably, this case marked the first time since the advent of the New Deal that the court struck down a law based on the Commerce Clause. The law in question made it a federal crime to have a handgun near or in a school, and the Court held that possession of a handgun is not an economic activity and does not have a substantial effect on interstate commerce.
- United States v. Morrison (2000): In a 5–4 decision written by Justice Rehnquist, the court struck down portions of the Violence Against Women Act of 1994 as an unconstitutional extension of Congressional power. As in Lopez, the court ruled that Congress had attempted to stretch the Commerce Clause beyond its constitutional meaning, and it struck down the federal provision that allowed victims of gender-motivated violence to sue their attackers in federal court.
- Bush v. Gore (2000): In a per curiam decision in which four justices dissented, the Supreme Court overruled the Florida Supreme Court and halted a manual recount of the 2000 presidential election ballots cast in Florida. The court ruled that the recount violated the Equal Protection Clause as Florida lacked a statewide standard for recounting votes, and also ruled that no recount could possibly take place before the statutory "safe harbor" deadline. Without a recount, Republican George W. Bush won Florida's electoral votes and the presidency.
- Grutter v. Bollinger (2003): In a 5–4 decision written by Justice O'Connor, the court upheld the affirmative action admissions policy of the University of Michigan Law School on the grounds that the law school had a compelling interest in promoting class diversity. The court held that schools could use race as a factor in admissions, so long as the school did not use a quota system, which had been held to be unconstitutional in Regents of the University of California v. Bakke (1978). Grutter was effectively overturned by Students for Fair Admissions v. Harvard (2023).
- Lawrence v. Texas (2003): In a 6–3 decision in which Justice Kennedy wrote the majority opinion, the court invalidated several state sodomy laws. Lawrence overturned Bowers v. Hardwick, a 1986 case in which the court had held that state laws criminalizing gay sexual acts were constitutional. In overturning Bowers, the court ruled that intimate consensual sexual conduct was protected by substantive due process under the Fourteenth Amendment.
- McConnell v. FEC (2003): In a 5–4 decision written by Justices Stevens and O'Connor, the court upheld several provisions of the Bipartisan Campaign Reform Act of 2002, including its restrictions on "soft money." The court held that not all political speech is protected by the First Amendment, and that the government has a legitimate interest in preventing corruption and the appearance of corruption. The case was partially overturned by Citizens United v. FEC (2010).

== Judicial philosophy ==
Rehnquist had often been a lone conservative dissenter during the Burger Court, but the appointments of O'Connor, Scalia, Kennedy, and, perhaps most importantly, Thomas, moved the court to the right. Rehnquist favored returning power to the states at the expense of the federal government, and he was joined by the aforementioned justices in striking down federal laws, which the Rehnquist Court did more often than any previous court. These five justices formed a dominant conservative bloc, though Rehnquist was slightly less committed to ideological purity than Scalia or Thomas, and Justices Kennedy and O'Connor often served as swing votes who would side with the more liberal justices. O'Connor's prominence as a swing vote led some to call it the "O'Connor Court," and she wrote several important opinions. Justice Stevens, the most senior associate justice during much of the Rehnquist Court, led the liberal bloc, which also included Justices Souter, Ginsburg, and Breyer. Stevens was often successful in winning over either or both of O'Connor and Kennedy in order to stymie the agenda of the court's conservative bloc. Of the nine justices who served from 1994–2005, seven had been appointed by Republican presidents, and the relative liberalism of some of those justices (particularly Stevens and Souter, but also O'Connor and Kennedy to a lesser extent) frustrated many in the Republican Party.

== Gallery ==
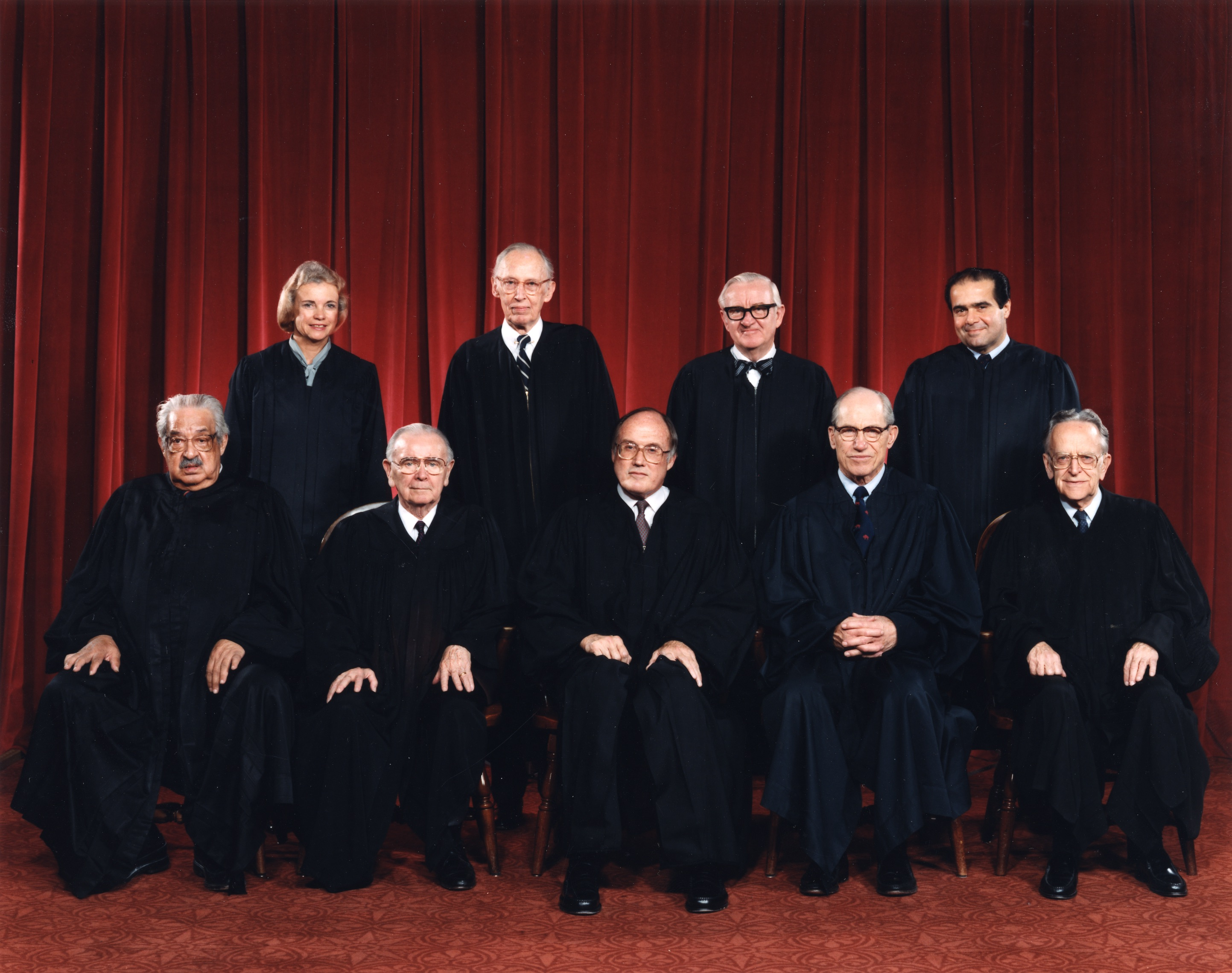
Rehnquist Court
(September 26, 1986 – June 26, 1987)

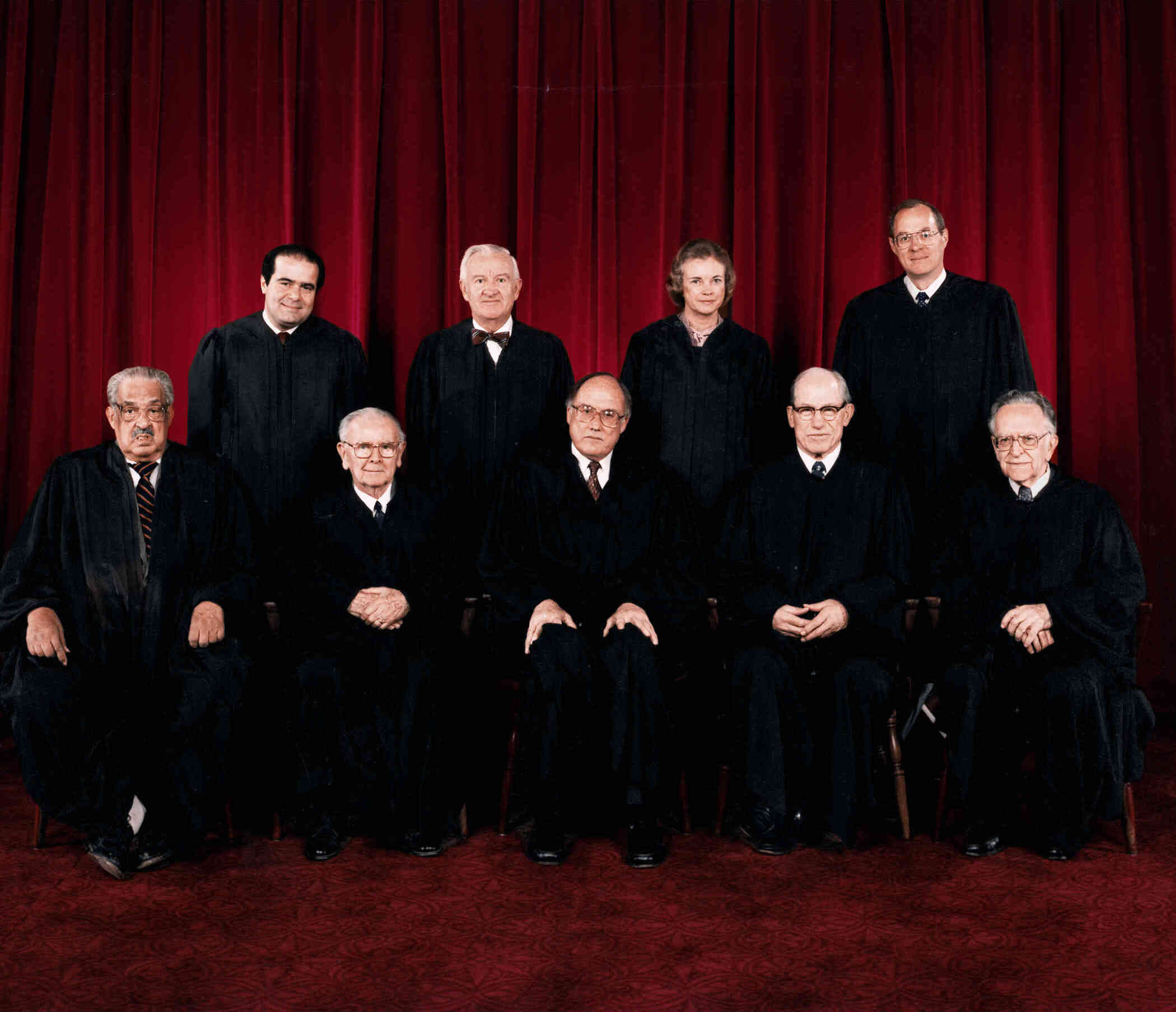
Rehnquist Court
(February 18, 1988 – July 20, 1990)

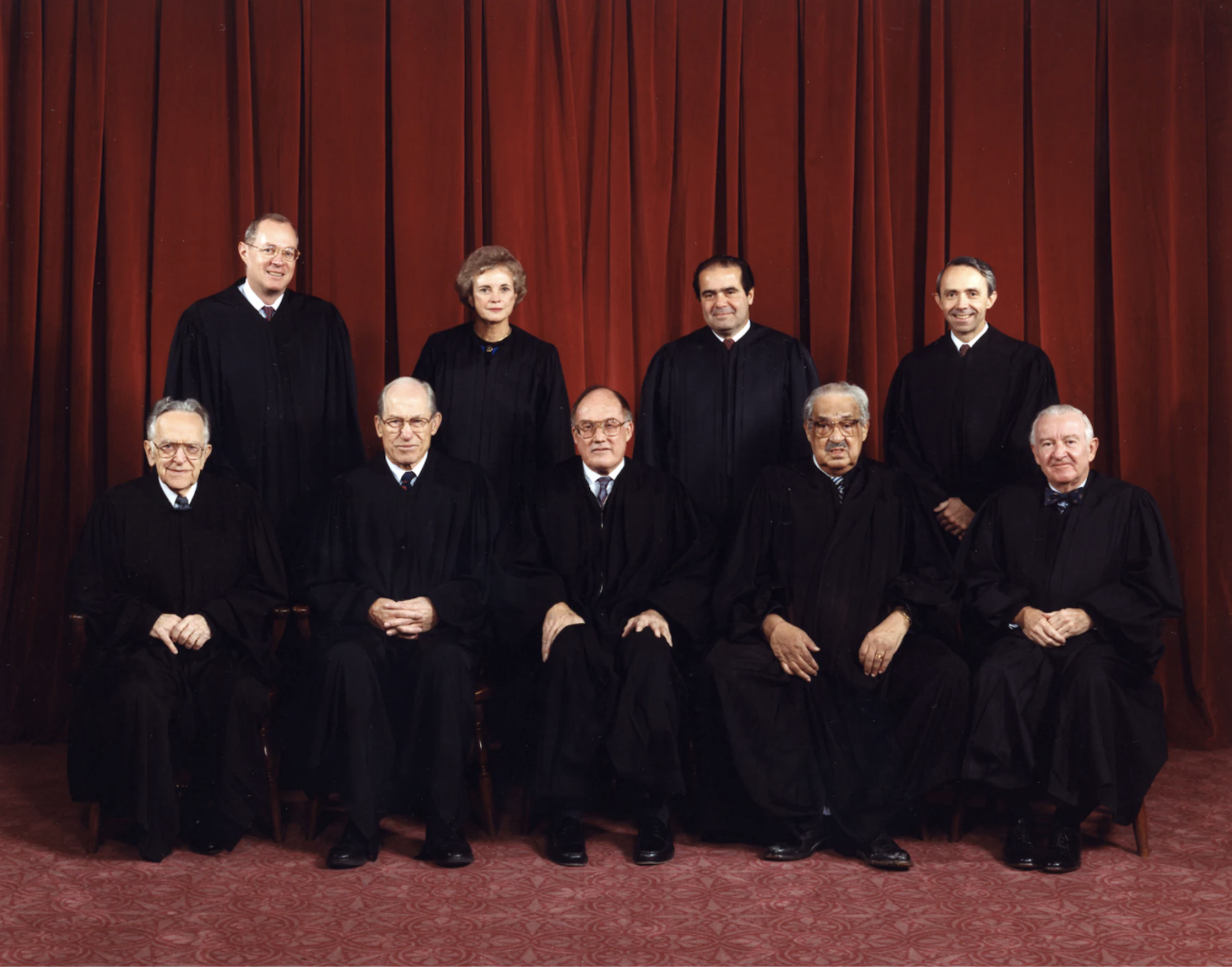
Rehnquist Court
(October 9, 1990 – October 1, 1991)

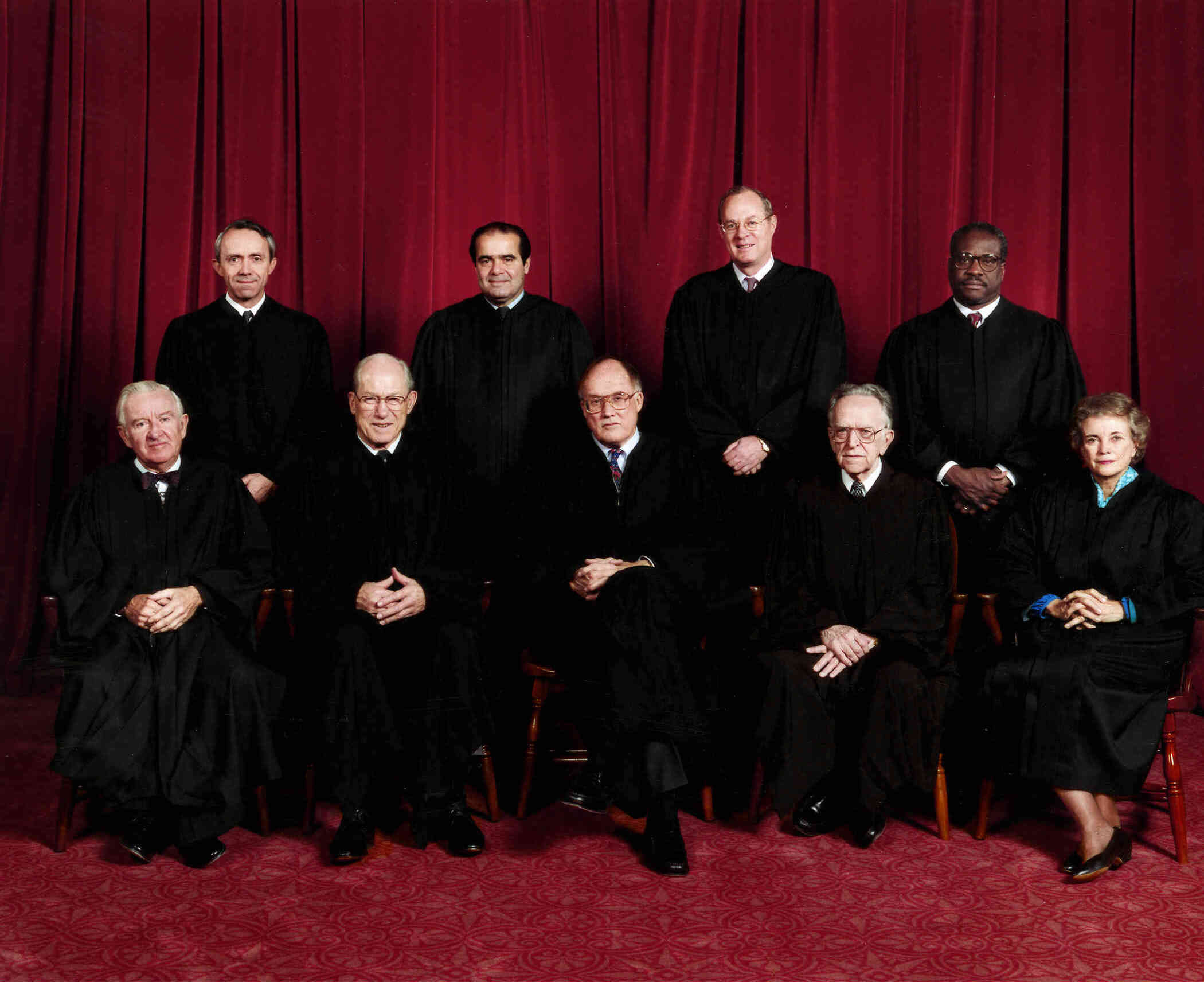
Rehnquist Court
(October 23, 1991 – June 28, 1993)

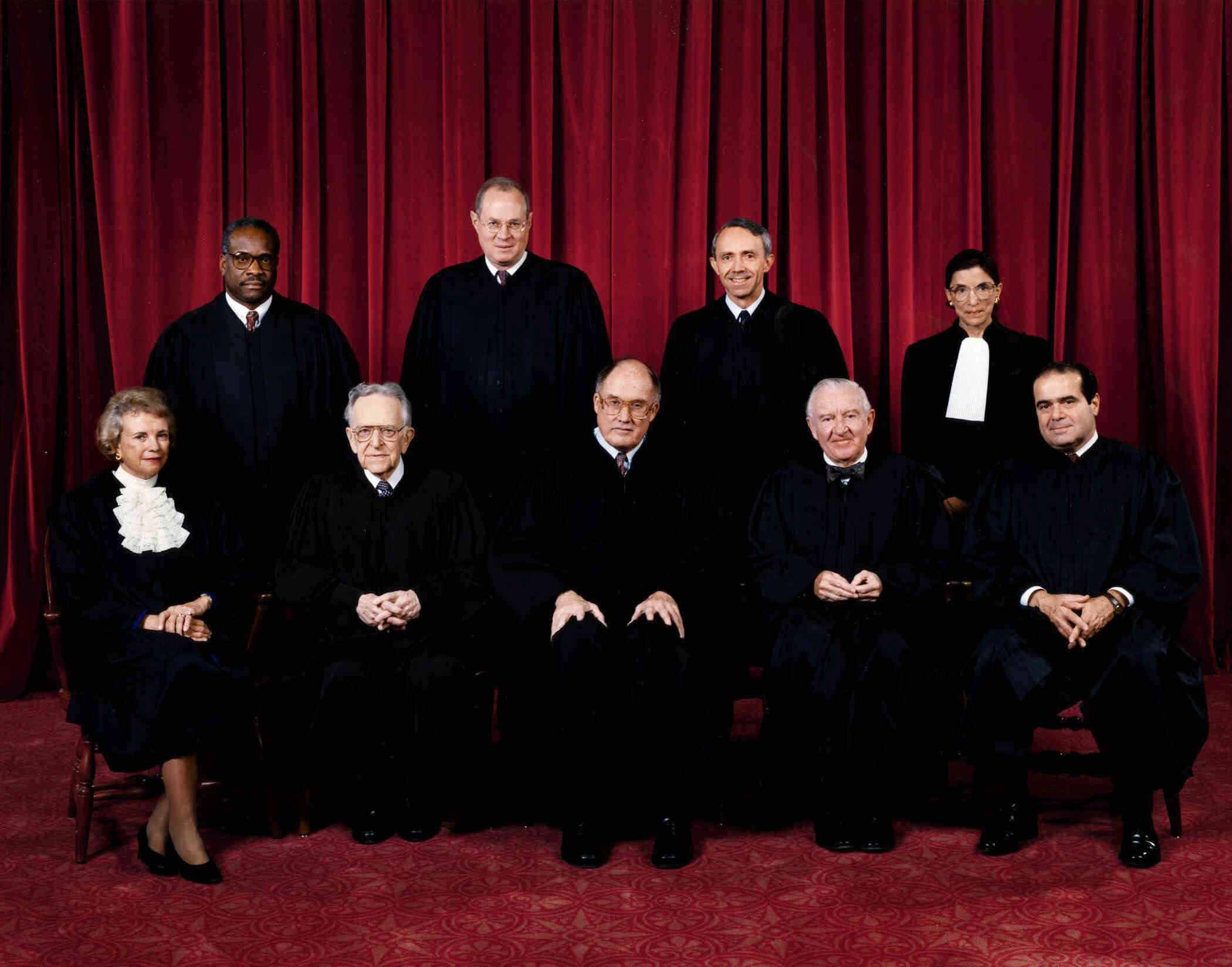
Rehnquist Court
(August 10, 1993 – August 3, 1994)

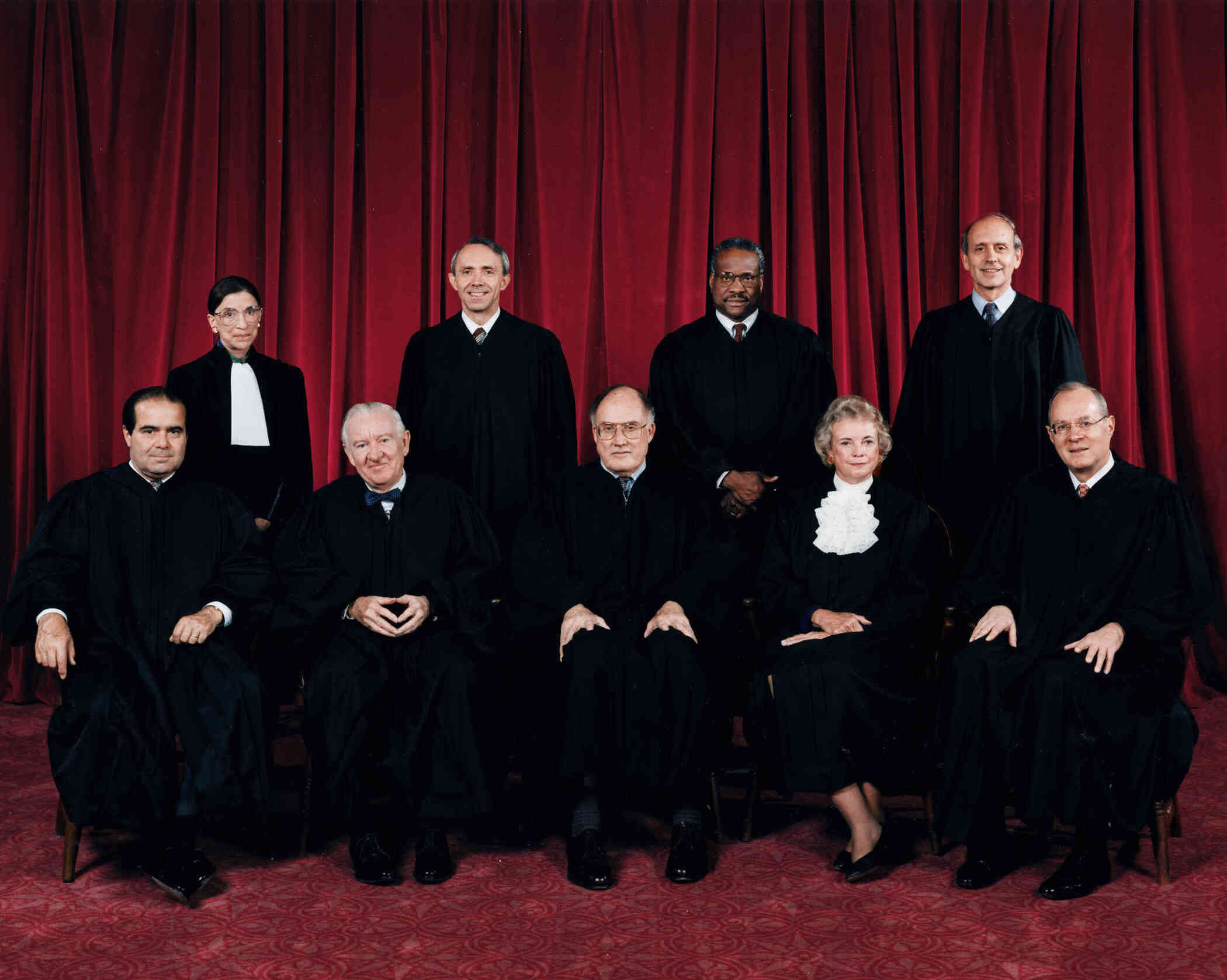
Rehnquist Court
(August 3, 1994 – September 3, 2005)
