= Burger Court =

Period of the US Supreme Court from 1969 to 1986

Supreme Court of the United States
Burger Court
- Warren Court ← → Rehnquist Court
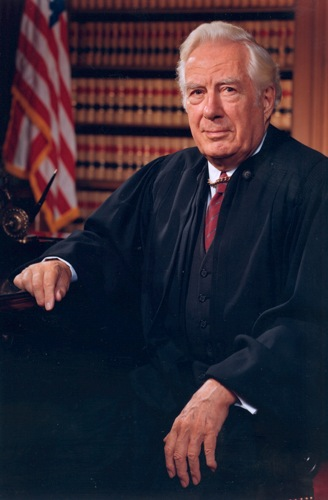
- Chief Justice Warren E. Burger
- June 23, 1969 – September 26, 1986 (17 years, 95 days)
- Seat: Supreme Court Building; Washington, D.C.
- No. of positions: 9
- Burger Court decisions

The Burger Court was the period in the history of the Supreme Court of the United States from 1969 to 1986, when Warren E. Burger served as Chief Justice of the United States. Burger succeeded Earl Warren as Chief Justice after Warren's retirement, and served as Chief Justice until his retirement, when William Rehnquist was nominated and confirmed as Burger's replacement. The Burger Court is generally considered to be the last liberal court to date. It has been described as a transitional court, due to its transition from having the liberal rulings of the Warren Court to the conservative rulings of the Rehnquist Court.

A symbol of the conservative "retrenchment" promised by President Richard Nixon in the 1968 election, Burger was often overshadowed by the liberal William J. Brennan, Jr. and the more conservative William Rehnquist. The Burger Court had a less generous interpretation of the protections offered by the Fourth Amendment and the Fifth Amendment than those of the Warren Court, but the Burger Court did not overrule any of the major precedents set by the Warren Court.

== Membership ==
In 1969, President Richard Nixon appointed Warren E. Burger as the replacement for the retiring Earl Warren. Warren had attempted to retire in 1968, but President Lyndon B. Johnson's nomination of Associate Justice Abe Fortas as Chief Justice was successfully filibustered by Senate Republicans. Fortas resigned from the court in 1969 following an ethics scandal, and Burger was easily confirmed the next month.

The Burger Court thus began on June 23, 1969, with Burger and seven veterans of the Warren Court: Hugo Black, William O. Douglas, John Marshall Harlan II, William J. Brennan Jr., Potter Stewart, Byron White, and Thurgood Marshall. Nixon attempted to fill Fortas's vacant seat, but Nixon's nominations of Clement Haynsworth and G. Harrold Carswell were both voted down by the Senate. Fortas's replacement, Harry Blackmun, was finally confirmed in 1970; the 391-day vacancy was the longest since the 1860s (this was eclipsed by the 419 days between the death of Antonin Scalia in February 2016 and the confirmation of Neil Gorsuch in April 2017).

Black and Harlan both died in 1971, and Nixon replaced them with Lewis F. Powell Jr. and William Rehnquist. Nixon considered Mildred Lillie for nomination, but according to former White House Counsel John Dean, Chief Justice Warren E. Burger was deeply opposed to the idea of a woman on the court at the time. Burger threatened to resign over the nomination, and Nixon chose to nominate Lewis Powell rather than Lillie.

In November 1975, Douglas retired after 36 years of service. He suffered a debilitating stroke on the last day of 1974 and was unable to return to the Court full-time. President Gerald Ford, who had led an impeachment inquiry against Douglas in 1970 when he was the House Republican Leader, appointed John Paul Stevens to replace him.

In July 1981, Stewart retired, and President Ronald Reagan appointed Sandra Day O'Connor to replace him. O'Connor was the first woman to serve on the Supreme Court.

The Burger Court ended on September 26, 1986, when Chief Justice Burger retired. He was succeeded as Chief Justice by William Rehnquist, who was elevated to the position of Chief Justice by President Reagan. Rehnquist's Associate Justice seat was filled by Antonin Scalia.

=== Timeline ===
Bar key:
F. Roosevelt appointee Eisenhower appointee Kennedy appointee L. Johnson appointee Nixon appointee Ford appointee Reagan appointee

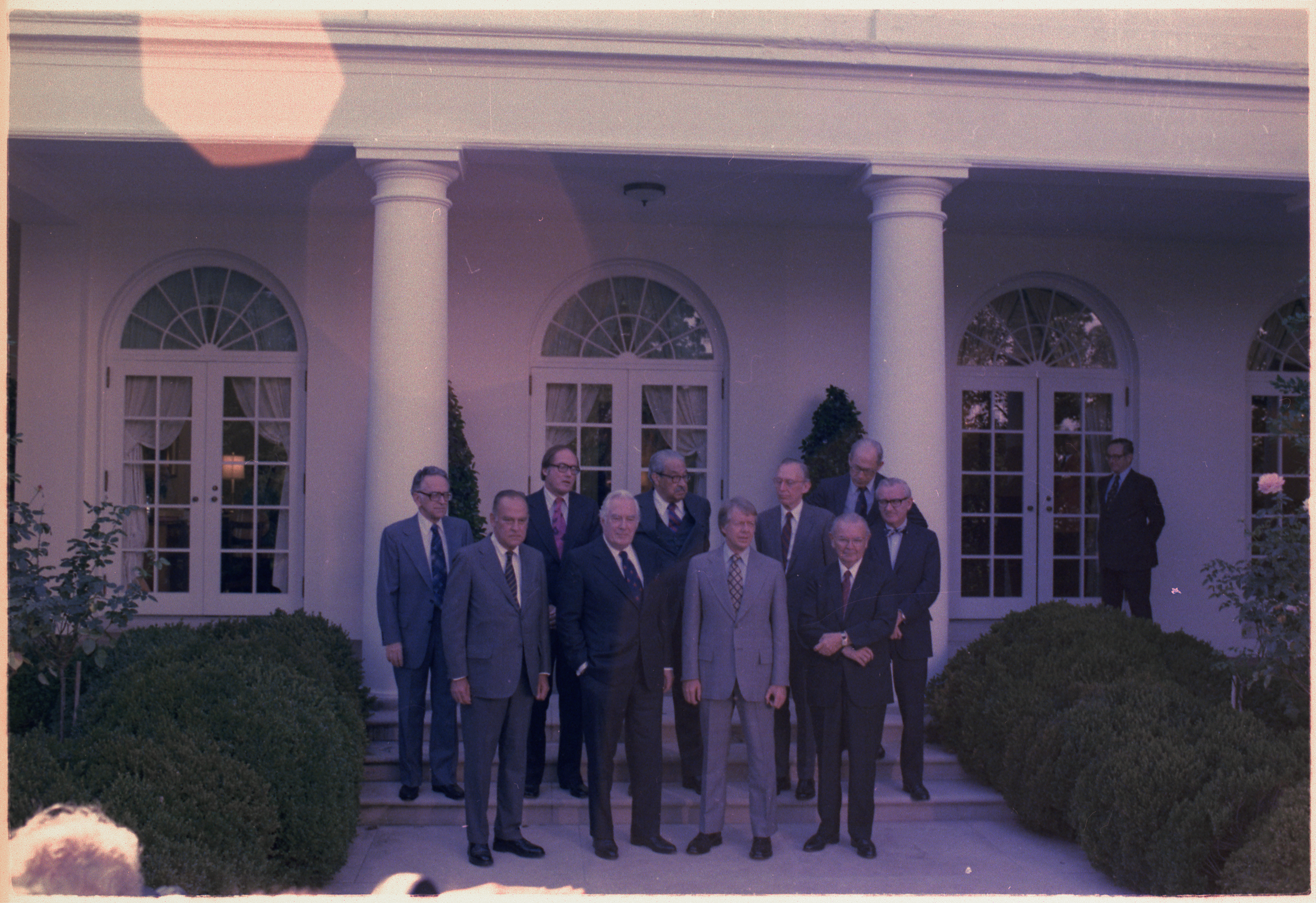
With Carter in 1977

== Other branches ==
Presidents during this court included Richard Nixon, Gerald Ford, Jimmy Carter, and Ronald Reagan. Congresses during this court included 91st through the 99th United States Congresses.

== Rulings of the Court ==
The Burger Court issued several notable rulings touching on many aspects of American life. Landmark cases of the Burger Court include:

- Lemon v. Kurtzman (1971): In an 8–1 decision written by Chief Justice Burger, the Court struck down a state law that allowed school superintendents to reimburse Catholic schools for the salaries of teachers. The court held that this violated the Establishment Clause, and the court created the Lemon test to determine whether a law is constitutional under the Establishment Clause.
- New York Times v. United States (1971): In a 6–3, per curiam decision, the court allowed The New York Times and The Washington Post to publish the Pentagon Papers. In so doing, the court placed the concept of freedom of the press above the Nixon Administration's claimed need to keep the papers secret for national security purposes.
- Roe v. Wade (1973): In a 7–2 decision written by Justice Blackmun, the court held that the right to privacy under the Due Process Clause extended to a woman's decision to have an abortion. The opinion struck down several state restrictions on abortion, and the opinion sparked an ongoing debate regarding abortion. Roe was eventually overturned by Dobbs v. Jackson Women's Health Organization (2022).
- Miller v. California (1973): In a 5–4 decision written by Chief Justice Burger, the court laid out the Miller test, which the court continues to use as a definition for obscene material. The court held that First Amendment protections extend only to non-obscene material.
- United States v. Nixon (1974): In an 8–0 decision written by Chief Justice Burger, the court rejected President Nixon's claim that executive privilege protected all communications between Nixon and his advisers. The ruling was important to the Watergate scandal, and Nixon resigned weeks after the decision was delivered.
- Milliken v. Bradley (1974): In a 5–4 decision, the court determined that school desegregation mandates need only be applied to schools within a single district and not to schools across different districts, unless it could be proven that district lines had been drawn with racist intent. The decision enabled de facto segregation by white flight from urban to suburban school districts.
- Gregg v. Georgia (1976): In a 7–2 decision written by Justice Stewart, the court held that the death penalty did not always qualify as cruel and unusual punishment, which is barred by the Eighth Amendment. The court required that the death penalty only be applied in extreme circumstances, and that any death penalty sentence be subject to appellate review.
- Regents of the University of California v. Bakke (1978): No single opinion was able to win a majority of the court's vote in this case. Nonetheless, Bakke upheld the usage of affirmative action in college admissions while disallowing the use of racial quotas.
- Bob Jones University v. United States (1983): In an 8–1 decision written by Chief Justice Burger, the court allowed the Internal Revenue Service to remove the non-profit classification of Bob Jones University due to the university's policy of racial discrimination. In doing so, the court held that IRS could deny non-profit status on the basis of compelling government interests.
- Bowers v. Hardwick (1986): In a 5–4 decision written by Justice Byron White, the court upheld the constitutionality of a Georgia sodomy law criminalizing oral and anal sex in private between consenting adults (particularly gay sex). The ruling was overturned in 2003 by Lawrence v. Texas.

== Judicial philosophy ==
Although Presidents Nixon, Ford, and Reagan all criticized the rulings of the Warren Court and sought to appoint conservative justices, the legacy of the Warren Court remained strong throughout the 1970s. The Burger Court upheld many of the precedents of the Warren Court, even in regards to due process and criminal law. The latter era of the Warren Court was dominated by liberal justices, but the court shifted to the right early in 1969, following Nixon's appointments. Brennan and Marshall generally took liberal positions, while Stevens (after he replaced the liberal Douglas in 1975), Stewart, and White often took centrist positions, and Rehnquist, Burger, and (to a lesser extent) Powell made up the conservative bloc of the court. During his time on the court, Blackmun shifted from the right towards the center and eventually the left, allowing liberals to claim more victories as the 1970s continued. However, the conservatives on the court were strengthened in 1981 when Stewart was replaced by the more conservative O'Connor, who was also the first female justice. Nonetheless, Justice Brennan was often credited for winning the votes of the more centrist judges, especially Stevens, with his intellectual leadership. The large number of moderates on the court and the resulting decisions gave the court a paradoxical reputation for being both conservative and liberal. Although Burger was often overshadowed by the intellectual leadership of Brennan and Rehnquist, he earned a reputation as important judicial administrator who helped to create institutions such as the National Center for State Courts. Burger also often questioned the need for a judicial remedy in cases; Burger was a strong believer that courts could not cure all injustices, and Burger was not reluctant to limit the standing of plaintiffs.

== Appraisal ==
Law professor Michael J. Graetz and court journalist Linda Greenhouse characterize the Burger Court as conservative in many respects, handing down rulings that undermined Brown v. Board of Education and other liberal precedents of the Warren Court. More prosaically, publisher Larry Flynt, whose magazine Hustler was the subject of litigation throughout the 1980s, characterized the Burger Court as "nothing but eight assholes and a token cunt".

== Gallery ==
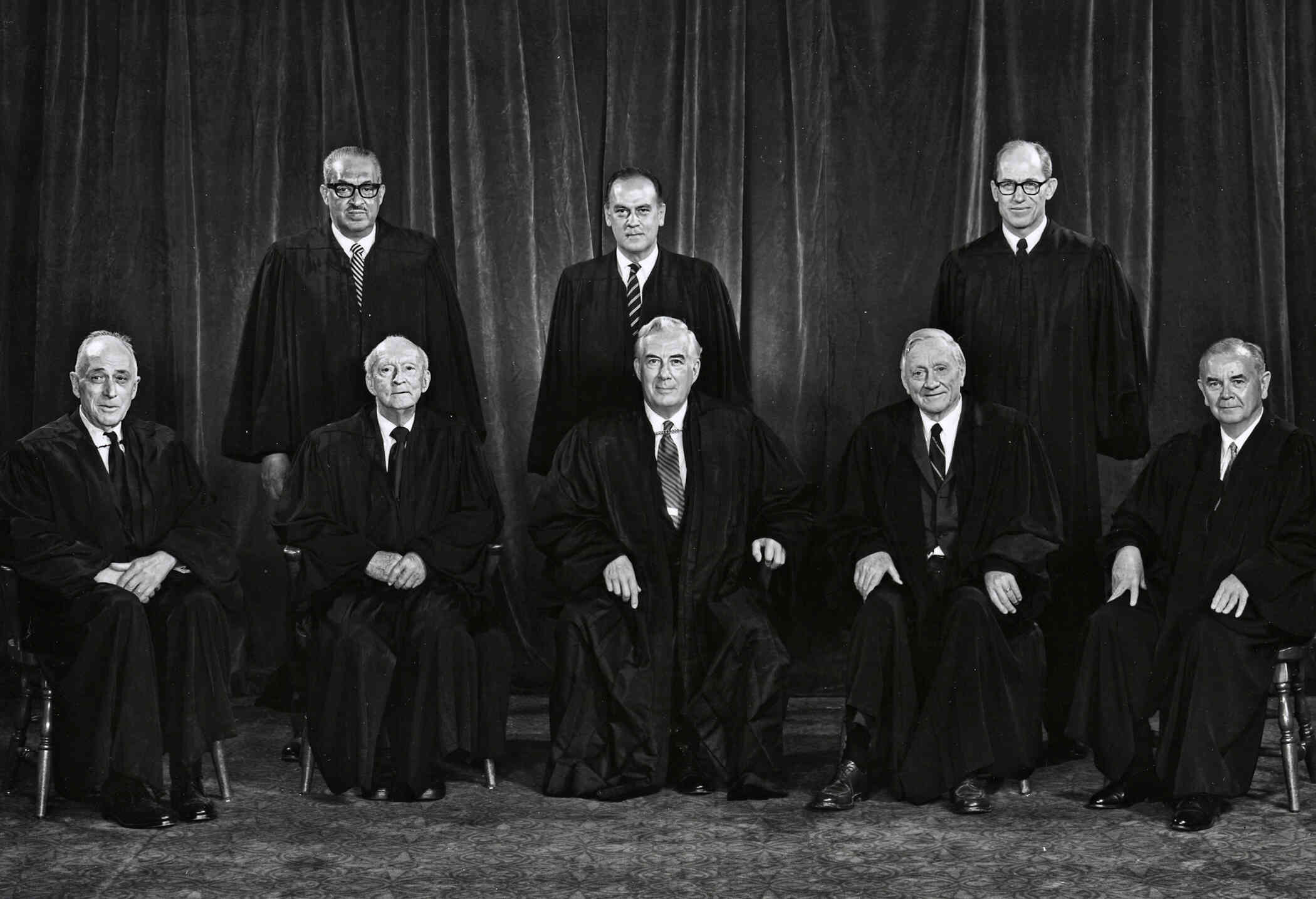
Burger Court
(June 23, 1969 – June 9, 1970)

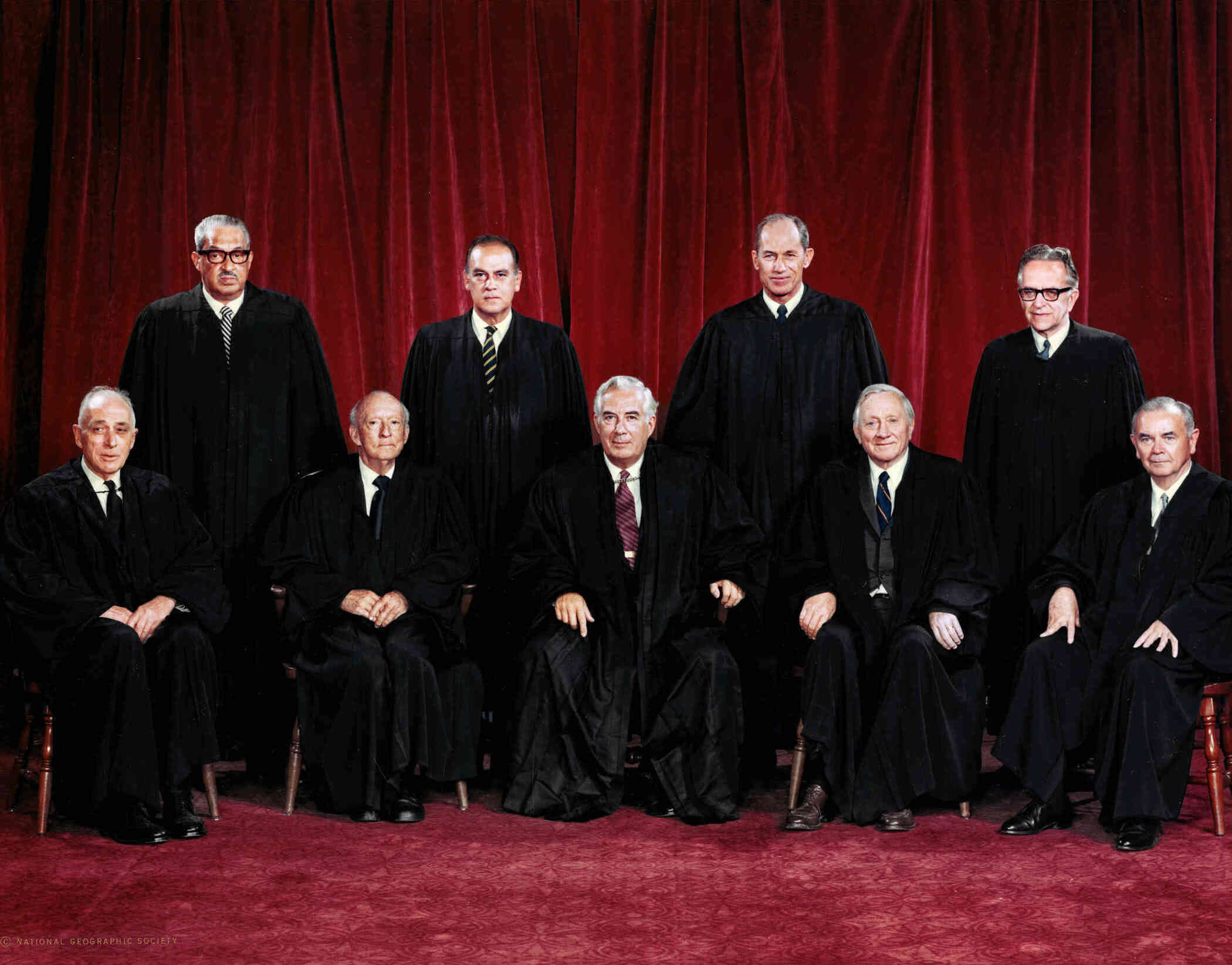
Burger Court
(June 9, 1970 – September 17, 1971)

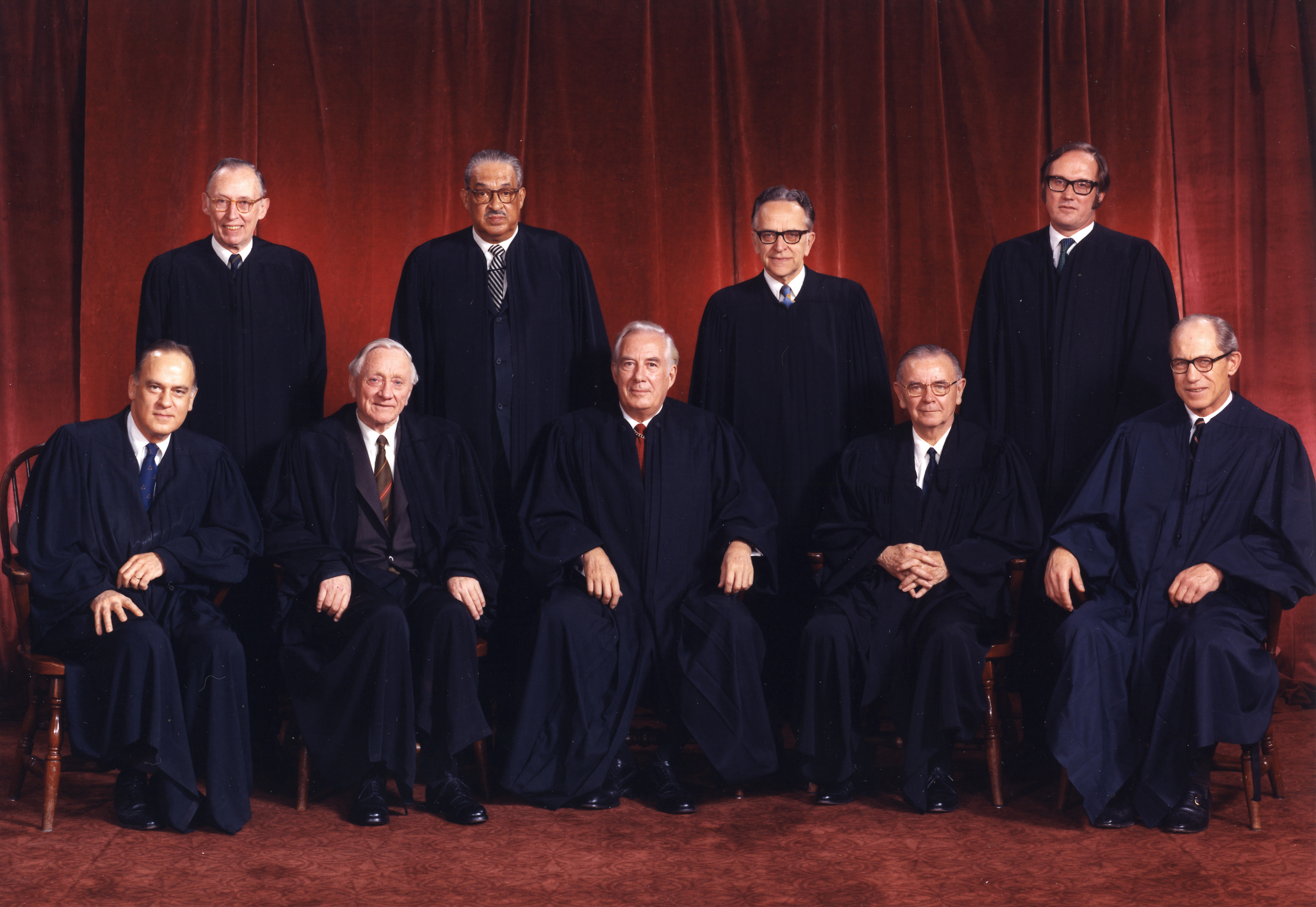
Burger Court
(January 7, 1972 – November 12, 1975)

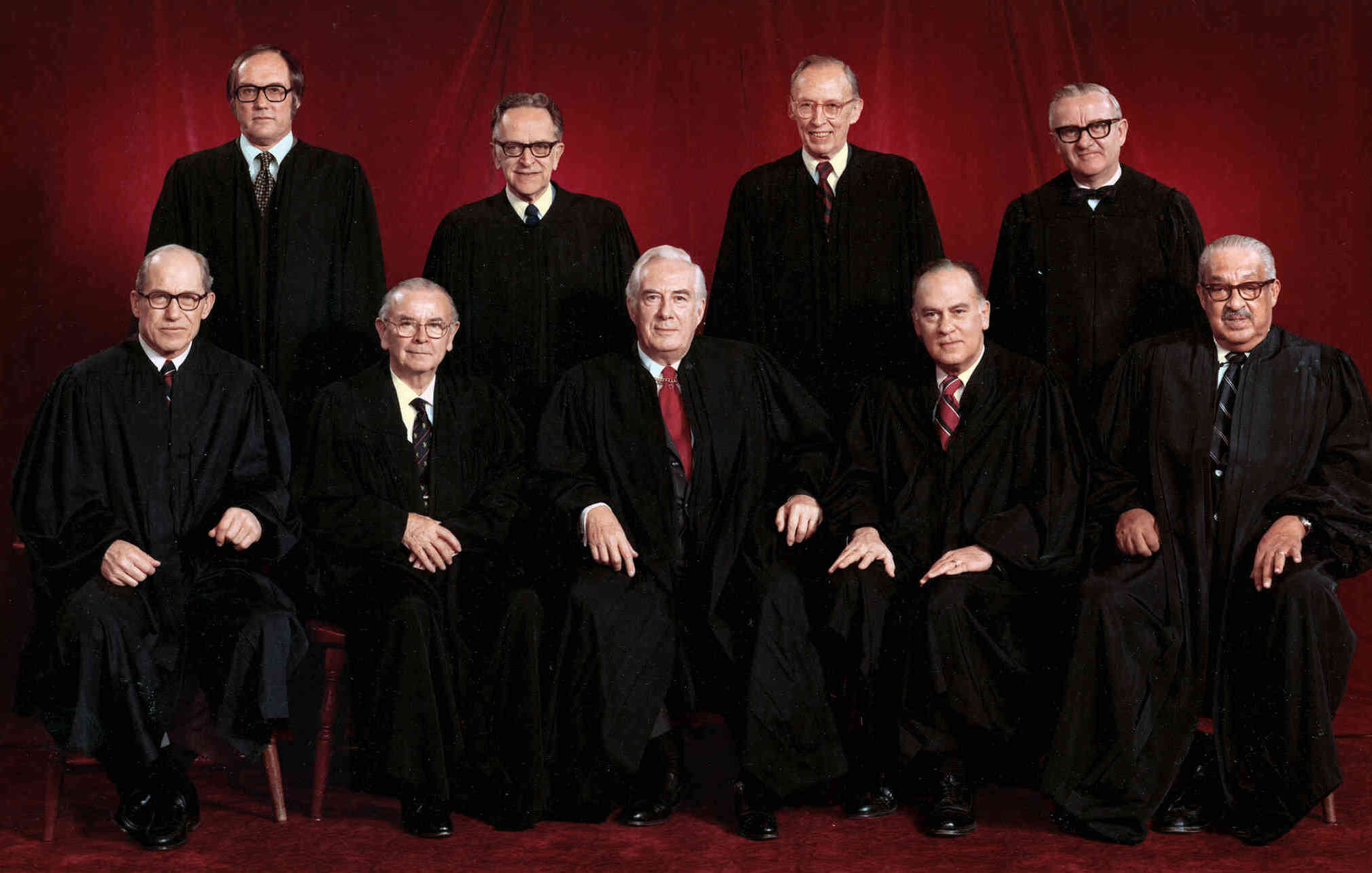
Burger Court
(December 19, 1975 – July 3, 1981)

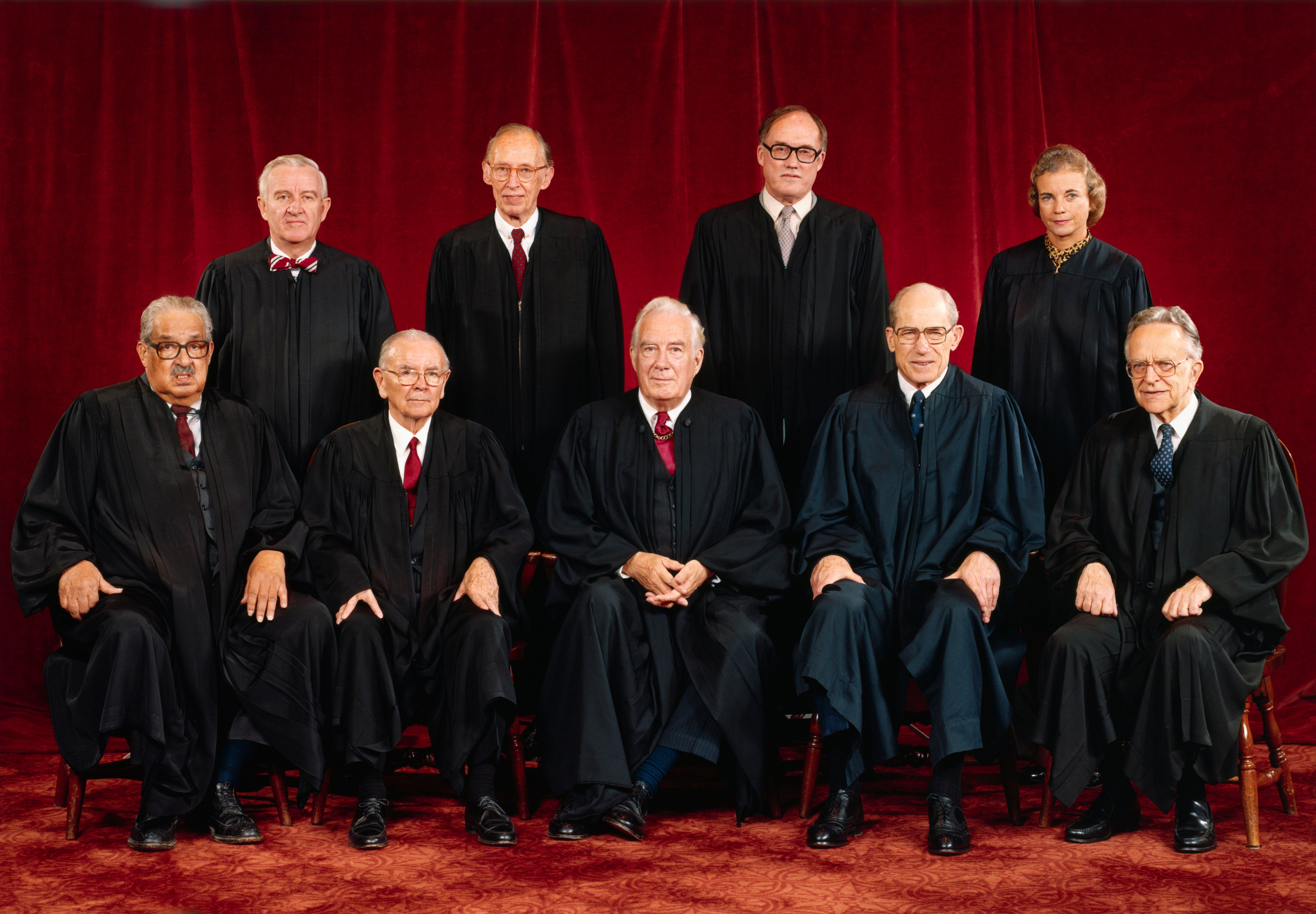
Burger Court
(September 25, 1981 – September 26, 1986)

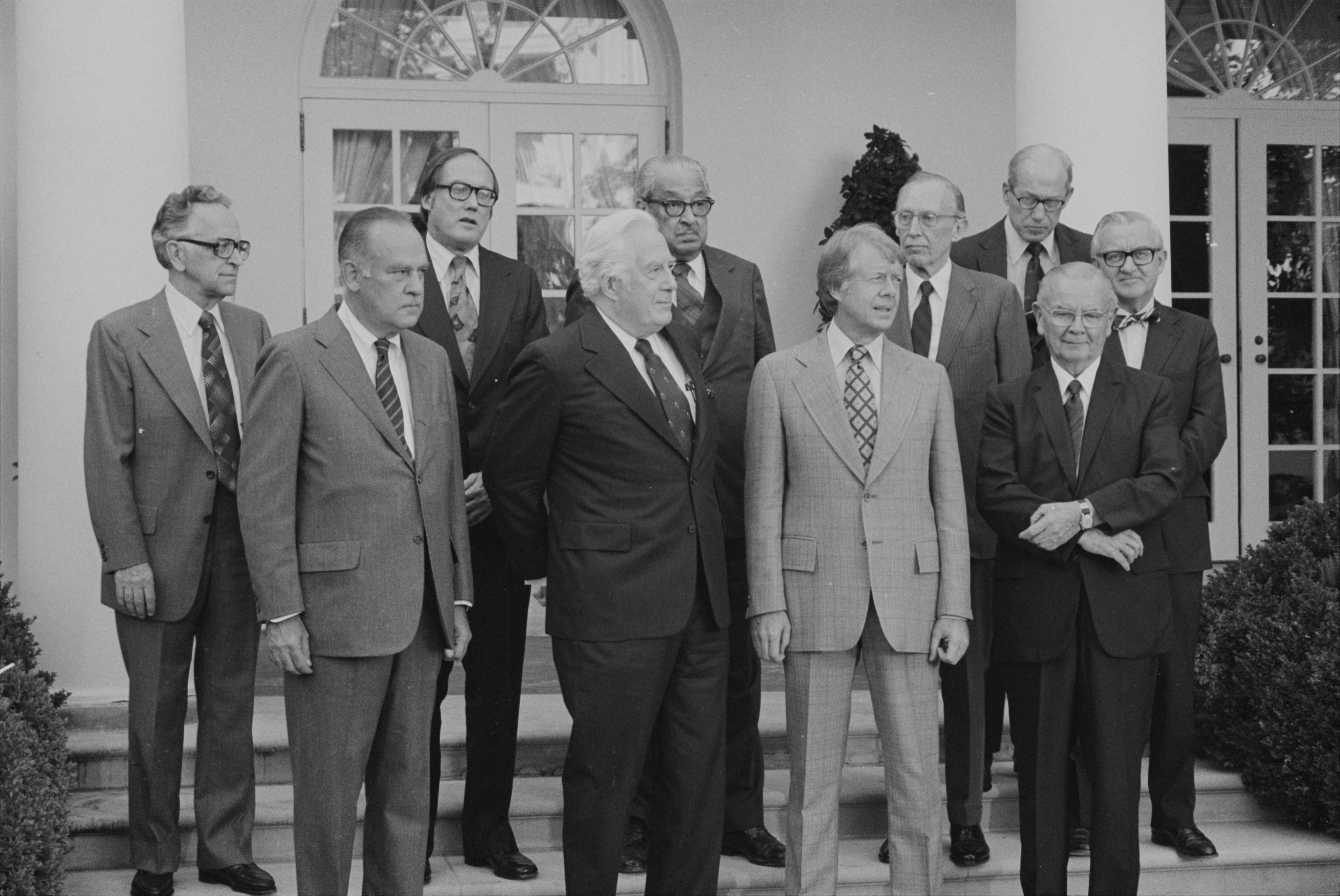
With then-President Jimmy Carter, 1977

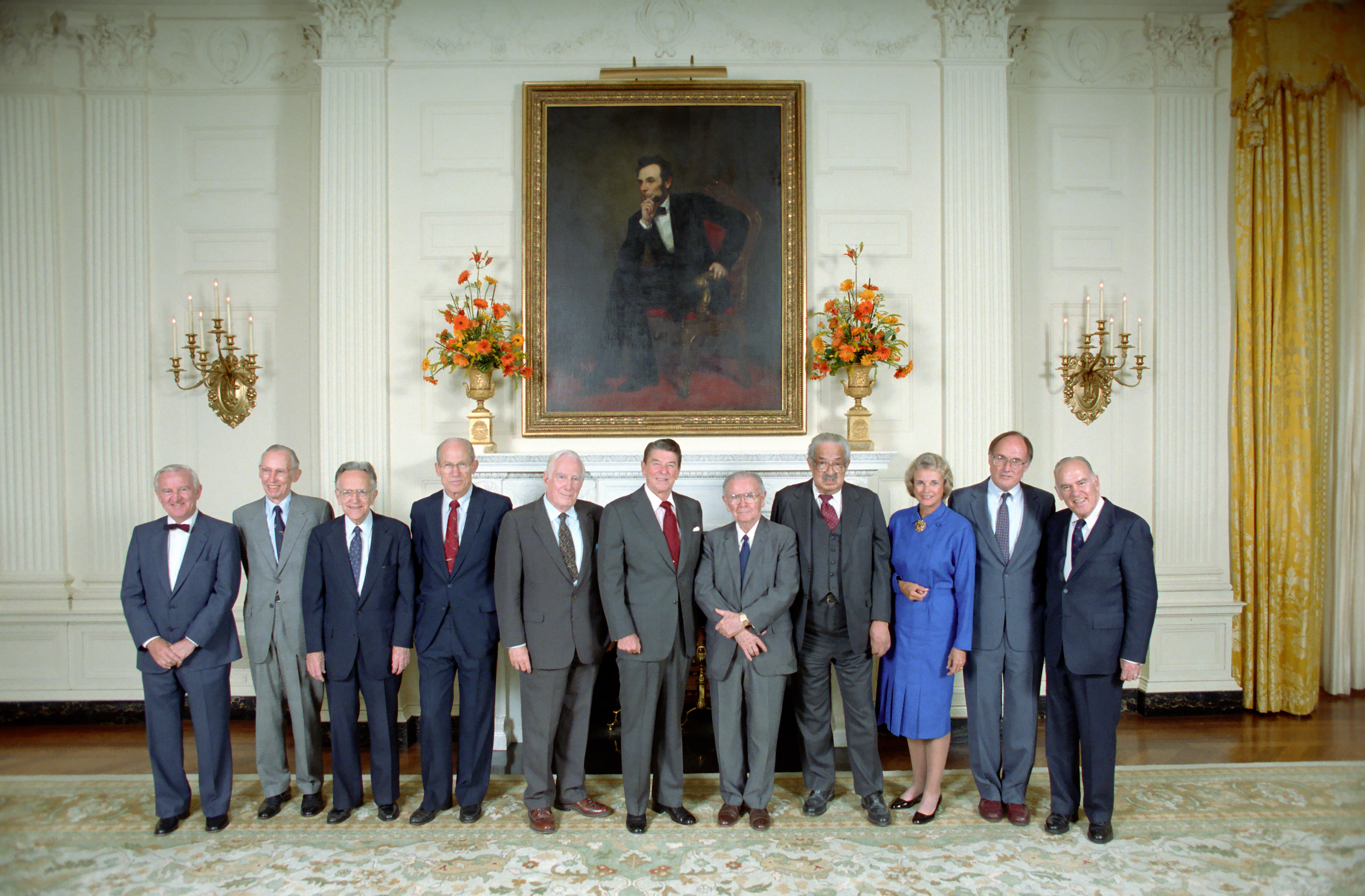
The Court in 1985 with then-President Ronald Reagan
