= Estelle Griswold =

American civil rights activist and feminist (1900–1981)

- Estelle Griswold, c. 1964
- Born: Estelle Naomi Trebert; June 8, 1900; Hartford, Connecticut, U.S.
- Died: August 13, 1981 (aged 81); Fort Myers, Florida, U.S.
- Spouse: Richard Whitmore Griswold (m. 1927; died 1966)
- Parent(s): Jennie Church; Frank Trebert

Estelle Naomi Trebert Griswold (née Trebert; June 8, 1900 – August 13, 1981) was a civil rights activist and feminist most commonly known as a defendant in what became the Supreme Court case Griswold v. Connecticut, in which contraception for married couples was legalized in the state of Connecticut, setting the precedent of the right to privacy. Griswold served as the executive director of Planned Parenthood in New Haven when she and Yale professor C. Lee Buxton opened a birth control clinic in New Haven in an attempt to change the Connecticut law banning contraception. Their actions set into motion legislation that resulted in both Poe v. Ullman and Griswold v. Connecticut.

Griswold's personal role in both cases was vital to achieving success and starting a women's rights movement that went on to aid the support for such cases as Roe v. Wade, for which Griswold v. Connecticut is often considered a precursor.

== Early life ==
Estelle ("Stelle") Trebert was born in Hartford, Connecticut, on June 8, 1900, to Frank (a toolmaker of Irish and German descent) and Jennie Church Trebert. Throughout Griswold's childhood, her father educated her thoroughly in Native American customs and strongly advocated for outdoor activity. Her mother is most commonly described as being reserved and "placid." Griswold was the younger of two surviving children (a brother had died before she was born); her older brother was Raymond Trebert. Their parents were said to have had a tumultuous marriage and serious "personality differences", but never divorced. Griswold was raised as a Roman Catholic but was not devout later in life.

Griswold attended Hartford public schools throughout her youth. Due to academic process, she skipped both fourth and seventh grades but graduated from high school in five years instead of the typical four due to her habitual truancy and her encouragement of other students, mainly boys, to skip school. After graduation from high school in 1920, Griswold began taking music classes at the Hartt School of Music. She wanted to go to college and further her academic career, but her family could not afford the tuition. As such, she worked in a bank in order to pay for the music school.

In 1922, Griswold moved to France to pursue a singing career, ignoring the disapproval of her parents. She had what was described as an impressive contralto singing voice, and traveled to both Paris and Nice for employment. While in France, Griswold contracted tuberculosis, limiting her abilities to work. She also became engaged to an aspiring playwright, but the relationship ended prior to the marriage.

Upon learning that her mother had fallen seriously ill, Griswold left Paris. Soon thereafter, both her parents died. Griswold did not return to Paris after their deaths but stayed in Hartford. Hoping to further her singing career, she did travel briefly, auditioning in New York and touring for six months with a Chicago-based show group. After this, she returned to Hartford and remained there until her marriage to Richard Griswold.

== Marriage ==
Estelle married Richard "Dick" Whitmore Griswold (b. Feb. 11, 1898 – d. Oct. 1, 1966) on October 20, 1927, at the Cathedral of St. John the Divine in New York City. The two had both attended Hartford High School, Richard being two years her senior. Though not close friends, they knew each other during their school years. Upon graduating from high school, he attended Yale University and spent a brief time in service during World War I. He went on to work in advertising, traveling throughout New York and New England for various jobs. After Griswold's return from France, they met again, beginning a relationship, and marrying in the fall of 1927. Due to this, Richard Griswold decided to take a job with the Guardian Life Insurance Agency, which offered him a salaried position. They briefly moved to New York, commuting from Mount Vernon to New York City for Richard's business and Griswold's singing jobs. Griswold took a job as a radio singer for such broadcasts as the NBC Red Network in 1929.

In 1935, Richard and Griswold moved from Connecticut to Washington D.C., where she began taking classes at George Washington University. While in D.C., Griswold decided to end her singing career given that her tutor had died, and she instead began studying medicine. Her advancement in the subject led her to become a medical instructor with the university.

== Life abroad ==
At the beginning of World War II, Richard left his advertising business and joined the Office of Political Affairs in the State Department, during which time he was sent abroad to Europe to help with various crises. In 1945, Griswold joined him in Europe, becoming involved with humanitarian efforts, including the aid of refugees, mainly from Eastern European countries. In attempting to gain employment at the United Nations Relief and Rehabilitation Agency (UNRRA), however, she was turned down. Eventually, she managed to bypass the initial employment offices and went straight to the top of the organization in order to achieve employment.

In doing so, Griswold became involved with the resettlement plan in Europe to aid refugees and send them away to such places as Rio de Janeiro, Algiers, and Puerto Rico. Throughout this time, she witnessed deep poverty and starvation, and came to the conclusion that the cause of this was ultimately overpopulation, as there was no access to birth control in these countries. This realization fueled her beliefs that women should be granted access to contraception to protect themselves, as they often faced the challenge of giving in to their husbands and dealing with an unwanted pregnancy or refusing them and suffering often abusive consequences.

Griswold ended her time with the Church World Service in 1951, feeling that the organization was not properly aiding refugees, instead being crass in their efforts.

== New Haven Planned Parenthood ==
Upon returning to the United States in 1950, Richard and Griswold moved to New Haven, Connecticut. Richard decided to continue working as an advertising executive and believed that moving to New Haven would be beneficial due to the appeal he could draw from the Yale community. During this time, Griswold became the Executive Secretary to the Human Relations Council, an unpaid volunteer job. In addition to this, she helped fund the infertility and marital counseling programs at Yale, the latter of which was run by the wife of lawyer Fowler Harper, who would play a large role in the litigation of Griswold's later case Griswold v. Connecticut. Her role in these programs was fueled by both her knowledge of population gained from experience abroad, as well as her empathy towards couples who, like her, could not have children.

Richard and Griswold lived at 40 Trumbull Street, directly next to Planned Parenthood's New Haven offices at the time, where they became familiar with various people throughout the building. Within the organization, many had been attempting to formulate new legislation to challenge the 1879 Connecticut law banning the use of contraception, facing challenges and scrutiny from many conservative organizations. It became clear that they would need a figurehead to operate the plan in order to attempt success who would be more docile than the radical liberals the courts were expecting. Estelle was quickly considered for involvement, as many knew her from her work in the Human Relations Council and understood her political platforms. The idea to involve Griswold came initially from a chance encounter with Jennie Heiser, assistant to the soon-to-be-retired Planned Parenthood Executive Director Nancy Williams, who half-jokingly offered her the upcoming position. Griswold was reluctant to accept the position at first, as she did not have a great deal of knowledge regarding birth control and did not know what a diaphragm was upon her first interview with PPLC President Molly Milmine, though diaphragms were the main source of birth control during the era. Overcoming these challenges, she finally accepted the position in late 1953, as she desperately needed a paying job, given that Richard had been diagnosed with emphysema in 1953 and could not work as frequently as he had in previous years.

On January 1, 1954, Griswold began her work as executive director of the Planned Parenthood League of Connecticut. Among her duties was the practice of organizing "border runs", in which women would be taken to New York or Rhode Island in order to seek birth control methods that were unavailable to them in Connecticut.

== Poe v. Ullman ==
Shortly after Griswold became executive director, she became involved in the movement to abolish the birth control laws within Connecticut. An 1879 state law outlawing the sale or manufacture of contraception had been upheld since its enactment, despite frequent protest at several state legislative meetings within the decades since. The law was sponsored by State legislator P. T. Barnum, of the Barnum and Bailey circus. Griswold, in an attempt to change the law, employed the help of two married women and a young married couple, all of whom needed contraception for medical reasons. She and Dr. C. Lee Buxton, Obstetrics and Gynecology Professor at Yale School of Medicine, brought the matter to the courts with the assistance of civil rights lawyers Fowler Harper and Catherine Roraback. The case involved a married couple, who underwent the aliases Paul and Pauline Poe, a young couple that had given birth to three children that had all died of medical complications shortly after their birth, as well as a woman under the alias of Jane Doe, who had experienced paralysis and speech impediment after almost dying in childbirth.

Buxton, the medical expert in the case, stated to the court that the couple required contraception to prevent further physical or mental deterioration, as this issue was genetic and could potentially recur if they were to have another child. However, the state courts upheld the statute, allowing Roraback to appeal to the US Supreme Court, who accepted their case. Griswold and Buxton had intended only to change the statute so that married women could seek contraception for medical purposes. However, in a 5–4 ruling issued on June 20, 1961, the Court upheld the Connecticut statute, declaring that the law had never been enforced and the consequence of its violation was not harmful and so was constitutional.

Shortly before the decision was announced, a Connecticut man was arrested and fined for providing condoms to gas stations, hoping that workers would sell them to customers. Multiple cases were reported in which people called the police regarding the incident. The man accused, however, did not face any serious punishment, which may have affected the Court's decision. Hearing this, Griswold and Buxton were angered by the Court's ruling and decided to test it further with the understanding that the law had never been significantly challenged.

== Griswold v. Connecticut ==
Griswold located a small building in which to open the clinic near to the Planned Parenthood offices at 79 Trumbull Street. The PPLC had saved $60 in the event that they should open a clinic, be it after contraception was legalized or as an experiment to test the law. They found several qualified and safe doctors willing to advise women and provide the proper medical care. The clinic opened in early November 1961 and almost immediately was met with controversy, largely due to protesters such as James Morris who picketed outside of the clinic with the message that what Griswold and Buxton were doing was immoral. Within days, detectives arrived to inspect the practice. Griswold allowed them to inspect and clearly informed them of the functions of the clinic. She was enthusiastic in her descriptions and provided specific and detailed information that she assumed would be used in the trial. She informed the detectives as they were leaving the clinic that she was fine with being arrested but refused to be fingerprinted or photographed.

Two days later, the detectives returned to the clinic demanding names of at least two patients that had been treated since the clinic's opening. Griswold chose a 33-year-old Yale Divinity School graduate and a graduate student in the Yale School of Public Health who was an English citizen and married to a colleague of Fowler Harper. Both provided their names and details of the assistance they were given at the clinic and signed formal statements. Though they had not specifically intended to get arrested to achieve their goals, Griswold and Buxton had no fear of doing so, believing that it would help their cause. The clinic was shut down on November 9, 1961, after the witnesses had given their statements, and Griswold and Buxton were charged with minor infractions pertaining to their distribution of birth control and each fined $100. As per Griswold's demand, neither she nor Buxton were fingerprinted or photographed.

Their lawyers immediately began their defense, having the stronger and more persuasive argument that that the law would now be enforced. This time, Griswold decided not to employ aliases during the trial, making it widely known as the Buxton case in local Connecticut courts and Griswold v. Connecticut when the appeal made it to the Supreme Court. The lead litigator on this case was Catherine Roraback with assistance from Thomas Emerson, who took over Fowler Harper's position after his death in 1963. 1963 was a year of significant internal tensions within Planned Parenthood and had much to do with Griswold's actions and motivations for finding a new Planned Parenthood headquarters. A new building had been purchased at 406 Orange Street with a carriage house at the back of the property.

Due to her husband's emphysema, Griswold proposed that the two use the carriage house as their private residence to ease her husband's difficulties regarding climbing stairs. Many Planned Parenthood members were angered by this proposition, especially because of the financial crisis faced by the organization. After many arguments and much resentment throughout this time period, Griswold made the decision to resign as executive director. However, because of the urgency of the forthcoming Supreme Court trial, as well as the general progress Griswold had made to advance Planned Parenthood since first taking the job, she was eventually persuaded to remain in her position.

The Supreme Court trial began in 1965. As with Poe v. Ullman, Griswold continued to argue that the anti-contraception law was a clear violation to the privacy of married couples, making it unconstitutional and dangerous. The decision in this case changed on the basis that the argument in Poe had become invalid because the law had since been enforced, with punishment enforced based on Griswold's violation. Regarding the evidence and constitutional background of the right to privacy, the Court voted 7–2 in favor of Griswold on June 7, 1965. The law was thereby held unconstitutional and married couples could now obtain birth control.

== Later life ==
Shortly after the Supreme Court decision was announced, Griswold resigned as executive director of Planned Parenthood. Reportedly, there was much tension between colleagues within the organization that she wanted to avoid. She remained in New Haven, even after Richard died of emphysema on October 1, 1966. Griswold died in Fort Myers, Florida on August 13, 1981, at the age of 81. She is buried in the cemetery of the Congregational Church in Wethersfield, Connecticut next to her husband.

Griswold was inducted into the Connecticut Women's Hall of Fame in 1994.
