= Colaianni =

Colaianni is a surname. Notable people with the surname include:

- James Colaianni (1922–2016), author, theologian and activist
- Joseph V. Colaianni (born 1933), trial judge of the United States Court of Claims
- Louis Colaianni (born 1959), voice and speech coach, and author
