= Another Country (novel) =

1962 novel by James Baldwin

- First edition cover
- Author: James Baldwin
- Language: English
- Genre: Novel
- Publisher: Dial Press
- Publication date: 1962
- Publication place: United States
- Media type: Print (hardcover, paperback)
- Pages: 436
- OCLC: 264020

Another Country is a 1962 novel by James Baldwin. The novel is primarily set in Greenwich Village, Harlem, and France in the late 1950s. It portrayed many themes that were taboo at the time of its release, including homosexuality, bisexuality, interracial couples, and extramarital affairs.

== Background ==
Baldwin started writing Another Country in Greenwich Village in 1948 and continued to write the novel in Paris and again in New York. Despite his privately confessed reluctance to bring "Another Country, unfinished, into yet another country," Baldwin completed the book in Istanbul in 1962. In 1959, amidst growing fame, Baldwin received a $12,000 grant from the Ford Foundation to support his work on the book.

Baldwin had returned to the United States in 1957, partly to cover the mounting Civil Rights Movement led by Martin Luther King Jr. Baldwin admired King, but sought to depict relationships deeper than King's "brotherly love."

== Plot summary ==
The book uses a third-person narrator who is nevertheless closely aware of the characters' emotions.

The first fifth of Another Country tells of the downfall of jazz drummer Rufus Scott. He begins a relationship with Leona, a white woman from the South, and introduces her to his social circle, including his closest friend, struggling novelist Vivaldo, his more successful mentor Richard, and Richard's wife, Cass. Initially, the relationship is frivolous, but it turns more serious as they continue to live together. Rufus becomes habitually physically abusive of Leona, and she is admitted to a mental hospital in the South. Depressed, Rufus returns to Harlem and commits suicide, jumping off the George Washington Bridge.

The rest of the book explores relationships between Rufus's friends, family, and acquaintances in the wake of his death. Rufus's friends cannot understand the suicide, and experience some guilt over his death. Afterwards, they become closer. Vivaldo begins a relationship with Rufus's sister Ida, which is strained by racial tension and Ida's bitterness after her brother's death.

Eric, an actor and Rufus's first male lover, returns to New York after years living in France, where he met his longtime lover Yves. Eric returns to the novel's social circle but is calmer and more composed than most of the group. Everyone's relationships become strained in the course of the novel. Ida starts having an affair with Ellis, an advertising executive who promises to help with her career as a singer. Cass, who has become lonely due to Richard's writing career, has an affair with Eric after he arrives in New York. At the novel's climax, Cass tells Richard about her affair with Eric, who in turn has a sexual encounter with Vivaldo, who himself learns about Ida's relationship with Ellis.

== Themes ==
=== Race and nationalism ===
Baldwin called Rufus Scott "the black corpse floating in the national psyche," as well as a Christ figure—a living (and dying) symbol of suffering black men. Rufus's death has been described as tantamount to murder.

Because Rufus is living in a predominantly racist era, his life is constantly affected by an internalization of this racism to the point where he hates himself. Throughout the novel, the effects of this internalized oppression are obvious: he is sexual with any person who is white — violently sexual, because he seeks power; he feels disappointed in himself in comparison to his proud Black sister Ida, and he avoids the support of his family during his last day of life.

The concept of "another country" reflects not only the return of Eric to the United States from France, but also the feelings of alienation experienced by African Americans within the United States.

Another Country was unique at the time, in its attempt to explore race relations through romantic love instead of homosocial friendships.

=== Love ===
The relationship between Ida and Vivaldo serves as a microcosm for the relationship between African Americans and white liberals. Their relationship and others (including the earlier coupling of Rufus and Leona) represent a struggle for love amidst the obstacles of race, sex, and modern society. According to Baldwin biographer W. J. Weatherby:

Whether it was the central relationship between white Vivaldo and black Ida or the accompanying bisexual affairs involving most of the other leading characters, all were intended by Baldwin to illustrate how difficult he felt real love was in contemporary American society. Facing each other without lies and perceiving the relationship realistically were much more important than which sexes were involved or how love was expressed, in Baldwin's opinion.… The whole racial situation, according to the novel, was basically a failure of love.

Racial and sexual differences are compared and contrasted, both represented as areas for conflict that must be addressed en route to mature love. According to some readings, this complete unity represents "another country" and perhaps an impossible utopia. Stefanie Dunning wrote:

Rufus' death suggests that there is no black utopia, no place where he can escape the iniquities of racism. More importantly, Another Country suggests that we have not yet found a model for thinking outside the box that frames our discussions of interraciality and same-sex eroticism. It suggests, more importantly, that eliminating gender and racial difference will not solve the "problems" of difference either. The title of the novel suggests the wish for "another country," another nation, in which our racial and sexual selves are imagined and defined differently or perhaps where they are not defined at all. It is at once a question: another country, illustrating the futility of national crossings, and it is a wistful fantasy: another country, a mythic, imaginary and unattainable place where relationships are not fractured by difference.

Dunning argues that the novel's critique of nationalism extends to black nationalism, which still relies on a fantasy of authentic and heterosexual reproduction.

=== Willing ignorance ===
One of the most significant themes in Another Country is one's willingness to ignore parts of reality (including oneself) that one finds unpleasant or ego-dystonic. Vivaldo is perhaps the most affected by this tendency. He also partially denies his own bisexuality. He fails to fully admit his attraction to Rufus. He does not see that his attraction to Ida potentially mirrors his attraction to Rufus. Also, despite mounting signs that Ida is involved in a career-advancing affair with the white TV producer Ellis, Vivaldo mostly denies this until the disillusioned Ida confesses to him herself in a cathartic scene near the end of the book.

At the opposite end of the spectrum, after considerable youthful struggles with self-acceptance of his homosexuality due to social ostracism in his hometown in Alabama, Eric eventually becomes the novel's most honest and open character. He admits that Rufus was abusive of Leona, that he actually does not reciprocate Cass's love, and that his love of Yves is genuine. This also makes him the book's calmest and most composed character. Only after a night with Eric does Vivaldo see the world more clearly and make tentative steps toward acceptance of his own bisexuality.

Most of the white characters in the book downplay or refuse to admit the racial tension surrounding them. Cass and Richard are shocked when a group of black boys beat up their sons. Ida constantly suspects Vivaldo of exploiting her because she is black and has known white men who seek out sexual relations specifically with black women. Vivaldo refuses to admit any of this, although it is indicated that it may be true of their relationship.

=== Professional jealousy ===
Richard and Vivaldo are jealous of one another as writers. Vivaldo essentially denies the value of Richard's first novel and is jealous that it is being published, while Richard is jealous of Vivaldo because Richard thinks his wife Cass sees suffering and a lack of commercial success as a sign of artistic integrity. Consequently, after Cass and Eric initiate their affair, Richard suspects she is seeing Vivaldo.

Also, Ida's beginning recognition as a jazz singer causes increased tension and jealousy between her and Vivaldo.

=== Black homosexual masculinity ===
In his 1968 essay "Notes On A Native Son", from his book Soul on Ice, Eldridge Cleaver denounced the concept of interracial homosexuality and, in effect, acted as the mouthpiece for the hegemonic narrative that framed black homosexual masculinity in America in the 1960s. He expressed not so much a discomfort with homosexuality as with the power paradigm and ultimate feminization that ensues after the physical act of black men sexually submitting to white men:

It seems that many Negro homosexuals, acquiescing in this racial death-wish, are outraged and frustrated because in their sickness they are unable to have a baby by a white man. The cross they bear is that, already bending over and touching their toes for the white man, the fruit of their miscegenation is not the little half-white offspring of their dreams but an increase in the unwinding of their nerves – though they redouble their efforts and intake of the white man's sperm. (p. 102).

In the eyes of Cleaver, Rufus Scott of Another Country is a failure to his race because he fails to act as "the referent for masculinity, sexuality, and raciality" (Dunning 104). According to black nationalists of the time, the future of the black race is reliant upon reproduction. At the first Plenary Conference on Self Determination in 1981, a flyer read "Homosexuality does not produce children. [It] does not birth new warriors for liberation" (Cheney, 113). In sexually submitting to the white man, Rufus has fulfilled his own death-wish literally and figuratively because, according to Stephanie Dunning:

[T]o be both homosexual and black is to express a hatred for blackness.…In this construction, to be black is to be feminized and to be homosexual is to be castrated. Homosexuality, then, is the ultimate threat to being the man, since it presumably takes away that which makes you one: the impregnating phallus.

So Rufus is the embodiment of the pervasive, oppressive nationalist viewpoint that burdened and continues to burden homosexual men of color. Rufus is by no means a proponent of the black nationalist homophobia, but instead a victim to it. In his romantic relationship with his Southern white friend Eric, Rufus internalizes this concept that in "receiving" Eric, he is allowing Eric to dominate him; and yet, in Another Country, Baldwin professes and emphasizes that it is the vulnerability within this power paradigm in interracial same-sex relationships that will ultimately break down racial barriers. In reshaping masculinity and expectations of black men in particular, we can shift the power dynamic that leads to violence and aggression in men, particularly black men. In speaking about his relationship with Rufus, Vivaldo remarks:

Well, perhaps they had been afraid that if they looked too closely into one another, each would have found – he looked out of the window, feeling damp and frightened. Each would have found the abyss. Somewhere in his heart, the black boy hated the white boy because he was white. Somewhere in his heart, Vivaldo hated and feared Rufus because he was black. (p. 134)

With his privilege as a white man, Vivaldo is able to step back and see homosexual sex for what it is, which is an act of vulnerability and trust, rather than dominance and submission as seen through the eyes of Rufus.

== Reception ==
Another Country received much attention and mixed reviews. Reviews in the black press were generally favorable. The New York Times called it "a sad story, brilliantly and fiercely told" and compared it to T. S. Eliot's The Waste Land as a record of spiritual desolation in modern times. Time magazine called it "a failure". Norman Mailer said it was "abominably written".

A film adaptation was announced in 1964, with Tony Richardson directing and Baldwin himself writing the screenplay, though the film was never produced.

The book was designated "obscene" in New Orleans and banned due to including descriptions of LGBT love and sex, drawing the attention of FBI director J. Edgar Hoover.

In Australia, the Commonwealth Customs Department banned its import. The country's Literature Censorship Board, while admitting Baldwin's writing had some merit, described Another Country as "continually smeared with indecent, offensive and dirty epithets and allusions". The chairman noted that some might connect the novel's depiction of race relations with current events in Australia, and bearing in mind that a complete ban might damage the country's reputation, suggested that the book be available to "the serious minded student or reader." In 1966 Alexander William Sheppard, an Australian bookseller, announced his plan to publish Another Country by dint of airmailing a number of letters to Australia, each containing a number of pages from the book, and then assembling all the pages received and printing the book. He did this and the Australian ban was lifted.

Baldwin inferred from the book's popularity that "many more people than are willing to admit it lead lives not at all unlike the lives of the people in my book." Baldwin also said that the book "scared people because most don't understand it."

Eldridge Cleaver had harsh words for Baldwin, in his book Soul on Ice, writing that he admired Baldwin in some ways but felt increasingly uncomfortable with his writing. Cleaver says that Another Country made clear why his "love for Baldwin's vision had become ambivalent," and writes:

Rufus Scott, a pathetic wretch who indulged in the white man's pastime of committing suicide, who let a white homosexual fuck him in the ass, and who took a Southern Jezebel for his woman, with all that these tortured relationships imply, was the epitome of a black eunuch who has completely submitted to the white man. Yes, Rufus was a psychological freedom rider, turning the ultimate cheek, murmuring like a ghost "You took the best so why not take the rest", which has absolutely nothing to do with the way that Negroes have managed to survive here in the hells of North America!

The book was listed by Anthony Burgess as one of his Ninety-nine Novels: The best in English since 1939.

== Analysis ==
On writing the book, Baldwin said in the New York Times Book Review:

I think I really helplessly model myself on jazz musicians and try to write the way they sound. I am not an intellectual, not in the dreary sense that word is used today, and do not want to be: I am aiming at what Henry James called 'perception at the pitch of passion.'

Asked to cite literary influences, Baldwin said that Joseph Conrad, James Joyce, Fyodor Dostoyevsky, and George Bernard Shaw were his "models." The character of Yves is connected to Baldwin's lover Lucien Happersberger, who made plans in 1960 to meet Baldwin in New York City.

It has been argued that James Baldwin is in three characters: Rufus as Baldwin would have turned out had he not moved to France; Eric as Baldwin was in Paris; and Vivaldo as a writer struggling with a writer's block because of his love affairs, in the manner of Baldwin himself. Baldwin has also been identified with Ida, as Rufus's advocate after death, and Richard, a writer who has become successful but is still filled with self doubt.

Baldwin later said that he developed the character of Rufus to complement and explain Ida.

The book has been described as an implicit criticism of Mailer's The White Negro and its passive romanticization of black culture. Brandon Gordon describes this critique in terms of the relationship between Vivaldo and Rufus, mediated by Leona. Gordon writes: "Contrary to Vivaldo's expectations, emulating the African American's hypermasculine sexual ethos does not ultimately enable him to fulfill the hipster's fantasy of embodied identification." He concludes that, in fact, Vivaldo's homosexual encounter with Eric at the end of the novel—and specifically the fact that Vivaldo is penetrated—represents a truer form of "embodied identification" with another.

One author felt the title echoes lines in Christopher Marlowe's The Jew of Malta:

Thou hast committed—
Fornication: but that was in another country;
And besides, the wench is dead.
