= Soul on Ice (book) =

1968 prison memoir by Eldridge Cleaver

- First edition cover
- Author: Eldridge Cleaver
- Language: English
- Genre: Prison memoir
- Publisher: McGraw-Hill
- Publication date: 1968
- Publication place: United States
- Media type: Print (hardcover, paperback)
- Pages: 210 pp
- ISBN: 0070113076

Soul on Ice is a book of essays and letters written by Eldridge Cleaver while he was serving time in San Quentin State Prison and Folsom State Prison. His writings first appeared in Ramparts magazine in 1966, and were collected in book form in Soul on Ice, published by McGraw-Hill in 1968. Although the book ranges over many topics, it is usually classified as a memoir because much of it is a retelling of Cleaver's life, how he came to be in prison, and the evolution of his religious beliefs and radical politics.

Soul on Ice was widely read and discussed for its searing commentary on white society in America, and the black experience within it. The book was highly controversial, and subject to censorship, for its provocative statements and opinions. The author was hailed as "an authentic voice of black rage in a white-ruled world." The New York Times named Soul on Ice one of the 10 best books of 1968.

By autumn of 1970, two million copies were in print. Cleaver went on to publish other writings, but Soul on Ice remains his best-known work and a seminal volume in African-American literature.

== Background ==
Eldridge Cleaver was born in August 1935 in Wabbaseka, Arkansas, at a time when pernicious racism prevailed in the segregated South. In 1946, his family moved to Watts, California, where he began engaging in petty crime. After a series of arrests for bicycle theft and vandalism, he was sent in 1954 to Soledad State Prison for possessing a large quantity of marijuana. During this stretch in prison, he earned a high school diploma while reading the works of Niccolò Machiavelli, Voltaire, Jean-Jacques Rousseau, Thomas Paine, Karl Marx, Vladimir Lenin, W. E. B. Du Bois, Richard Wright, Thomas Merton, and Thomas Wolfe.

In 1957, Cleaver was released from Soledad. Later that year, he was convicted of sexual assault with intent to murder. He was sent to San Quentin and then transferred to Folsom. He began to write regularly about his physical and mental imprisonment, his personal transformation, and the political events and cultural happenings of the era.

In 1965, he sent a letter to Beverly Axelrod, a Bay Area-based attorney, asking her to represent him. She agreed and their relationship proved instrumental in the publication of Soul on Ice. When she visited him in prison, she smuggled him contraband leftist books and magazines, and he slipped his prison essays into the stacks of legal papers she carried with her.

She showed his essays to Edward Michael Keating, founder of Ramparts magazine, who began publishing them in June 1966. After Cleaver was paroled in December 1966, he was hired as a Ramparts staff writer in their San Francisco office. He also joined the fledgling Black Panther Party in Oakland. His prison writings, a number of which had already appeared in Ramparts, were collected in the volume Soul on Ice, and published by McGraw-Hill in early 1968.

== Description ==
The essays in Soul on Ice are divided into four thematic sections:

- "Letters from Prison", recounts Cleaver's experiences with, and thoughts on, crime and prisons.
- "Blood of the Beast", discusses race relations and black liberation ideology.
- "Prelude to Love—Three Letters", contains two love letters Cleaver wrote to Beverly Axelrod, and one love letter from her to Cleaver.
- "White Woman, Black Man", reflects on gender relations, black masculinity, and sexuality.

In the Introduction, Maxwell Geismar likens Soul on Ice to Frantz Fanon's Black Skin, White Masks, stating that in both books, "the central problem is of identification as a black soul which has been 'colonized' ... by an oppressive white society that projects its brief, narrow vision of life as eternal truth." Geismar especially praises the last portion of Soul on Ice where the author "has reached his own spiritual convalescence, his healed spirit (no longer racist or narrowly nationalist), and his mature power as a writer".

Cleaver immediately courts controversy in the opening essay, "On Becoming". He describes his realization as a young man that he had been "indoctrinated to see the white woman as more beautiful and desirable than my own black woman." In the wake of the 1955 lynching in Mississippi of Emmett Till for allegedly flirting with a white woman, Cleaver says he developed an "antagonistic, ruthless attitude toward white women" that he acted upon when released from prison in 1957:

I became a rapist. To refine my technique and modus operandi, I started out by practicing on black girls in the ghetto—in the black ghetto where dark and vicious deeds appear not as aberrations or deviations from the norm, but as part of the sufficiency of the Evil of a day—and when I considered myself smooth enough, I crossed the tracks and sought out white prey. I did this consciously, deliberately, willfully, methodically—though looking back I see that I was in a frantic, wild, and completely abandoned frame of mind. Rape was an insurrectionary act. It delighted me that I was defying and trampling upon the white man's law, upon his system of values, and that I was defiling his women—and this point, I believe, was the most satisfying to me because I was very resentful over the historical fact of how the white man has used the black woman. I felt I was getting revenge.

In a spirit of confession, he soon adds:

After I returned to prison, I took a long look at myself and, for the first time in my life, admitted that I was wrong, that I had gone astray—astray not so much from the white man's law as from being human, civilized—for I could not approve the act of rape. Even though I had some insight into my own motivations, I did not feel justified. I lost my self-respect. My pride as a man dissolved and my whole fragile moral structure seemed to collapse, completely shattered. That is why I started to write. To save myself.

In the essay, "The White Race and Its Heroes", he mentions how he was inspired by the current generation of white youths who were battling racism in the South and thereby commanding his respect: "If a man like Malcolm X could change and repudiate racism, if I myself and other former Muslims can change, if young whites can change, then there is hope for America."

In the book's other essays, he navigates through the history and present state of his country. He covers areas such as the race riots occurring in U.S. cities; the murders of Malcolm X and Emmett Till; the Vietnam War, U.S. foreign policy and the American Flag; Muhammad Ali, Martin Luther King Jr. and other black notables of the 1960s; Richard Wright's Native Son; Islam and Christianity; day-to-day prison life; and the nature of black manhood.

Cleaver sparked controversy with his essay "Notes on a Native Son", which is a homophobic criticism of the writings of author James Baldwin. In an article in African American Review, Zachary Manditch-Prottas called Cleaver's attack on Baldwin "the most notorious and frequently cited example of homophobia in the Black Power era." In her 1979 book Black Macho and the Myth of the Superwoman, black feminist author Michele Wallace singled out Cleaver's Soul on Ice for reinforcing the harmful "black macho" stereotype.

== Censorship ==
Soon after its publication, Soul on Ice was banned from certain school libraries for its references to miscegenation.

It was later one of eleven books involved in the 1982 U.S. Supreme Court case, Island Trees School District v. Pico. The targeted books were removed from high school and junior high school libraries by the Board of Education of the Island Trees Union Free School District in New York for being "anti-American, anti-Christian, anti-Semitic, and just plain filthy".

== See also ==
- Another Country
- Prison literature
- Ramparts magazine
