= Jean Scharfenberg =

American theater professor (1922–1998)

- Born: August 19, 1922; Davenport
- Died: August 2, 1998 (aged 75); Bloomington
- Alma mater: University of Wisconsin–Madison
- Occupation: Academic staff, researcher, university teacher, theatre director
- Employer: Illinois State University (1966–1993)

Jean Scharfenberg (August 19, 1922 - August 2 1998) was an American educator who was professor of theatre at Illinois State University (ISU). She taught Gary Cole, Jane Lynch, Rondi Reed, Laurie Metcalf, Tom Irwin and John Malkovich.

== Early life and education ==
Scharfenberg was born in Davenport, Iowa, and earned her undergraduate degree at University of Central Missouri University. She then earned her masters degree and doctoral degree in theater from the University of Wisconsin. While at the University of Wisconsin, she earned a federal grant to work with Lee Strasberg.

== Career ==
Scharfenberg joined the ISU faculty in 1966. She was known among students for her class "Acting: Exploring Characterization Through Animal Exercises" in which students developed the persona of an animal and then enacted a violent death scene at the end of the semester. She directed ISU's mainstage plays during the school year and Shakespeare Festival in the summer. Under the direction of Scharfenberg and her colleagues Ralph Lane, John Kirk, and Cal Pritner ISU Theatre became a distinct department, instead of a sub-division of the speech department. In the 1990-1991 school year, Scharfenberg won two awards, the Outstanding Teacher in the College of Fine Arts and the Outstanding University Teacher. She believed that acting could be used to spark creativity in the community, which would create better leaders, lovers, and followers. Scharfenberg also held numerous acting roles in the Westhoff and Allen theater stages. She retired in 1993.

== Bibliography ==
- Lee Strasberg, 1963
