= Louis Colaianni =

American actor

Louis Colaianni (born April 29, 1959 in Paterson, New Jersey) is an American voice, speech, dialect and text coach and director in the professional theatre, with specialisation in Shakespeare performance.

He has taught in many actor-training programs and served as voice and text coach for productions at theatres throughout the United States, including, Santa Fe Opera, Playwrights Horizons, The Culture Project, Williamstown Theatre Festival, Westport Country Playhouse, The McCarter Theatre, The Labyrinth Theatre, Oregon Shakespeare Festival, Kansas City Repertory Theatre, Milwaukee Repertory Theatre, Arizona Theatre Company, Shakespeare Santa Cruz, Shakespeare Festival of St Louis, Trinity Repertory Theatre, Utah Shakespearean Festival and Seattle Repertory Theatre.

He was a tenured, associate professor at University of Missouri–Kansas City. He is a visiting associate professor at Yale School of Drama, where he teaches Voice into Shakespeare, and adjunct associate professor at Syracuse University, Department of Drama, where he teaches Speech and Dialects. For seven years, he taught Acting Classics at the Actors Studio Drama School at Pace University, and for several years, taught Acting Classics and Voice at Vassar College, as adjunct associate professor. Louis Colaianni has given workshops internationally. He invented the Phonetic Pillows approach to Phonetics and Stage Accents which is used by many actor training programs. He studied voice with Kristin Linklater and is a Designated Linklater Teacher.

He is the author of several books including, The Joy of Phonetics and Accents, Shakespeare's Names: A New Pronouncing Dictionary, Bringing Speech to Life (with Claudia Anderson), and How to Speak Shakespeare (with Cal Pritner).

He recently served as dialect coach for the Amazon Prime series Red Oaks and the Santa Fe Opera production of Mozart's The Impresario directed by Michael Gieleta, Off-Broadway production of Eve Ensler's play Emotional Creature, directed by Jo Bonney, the Williamstown Theatre Festival production of June Moon directed by Jessica Stone and the LAByrinth Theater Company production of The Little Flower of East Orange, by Stephen Adly Guirgis, directed by Philip Seymour Hoffman. He was dialect coach to Bill Murray for the films Hyde Park on Hudson and St. Vincent, Don Cheadle for the film Miles Ahead, Anna Gunn for the film Little Red Wagon, Richard Schiff for the McCarter Theatre's Talley's Folly, under the supervision of Lanford Wilson, and America Ferrera (prep) for the film Chavez. He was vocal coach to Will Ferrell for the Broadway and HBO productions of You're Welcome America.

Louis Colaianni's father, James F. Colaianni, was an author, theologian and activist who wrote Married Priests and Married Nuns and The Catholic Left, and was editor of Ramparts.
