= Edward Michael Keating =

American publisher, author, politician

Edward Michael Keating Sr.
- Born: April 17, 1925; New Jersey, U.S.
- Died: April 2, 2003 (aged 77); Stanford, California, U.S.
- Other name: Edward M. Keating
- Education: Stanford Law School
- Occupations: Newspaper publisher, journalist, author, lawyer, politician, businessman
- Known for: Left-wing politics, activism
- Spouse: Helen English
- Children: 6

Edward Michael Keating Sr. (April 17, 1925 – April 2, 2003) was an American newspaper publisher, journalist, author, lawyer, politician, and businessman. He was the founder and publisher of Ramparts, a magazine in print 1962 to 1975, that had started as a Catholic literary magazine and evolved into a voice for the civil rights movement, the anti-war movement, and support of the New Left movement.

== Early life ==
Edward Michael Keating Sr. was born on April 17, 1925, in New Jersey. In 1940, when he was a teenager, the family moved to Menlo Park, California. During World War II, Keating served in the Pacific in the United States Navy. He attended Stanford Law School, graduating in 1950. He married Helen English, who also attended Stanford.

He was raised as a Protestant and converted to Roman Catholicism in 1954.

== Career ==
After college he worked for 4 years as a commercial real estate lawyer, followed by teaching English at the Santa Clara University for one year. In 1962, he found and published Ramparts, a Catholic quarterly literary magazine based in Menlo Park. He personally financed the quarterly publication, and the magazine reached circulation of 400,000. Ramparts printed articles about the murders of three civil rights workers in Mississippi; and in 1967 they exposed the Central Intelligence Agency's secret financing of the National Student Association. Writers in Ramparts included Susan Sontag, Seymour Hersh, Robert Scheer, Eldridge Cleaver, and John Howard Griffin.

In 1965, Keating left the Catholic church and became agnostic, and in the same year wrote the book The Scandal of Silence (1965) about the Catholic Church during World War II.

On December 12, 1966, Keating helped Eldridge Cleaver get paroled from Folsom State Prison and get hired as a staff writer at Ramparts. Keating was forced to leave Ramparts in 1967, and ran for United States Congress for the 11th Congressional District seat in San Mateo. He lost the election to Pete McCloskey.

Keating wrote a few books, short stories, and novellas after his Congressional run. He served on the legal council for Huey Newton of the Black Panthers Party. In 1971, Keating published the book Free Huey!. In March 2003, he donated his 1960s Black Panther documents to the Black Panthers Papers at Stanford University.

== Death ==
Keating died of pneumonia on April 2, 2003, at Stanford Hospital in Stanford, California. At the time of his death he was living in Mountain View, California. He was survived by 6 children.

== Publications ==
- Keating, Edward M. (1965). The Scandal of Silence. New York City, NY: Random House.
- Keating, Edward M. (1971). Free Huey!. a Dell book. Charles R. Garry (introduction). Berkeley, CA: Rapparts Press. ISBN 9780878670000.
- Keating, Edward M. (1975). The Broken Bough: The Solution to the Riddle of Man. New York City, NY: Atheneum. ISBN 9780689106798.

== See also ==
- Pacific Counseling Service
- List of underground newspapers of the 1960s counterculture
