= Liberated Barracks =

Underground publication in Hawaii (1971–1974)

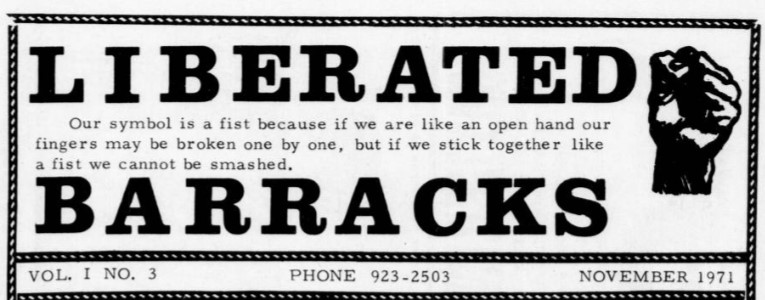
- Masthead of Liberated Barracks, late 1971
- First issue: 1971
- Final issue: 1974
- Based in: Kailua, Hawaii

Liberated Barracks was an underground publication in Hawaii, printed from 1971 to 1974. Associated with the New Left and the GI Underground Press, the periodical provided advice to those resisting the Vietnam War and shared anti-war statements. Its publishers also maintained houses near local military bases where soldiers could seek counsel and freely discuss topics including the war.

== Background ==
The New Left movement, which opposed the Vietnam War and the draft, included an underground press which agitated against the war as well as related issues including racism and poverty. Roughly 1,500 underground publications were produced from 1964 to 1975, out of over 11,000 total publications.

Hawaii was a key location for the United States military during the war, serving as a staging area from which soldiers and supplies were shipped to Southeast Asia. Hawaii was home to about 15 underground publications out of 75 publications in total during the period, a substantially higher ratio than the national average. These publications, initially inspired by the Los Angeles Free Press and the Berkeley Barb, were generally made through cheap offset printing. The first underground periodical in Hawaii was Carrion Crow, which appeared in late 1967.

Later in the war, the development of the GI Underground Press led to the creation of at least 4 underground GI papers in Hawaii, including Liberated Barracks.

== Publication ==
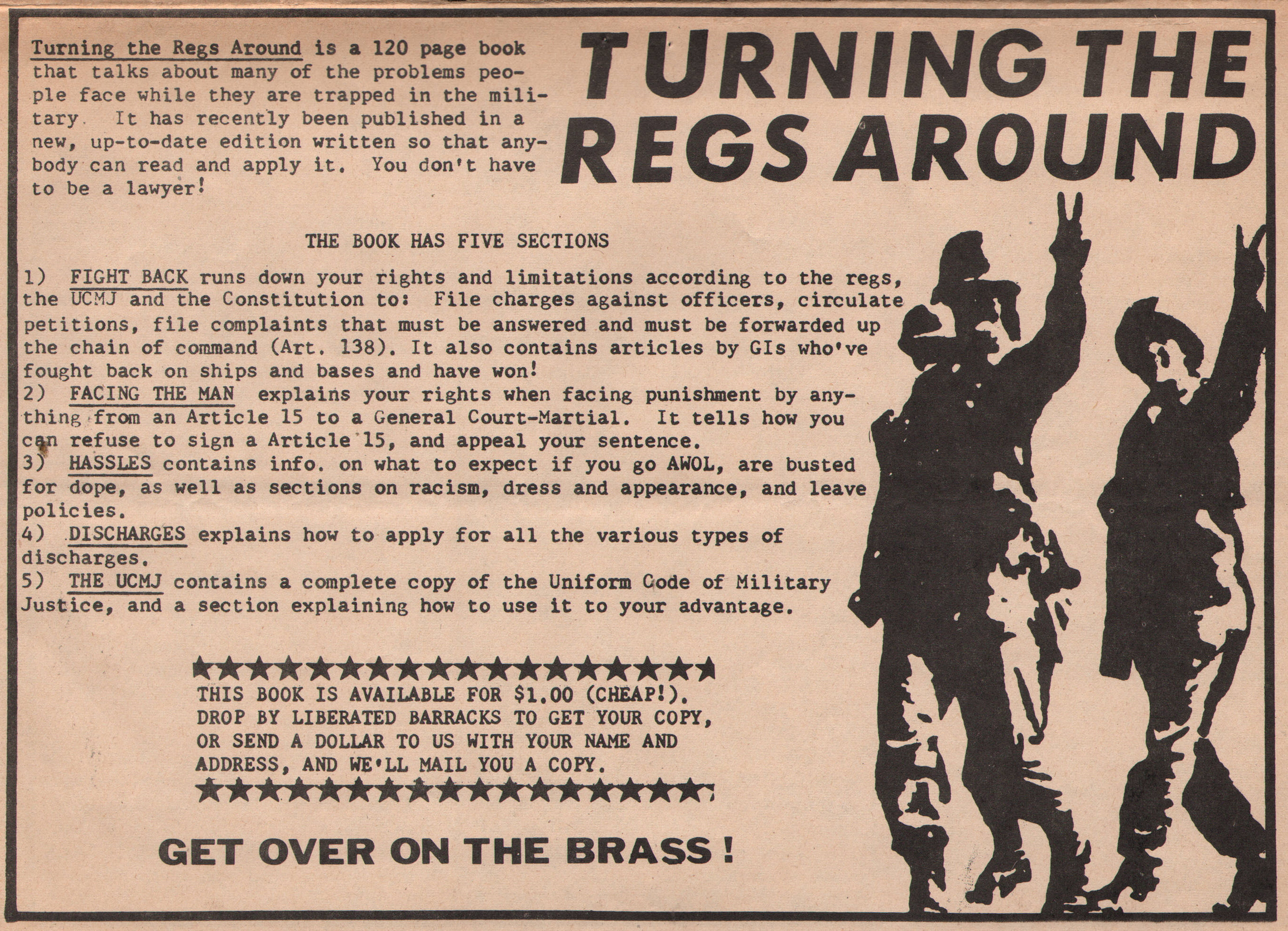
Advertisement in Liberated Barracks for Turning the Regs Around, a pamphlet produced by the Pacific Counseling Service

Liberated Barracks was printed from 1971 to 1974 on an offset press at a residence in Kailua, Hawaii. It was part of a program under the same name maintaining G.I. coffeehouses – the titular "liberated barracks" – near military bases for soldiers to freely discuss topics including the war. The publishers also provided counsel to G.I.s in Hawaii.

Copies of Liberated Barracks were found on ships carrying troops to Vietnam.

== Content ==
Liberated Barracks served two purposes, simultaneously acting as an organ to disseminate statements by those who opposed the war and an avenue to advise and organize those resisters.

One issue of Liberated Barracks included a map created by the organization in collaboration with a local Catholic anti-war group. Titled "Enjoy Hawaii: Home Staging-Ground for the Vietnam War in Indochina", the map depicted military installations in Hawaii and functioned as an effective tool for agitating against the war; it was widely distributed in Hawaii and a copy was reportedly given to Prime Minister Kakuei Tanaka of Japan during his 1972 visit to Honolulu to meet with President Richard Nixon.
