= Ramparts (magazine) =

1962-75 American political publication

- Editor: Warren Hinckle
- Managing editor: James F. Colaianni
- Categories: Political and literary magazine
- Frequency: Quarterly, then monthly
- Publisher: Edward Michael Keating Sr.
- Founder: Edward Michael Keating Sr., Helen English Keating
- Founded: 1962
- Final issue: 1975
- Country: United States
- Based in: Menlo Park, California, U.S.
- Language: English
- OCLC: 24204009

Ramparts was a glossy illustrated American political and literary magazine, published from 1962 to 1975 and closely associated with the New Left political movement. Unlike most of the radical magazines of the day, which were printed on pulp newsprint, Ramparts was expensively produced and graphically sophisticated.

== Establishment ==
Ramparts was established in June 1962 by Edward Michael Keating Sr. in Menlo Park, California, as a "showcase for the creative writer and as a forum for the mature American Catholic". The magazine declared its intent to publish "fiction, poetry, art, criticism and essays of distinction, reflecting those positive principles of the Hellenic-Christian tradition which have shaped and sustained our civilization for the past two thousand years, and which are needed still to guide us in an age grown increasingly secular, bewildered, and afraid".

The founding location was an office space at 1182 Chestnut Street, Menlo Park, California. Edward Keating and his wife Helen (née English) personally financed the magazine. The early magazine included pieces by Thomas Merton and John Howard Griffin, but one observer compared its design to "the poetry annual of a Midwestern girls school".

Under editor Warren Hinckle, the magazine upgraded its look, converted to a monthly news magazine, and moved to San Francisco. It once occupied the historic Colombo Building. Robert Scheer became managing editor, and Dugald Stermer was hired as art director. Former FBI agent William W. Turner was added to the staff of the publication.

In the fall of 1965, Howard Gossage introduced to Hinckle, Frederick C. Mitchell, a Latin America history graduate student at Berkeley, who had inherited money from his grandfather, and invested $100,000 in Ramparts, then, committed another $600,000, and secured loans and debts of around a quarter of a million dollars.

== Activities ==
Ramparts was an early opponent of the Vietnam War. Its April 1966 cover article concerned the Michigan State University Group, a technical assistance program in South Vietnam that Ramparts claimed was a front for CIA covert operations. For that story, Ramparts won the George Polk Award for Magazine Reporting. In August 1966, managing editor James F. Colaianni wrote the first national article denouncing the US use of napalm in that conflict. "The Children of Vietnam", a January 1967 photo-essay by William F. Pepper, depicted some of the injuries inflicted on Vietnamese children by U.S. attacks. That piece led Dr. Martin Luther King Jr. to oppose the war publicly for the first time, and he offered Ramparts the sole rights to publish the text of his speech.

In March 1967, Ramparts revealed links between the CIA and the National Student Association (NSA), raising concerns about CIA involvement in domestic issues. The CIA knew about the revelations in advance, and tried their best to limit the extent of the scandal. Nevertheless, financial clues led to further stories by the press, revealing CIA ties to groups like Radio Free Europe, Radio Liberty and the Asia Foundation. In the estimation of historian John Prados, the ensuing scandal "marked a sea change for the agency".

One of the magazine's most controversial covers depicted the hands of four of its editors holding burning draft cards, with their names clearly visible. Ramparts also covered conspiracy theories about the Kennedy assassination. The magazine published Che Guevara's diaries, with an introduction by Fidel Castro, and the prison diaries of Eldridge Cleaver, later republished as Soul on Ice. Upon his release from prison, Cleaver became a Ramparts staff writer.

The magazine's size and influence grew dramatically over these years. Moving to monthly production, combined subscriptions and newsstand sales increased from just under 100,000 at the end of 1966 to nearly 250,000 in 1968, a figure more than double that of the liberal weekly, The Nation.

Beginning in 1966, American authorities began investigating the magazine's funding, suspecting Soviet financial connections. CIA Director William Raborn asked for a report, and files were gathered on many of the editors and writers. The CIA's targeting of a US publication was a violation of the National Security Act of 1947. The CIA failed to find communist ties.

The magazine also published articles written by Anthony Russo, one of the men involved in the leaking of the Pentagon Papers, about the RAND Corporation.

== Decline ==
Despite its impressive circulation figures, high production and promotional costs made Ramparts operate at a heavy financial loss during the last years of the 1960s, with its operating deficit topping $500,000 a year in both 1967 and 1968. Bankruptcy and a temporary cessation of production followed. The magazine's temporary shift to a biweekly format and an expensive trip to cover the 1968 Democratic National Convention led to financial instability, as did a drop in subscriptions. With a reduced budget and a smaller staff, Ramparts continued publication.

In 1970, contributor Susan Lydon wrote "Understanding Orgasm", published in Ramparts as "The Politics of Orgasm". The male editorial board first laughed at Lydon's proposed article, but she persisted. Upon publication, the article sparked widespread discussion of the fake orgasm, and it was later brought into the scholarly literature about women's sexuality. Ramparts editor Robert Scheer acknowledged "The Politics of Orgasm" as "one of our great articles."

In June 1972, the magazine printed the wiring schematics necessary to create a mute box, to block charges to the calling party, a variant of the blue box. Most of the 50,000 subscribers received copies, however, 90,000 newsstand-destined copies were coerced by operatives of Pacific Bell from distributors under threat of California penal code, section 502.7, avoiding a judicial delay, but causing financial losses to the magazine.

In August 1975, the magazine published its final issue.

== Legacy ==
Several former staffers went on to found their own magazines. Jann Wenner and Ralph J. Gleason founded Rolling Stone in 1967, when Sunday Ramparts folded. Adam Hochschild, Richard Parker, and Paul Jacobs created Mother Jones in 1976. At Scanlan's Monthly, editor Warren Hinckle paired Hunter S. Thompson and illustrator Ralph Steadman for what is widely regarded as the first example of Gonzo journalism. Robert Scheer later became a featured columnist in the Los Angeles Times, edited the Truthdig website, and appeared on the NPR program Left, Right and Center. Another Ramparts editor, James Ridgeway, was a senior correspondent in the Washington, D.C. bureau of Mother Jones.

James F. Colaianni later represented the radical Catholic perspective with the books Married Priests & Married Nuns and The Catholic Left. Three editors, David Horowitz, Sol Stern and Peter Collier, later denounced the left and became critics of liberal progressivism. For a brief time, the magazine's Washington correspondent was Brit Hume, now working for Fox News. Former correspondent Eldridge Cleaver would continue his advocacy of black nationalism until his return to America from exile; from then on, Cleaver identified himself as a conservative Republican and Mormon. Sandra Levinson became a co-founder and executive director of the Center for Cuban Studies, and the founder and curator of the Cuban Art Space gallery.

== Contributors ==
Notable contributors include: Noam Chomsky, Seymour Hersh, Bobby Seale, Tom Hayden, Angela Davis, Susan Sontag, William Greider, Jonathan Kozol, Christopher Hitchens (as Matthew Blaire), Brit Hume, and Reese Erlich.

== In popular culture ==
- The magazine is mentioned in the 1999 film The Insider. In the movie, Lowell Bergman, a former radical journalist with Ramparts magazine who later started working for the CBS, was played by Al Pacino.

== See also ==
- List of underground newspapers of the 1960s counterculture
