= Pacific Counseling Service =

Antiwar GI counseling service organization during the Vietnam War

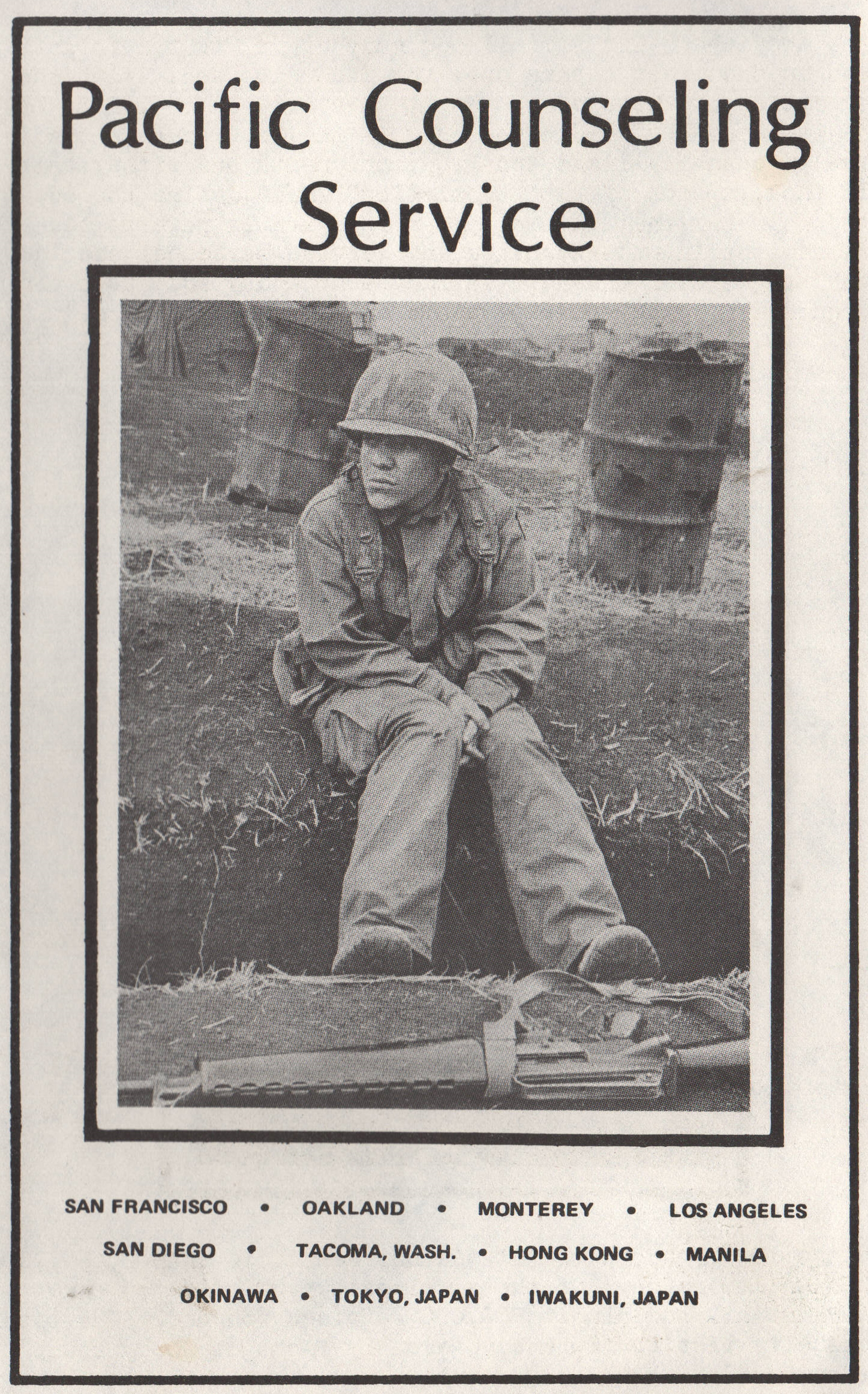
PCS 1971 Pamphlet Cover Page - GI Rights Organization

The Pacific Counseling Service (PCS) was a G.I. counseling service organization created by antiwar activists during the Vietnam War. PCS saw itself as trying to make the U.S. Armed Forces "adhere more closely to regulations concerning conscientious objector discharges and G.I. rights." The Armed Forces Journal, on the other hand, said PCS was involved in "antimilitary activities", including "legal help and incitement to dissident GIs." PCS evolved out of a small GI Help office started by a freshly discharged Air Force Sergeant in San Francisco, California in January 1969. The idea rapidly caught on among antiwar forces and within a year PCS had offices in Monterey, Oakland, and San Diego in California, plus Tacoma, Washington. By 1971 it had spread around the Pacific with additional offices in Los Angeles, Hong Kong, Okinawa, the Philippines, as well as Tokyo and Iwakuni in Japan. Each location was established near a major U.S. military base. At its peak, PCS was counseling hundreds of disgruntled soldiers a week, helping many with legal advice, conscientious objector discharges and more. As the war wound down, ending in 1975, the offices closed with the last office in San Francisco printing its final underground newspaper in 1976.

== Background ==
By 1968 the movement against the Vietnam War was rapidly expanding in the U.S. and around the world, and GI resistance among the soldiers and sailors of the U.S. military was growing. The San Francisco area, where several key U.S. military bases served as launching pads for troops heading to the war zone, was developing into a center for disaffected soldiers, military deserters, and GI protestors. In July 1968, nine military men, from all four branches of the armed forces, publicly refused to go to Vietnam and chained themselves to ministers at St. Andrews Presbyterian Church in Marin City just north of San Francisco. Their arrests, described as "a media spectacle", involved the Military Police entering the church during a Communion service, using bolt cutters to dislodge the protesters, and arresting all nine of the soldiers plus the ministers they were chained to. The incident received international press coverage and served as an early indication of wide spread discontent and antiwar sentiment among soldiers. One of the nine GIs was Air Force Sergeant and radar instructor Oliver Hirsch, who had just escaped in his pajamas from the Presidio Military Stockade where he had been held for a psych evaluation after feigning insanity in an attempt to avoid orders to Vietnam.

== GI Help Office ==
After his arrest, Hirsch, expected an extended stay in Leavenworth military prison, but was instead quickly dishonorably discharged. "I went from facing years in prison . . . to standing on the side of the highway in civilian clothes -- free as a man can be in this country," he told an interviewer years later. Recognizing how difficult it had been to resist the war within the military, he decided there was a pressing need to help other soldiers under similar circumstances. In January 1969 he started the GI Help office in downtown San Francisco as a service to soldiers resisting deployment to Vietnam. This office, in the Mission District at 483 Guerrero Street, was the first of its kind in the U.S. Hirsch had recognized and been an early part of a rapidly expanding expression within the U.S. military of the growing antiwar and anti-military sentiment surrounding the Vietnam War. Military statistics have revealed "there were about 1.5 million AWOLS and 563,000 less-than-honorable discharges between 1964 and 1974." In other words, by 1969 there was a growing and acute need among disaffected GIs for legal counseling and support.

== West Coast Counseling ==
Other antiwar activists soon realized that Hirsch was on to something as many GIs contacted the GI Office asking for help. Sidney Peterman, a Unitarian minister and longtime peace activist in the American Friends Service Committee, along with several other area activists, opened a second office in Monterey, California in March 1969, rebranding the overall project as West Coast Counseling. Peterman had been inspired by the burgeoning G.I. coffeehouse movement which was already convincing antiwar activists of the effectiveness of civilian and student support for GIs in their growing resistance to the military and the war. The new office was right next to the Fort Ord Army Base where 40,000 Army soldiers were being trained for Vietnam. Funding was obtained from pacifist and religious organizations, as well as some Vietnam veterans and conscientious objectors. One of the most active early staffers was Alan Miller, a Presbyterian cleric from Minnesota. By the end of 1969, additional offices were opened in Oakland, San Diego and Tacoma, Washington. The Oakland office was set up near the Oakland Army Base, which in 1970 was the main embarkation point for soldiers being sent to Indochina, often sending more than a thousand a day.

== Expansion to Pacific Counseling Service ==
During 1969, the U.S. began a major tactical shift of U.S. combat operations in Southeast Asia from the ground to the air. As the ground war stalemated and Army grunts increasingly refused to fight or resisted the war in various other ways, the U.S. "turned increasingly to air bombardment". As a result, much of the U.S. war related activity shifted to bases on the West Coast and the chain of U.S. Navy and Air Force bases ringing the Pacific. Recognizing this shift in early 1970, Peterman and other organizers made plans to expand abroad and replaced "West Coast" with "Pacific" becoming the Pacific Counseling Service. Peterman made a two-month tour of possible Asian locations, and Japanese peace activists recalled Peterman appearing at their Tokyo office in March 1970 "wearing black clerical robes that reached to the ankles with a high collar". Peterman returned to Tokyo to open the first Asian office in April 1970. During the last six months of 1970, additional offices were established in Okinawa, Hong Kong, Olongapo City in the Philippines, and in Iwakuni, Japan. An office was also opened in Los Angeles during this period. As of May, 1971, forty full-time staff were working in the eleven PCS projects on the West Coast and in Asia. For short periods of time there were PCS offices in Balibago and Angeles City in the Philippines, Misawa and Yokota Air Bases in Japan, and Honolulu.

== Political evolution ==
The name change signaled more than the organization's expansion around the Pacific. In a 1970 report, PCS activists explained that much of their work was "directed towards the support of non-white GIs." They recognized that "a disproportionately high number of service personnel are…members of the black, brown or third world communities." And nonwhite GIs received "twice as many" courts-martial and non-judicial punishments as white GIs. Just as other left activists of the period were looking beyond the U.S. and taking "inspiration from liberation movements around the world", PCS and other GI movement organizers began to move beyond mainly antiwar politics to embrace "antiracist and anti-imperialist consciousness" and to work towards instilling this among GIs. As they put it in a 1974 pamphlet "our efforts must go beyond the short range goal of ending the war and must focus on building the movement to create a new society." Expanding to Asia, they felt, would allow them to organize GIs overlooked stateside while building alliances between GIs and Asian activists. This expansion also helped them recognize "the Vietnam War as a phase of a larger history of the US empire." To implement this, PCS moved beyond mainly legal counseling and discharge advice to offering a more GI Coffeehouse-like environment where GIs could "talk about politics and society, read underground papers and historical and political books not available on bases," as well as meet young men and women "not part of the rip-off honky-tonk environment" around U.S. bases, particularly in Asia. At the Iwakuni office, PSC organized "rock concerts, camping and beach trips" and helped GIs put out an underground newspaper called Semper Fi. Working together with Japanese antiwar activists they developed slogans such as "Break up the American military system. Stop the war machine!" PCS was also instrumental in establishing a women's center in Okanawa, which reflected the growing understanding of women's issues within the progressive movements of the times. The Women's House, "became a center for living, counseling, consciousness-raising groups, and formulating actions and solutions to common problems." And "was the only place of its kind serving the needs of women in the military, military wives and daughters (over 35,000 in Okinawa alone), women employed by the DOD, civilian women working with the GI projects, and Asian women whose work ties them to U.S. bases as baseworkers, prostitutes, and maids." PCS published a women's journal at two of its Asian offices.

== National Lawyers Guild ==
From its very early days PCS recognized the need for additional legal help when issues of law were involved. Non-legal counselors could offer advice, support and community, but when more serious questions of military or civilian law arose, actual lawyers were needed. The National Lawyers Guild provided many of the attorneys who volunteered to help, advise and defend GIs. Often the NLG would establish an office next door or in the same building as PCS, with the first of these being in Monterey in 1970 and the second in San Francisco in 1971. All PCS offices received help at one time or another from the NLG and several Guild attorneys became regular PCS advisors. As PCS expanded around the Pacific region, the Guild opened offices in the Philippines, Japan and Okinawa, "offering free legal counsel to hundreds of G.I.’s opposed to the Vietnam War." A Congressional Investigation into radical activity among GIs looked into the NLG's Southeastern Asian GI movement project and reported it "working with PCS at four PCS facilities in Japan." Investigators also reported that "NLG representatives" conducted workshops outside Clark Air Force Base in the Philippians "on such subjects as conscientious objector claims, UCMJ Article 138 complaints, and dissent activities in general." They also noted the use of a local GI underground newspaper, Cry Out, to advertise legal services.

== Turning the Regs Around ==
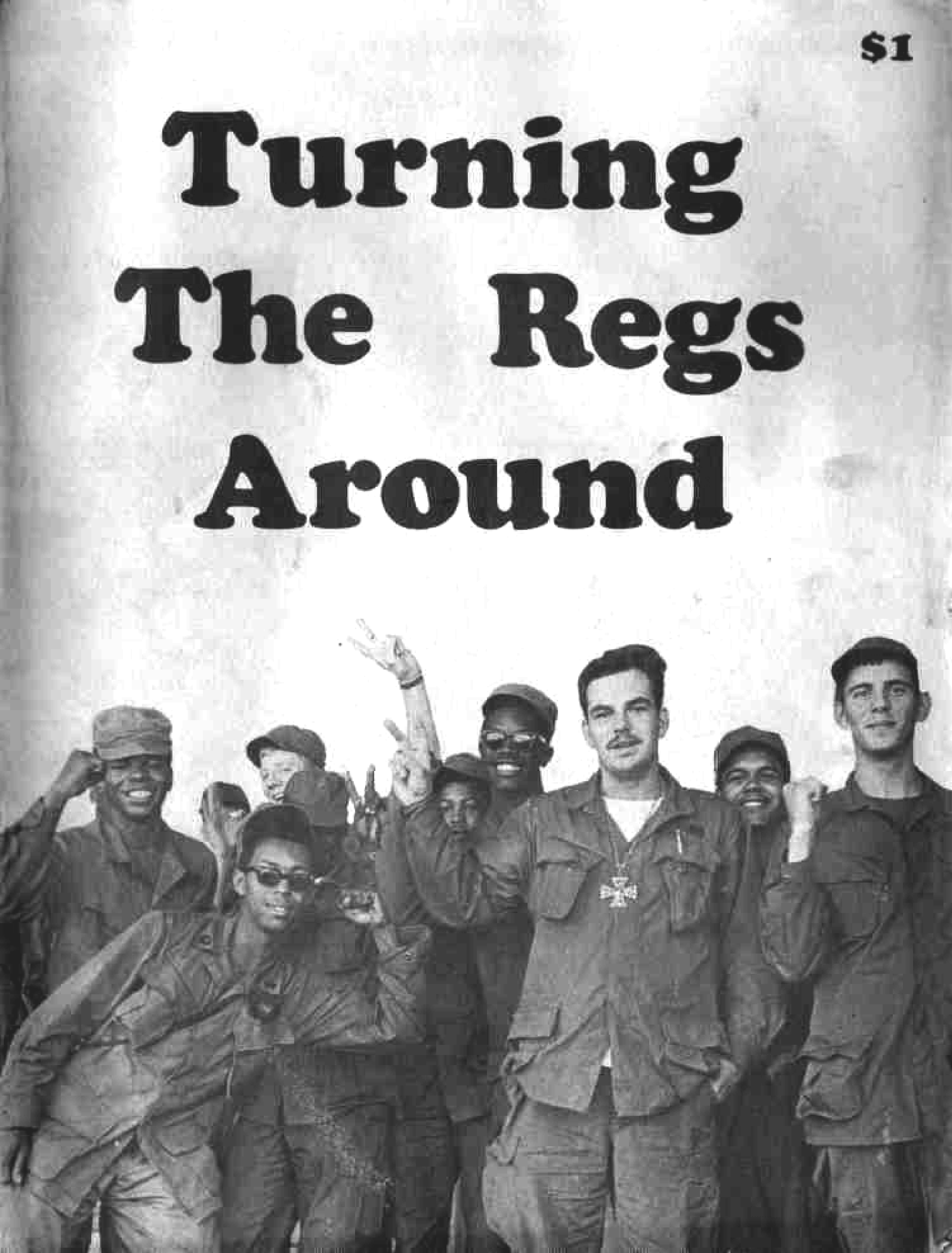
Turning the Regs Around Cover Page 1973 Edition

In 1972, PCS was instrumental in creating an influential pamphlet about GI counseling and organizing. Known officially as Turning the Regs Around: A Handbook on Military Law and Counseling, An Aid to Organizing for GIs and Civilians it started out as the handbook for a class on military counseling given in San Francisco to 40 or 50 GIs and civilians. It was written by Nancy Hausch, a PCS staffer, who described its purpose: "Teaching people how to stay on top of the military machine by knowing and using the various legal tools ordinarily used to keep them down, is a very important part of the struggle." The initial pamphlet was so popular in the GI movement that within a year a second improved longer edition (124 pages) was released by The Bay Area Turning The Regs Around Committee. The handbook covered everything from correspondence with Congress to filing charges against officers to courts-martial, and explained GI rights to demonstrate and exercise their freedom of speech. It applied to all branches of the military and was written "so that anybody can read and apply it, not just lawyers." It also cautioned that the knowledge in the handbook couldn't "stop the brass from using their power to harass, exploit and oppress enlisted people"; that it was "only one helpful tool in a long and difficult fight." During the Vietnam War, the handbook could be found in GI coffeehouses and counseling centers around the world, as well as smuggled onto military bases and ships, and was frequently reprinted, excerpted and cited wherever GI resistance emerged. One GI counseling project called the pamphlet its "biggest seller" and said they were "going faster than a speeding bullet."

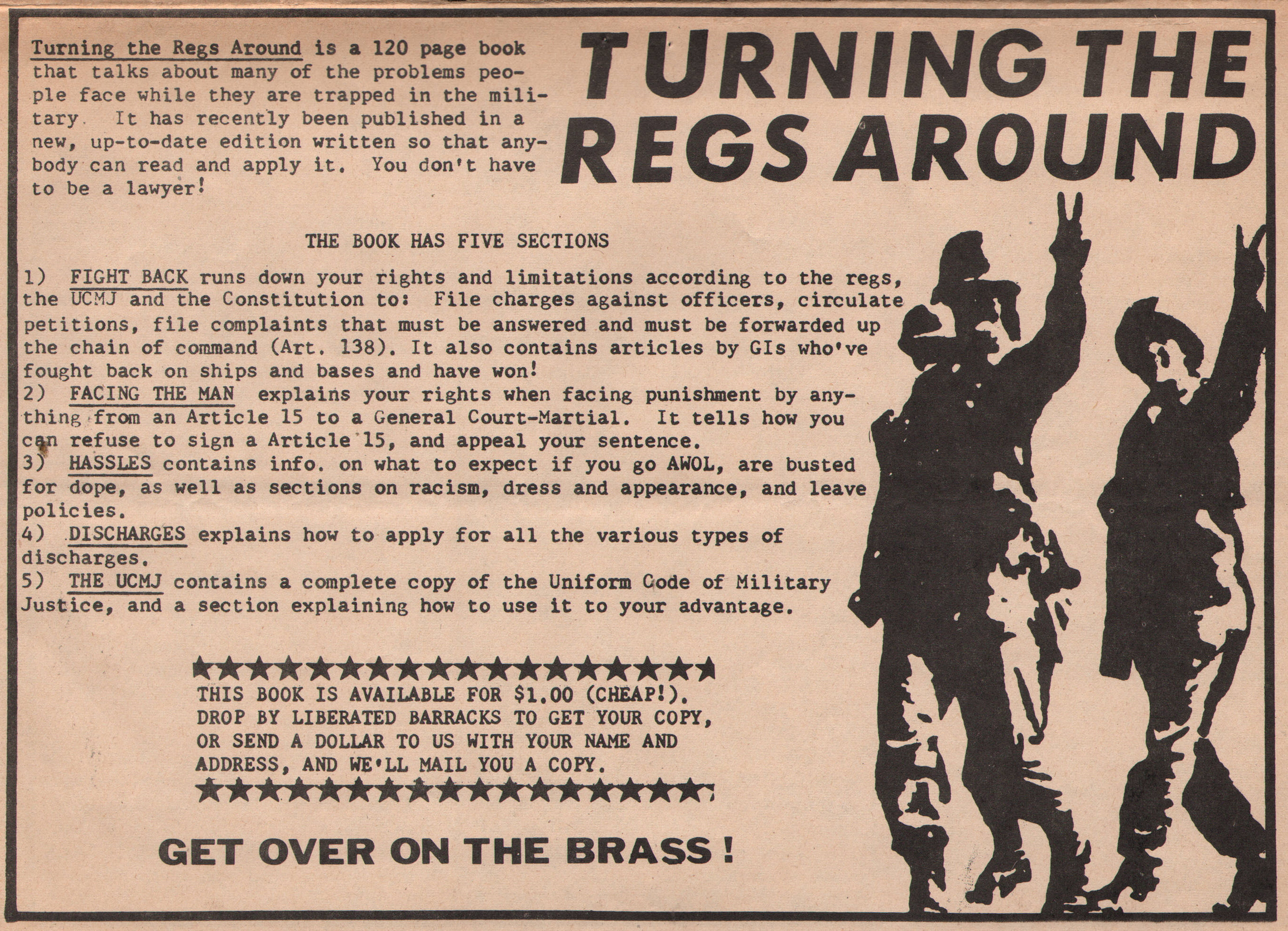
Turning the Regs Around ad in the Liberated Barracks GI underground newspaper, Oct 1973 Issue

== Impact ==
Within the first six months of the opening of the Monterey office, the organizers "handled more than seven hundred legal cases involving GI rights, and helped 120 soldiers obtain ‘conscientious objector’ status." In early 1970 Oakland PCS activists began extensive leafleting of area airports informing incoming soldiers of their right to file for conscientious objector status, which at the time, automatically delayed overseas orders. By March that year, "twelve hundred men had successfully delayed their orders" through this process. In response, the Pentagon issued a special change in regulations for West Coast bases forbidding C.O. applications during transit to Vietnam forcing GIs to wait until they arrived. In Japan, PCS started by providing legal assistance to a number of U.S. military deserters. From about 1965 to 1970, there was an alliance between unhappy U.S. GIs and Japanese antiwar groups. By some estimates, Japanese activists helped "two to three hundred GIs" go underground in Japan during that period, but improved cooperation between the U.S. agents and Japanese detectives made this increasingly difficult. PCS stepped into this breach by offering GIs advice and counseling about legal avenues to resist or exit the military. PCS was also instrumental in helping the highly successful FTA Show come to several U.S. military bases in the Asia-Pacific region, including in the Philippines, Japan, and Okinawa. The show, an anti-Vietnam War road show for GIs starring Jane Fonda, Donald Sutherland and a number of other entertainers, was very popular with GIs everywhere it went. PCS provided show organizers with local contacts and helped spread the word to the many GIs who came to the shows. The historical evidence indicates that over its lifetime, PCS counseled and supported many thousands of disgruntled and antiwar GIs, many of whom found ways out of the military or to avoid combat. The military conducted extensive undercover investigations and surveillance of PCS as revealed in days of hearings and testimony by the House Committee on Internal Security, and reported that "numerous military personnel are known to have sought the support or assistance of the organization." The U.S. military was so concerned about PCS/NLG activities in the Philippines that in 1972 Naval commanders provided information to the new martial law regime of Ferdinand Marcos which led to the arrest, interrogation and deportation of several PCS/NLG staff, effectively bringing an end to PCS activities in the country.

== See also ==
- A Matter of Conscience
- Brian Willson
- Concerned Officers Movement
- Court-martial of Howard Levy
- Court-martial of Susan Schnall
- Donald W. Duncan, Master Sergeant U.S. Army Special Forces early register to the Vietnam War
- Fort Hood Three
- GI Underground Press
- G.I. Coffeehouses
- GI's Against Fascism
- Movement for a Democratic Military
- Opposition to United States involvement in the Vietnam War
- Presidio mutiny
- Sir! No Sir!, a documentary about the anti-war movement within the ranks of the United States Armed Forces
- Stop Our Ship (SOS) anti-Vietnam War movement in and around the U.S. Navy
- Veterans For Peace
- Vietnam Veterans Against the War
- Waging Peace in Vietnam
- Winter Soldier Investigation
