= Cal Pritner =

Calvin Pritner (1935 - December 1, 2014), was an educator, writer, administrator, and actor. He chaired two university theatre departments (University of Missouri-Kansas City, 1994–2000) and Illinois State University (1970–1981), and he was the founding artistic director of the Illinois Shakespeare Festival (1978–1990). He is an elected Fellow of the College of Fellows of the American Theatre.

He is the author and co-author of three instructional television series on Shakespeare and poetry; he co-authored Page to Stage: Julius Caesar, which won the Wilbur Schramm award as best American instructional series of 1991. With Louis Colaianni he co-authored How to Speak Shakespeare (2001), and with Scott Walters he co-authored Introduction to Play Analysis (2004). Both books are used widely as textbooks in colleges and universities. He is the author of Mark Twain and Me Unlearning Racism (2021).

Pritner earned membership in the American actors' unions: Actors Equity Association, Screen Actors Guild, and the American Federation of Television and Radio Artists. He has appeared in several episodic television series, played leading roles in Shakespeare, and he had a featured role in Robert Altman's film, Kansas City. In addition, he has performed five one-person shows, two of which he authored and toured, Mark Twain Traveling and Mark Twain Unlearning Racism.

Students from the Illinois State University Department of Theatre, which Pritner served as founding department chair, include: a majority of the founding members of Chicago's Steppenwolf Theatre Ensemble; Tony winners Judith Ivey and Rondi Reed; Oscar nominee John Malkovich; former Steppenwolf Theatre artistic directors Terry Kinney, Jeff Perry, and Randy Arney; and film and television stars Gary Cole and Jane Lynch.

Cal Pritner a long-time cancer survivor, died December 1, 2014.

== Filmography ==
- The Awakening Land (1978) (Herron, as Calvin Pritner) (Part 2: The Fields)
- Hunter (1984) (1985) (Deputy Chief Kazerowsky) (Rape and Revenge: Pt. 1)
- The A-Team (1985) (Miller) (Mind Games)
- Kansas City (1996) (Governor Park)
