= Eldridge Cleaver =

American activist (1935–1998)

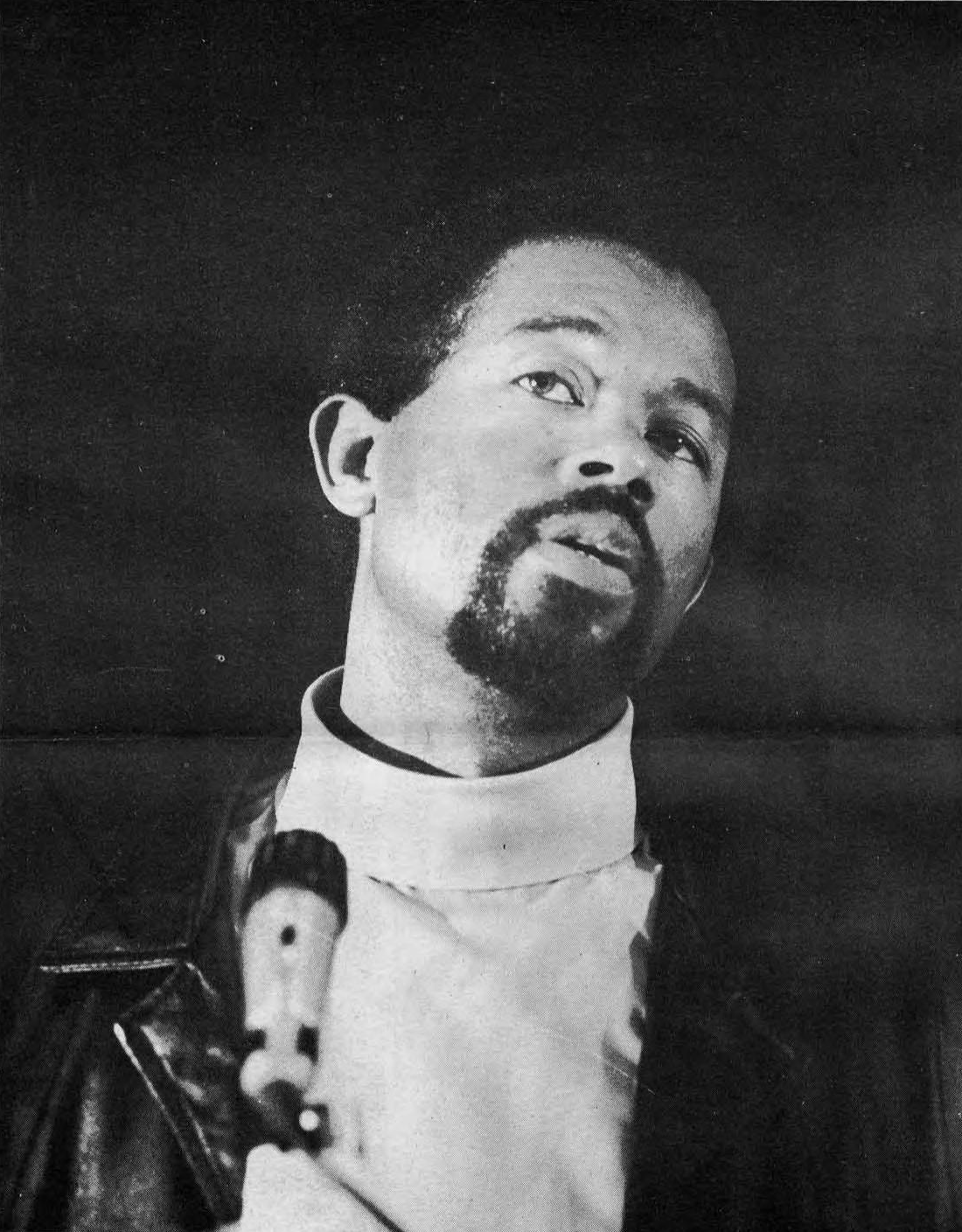
- Cleaver in 1968
- Born: Leroy Eldridge Cleaver; August 31, 1935; Wabbaseka, Arkansas, U.S.
- Died: May 1, 1998 (aged 62); Pomona, California, U.S.
- Other name: "El Rage"
- Occupations: Writer, political activist
- Political party: Black Panther (1967–1971); Peace and Freedom (1968); Republican (1980s)
- Movement: Black Power Movement; Civil Rights Movement
- Spouse: Kathleen Cleaver (m. 1967; div. 1987)
- Children: 2

Leroy Eldridge Cleaver (August 31, 1935 – May 1, 1998) was an African American writer and political activist. He was an early leader of the Black Panther Party, serving as Minister of Information and, while in exile, head of the International Section of the Panthers. As editor of the official Panthers' newspaper, The Black Panther, Cleaver's influence on the direction of the party was rivaled only by founders Huey P. Newton and Bobby Seale.

In 1958, Cleaver was convicted of a series of crimes including assault and attempted murder, and he eventually served time in Folsom and San Quentin prisons before being released on parole in 1966. Cleaver read widely in prison and began writing. His work was noticed by Edward Keating of Ramparts, who advocated for his release and published his prison essays. Upon Cleaver's release in 1966, Keating hired him to work for Ramparts and he began his work with the Panthers. In 1968, Cleaver published Soul on Ice, a collection of essays that was met with both praise and condemnation due to its searing commentary on American society and its provocative assertions. Most notoriously, Cleaver admits (with regret) to raping multiple women prior to his incarceration. That same year, he became a fugitive after wounding two Oakland police officers in an ambush, during which Cleaver was wounded and fellow Black Panther Bobby Hutton was killed. Cleaver and Newton subsequently fell out with each other, resulting in a split that weakened the party.

After spending seven years in exile in Cuba, Algeria, and France, Cleaver returned to the U.S. in 1975. He designed provocative clothes for men and later became involved in various religious groups (the Unification Church and the Collegiate Association for the Research of Principles) before joining the Church of Jesus Christ of Latter-day Saints and becoming a conservative Republican.

== Biography ==
=== Early life ===
Eldridge Cleaver was born on August 31, 1935, in Wabbaseka, Arkansas. As a child he moved with his large family to Phoenix and then to Los Angeles. He was the son of Leroy Cleaver and Thelma Hattie Robinson. He had four siblings: Wilhelima Marie, Helen Grace, James Weldon, and Theophilus Henry. Both of his grandfathers were Protestant preachers.

As a teenager, he was involved in petty crime and served time in youth detention centers. At the age of 18, he was convicted of a felony drug charge for marijuana and sent to the adult prison at Soledad. In 1958, he was convicted of assault and assault with intent to murder, and was incarcerated in Folsom and San Quentin prisons, where he became radicalized. He received a copy of The Communist Manifesto and read widely in economics, philosophy, literature and political theory. He joined the Nation of Islam (NOI) and led a radical faction of San Quentin's Black Muslims. Cleaver grew dissatisfied with the NOI and left it at roughly the same time that Malcolm X had his publicized rift with Elijah Muhammad and formed the Organization of Afro-American Unity (OAAU).

Cleaver was paroled from San Quentin on December 12, 1966, with a discharge date of March 20, 1971. His parole was granted with the help of Edward Michael Keating, founder of Ramparts magazine, who had started publishing Cleaver's prison essays in June 1966 and guaranteed him a job in the magazine's San Francisco office.

=== Black Panther Party ===
Upon his release, Cleaver continued writing for Ramparts and was also involved in efforts to revitalize the OAAU. The Black Panther Party (BPP) was then only two months old. Cleaver joined the Oakland-based BPP, serving as Minister of Information, or spokesperson. What initially attracted him to the Panthers, as opposed to other radical groups, was the BPP's commitment to armed struggle.

In 1967, he, along with Marvin X, Ed Bullins, and Ethna Wyatt, formed the Black House political/cultural center in San Francisco. Amiri Baraka, Sonia Sanchez, Askia Toure, Sarah Webster Fabio, Art Ensemble of Chicago, Avotcja, Reginald Lockett, Emory Douglas, Samuel Napier, Bobby Hutton, Huey Newton, and Bobby Seale were Black House regulars. In 1967, he married Kathleen Neal Cleaver. They had two children, Ahmad Maceo Eldridge, born 1969; and a daughter, Joju Younghi, born July 31, 1970.

In 1968, Cleaver was arrested on violation of parole by association with individual(s) of bad reputation, and control and possession of firearms. He petitioned for habeas corpus to the Solano County Court, and was granted it along with a release of a $50,000 bail.

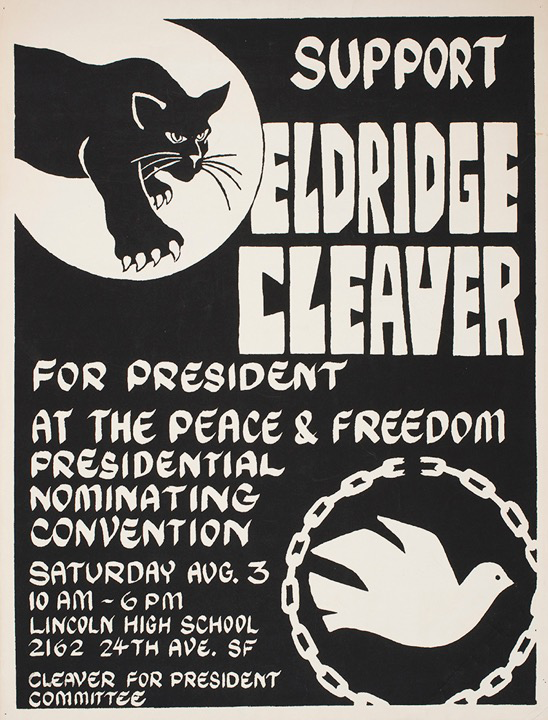
A poster from Cleaver's 1968 presidential run

Cleaver was a presidential candidate in 1968 on the ticket of the Peace and Freedom Party, beating out Dick Gregory for the nomination at the party's national nominating convention. Having been born on August 31, 1935, he would not have been the requisite 35 years of age until more than a year after Inauguration Day 1969. Although the Constitution requires the president to be at least 35 years of age, it does not specify whether the age must be reached at the time of nomination, election, or inauguration. Courts in Hawaii and New York held that Cleaver could be excluded from the ballot because he did not meet the Constitutional criteria.

In the aftermath of the assassination of Martin Luther King Jr. on April 4, 1968, there were riots across the nation. On April 6, Cleaver and 14 other Panthers were involved in an ambush with Oakland police officers, during which two of the officers were wounded as Cleaver and the other Panthers opened fire. They were armed with M16 rifles and shotguns. Cleaver was wounded during the ambush and 17-year-old Panther Bobby Hutton was killed.

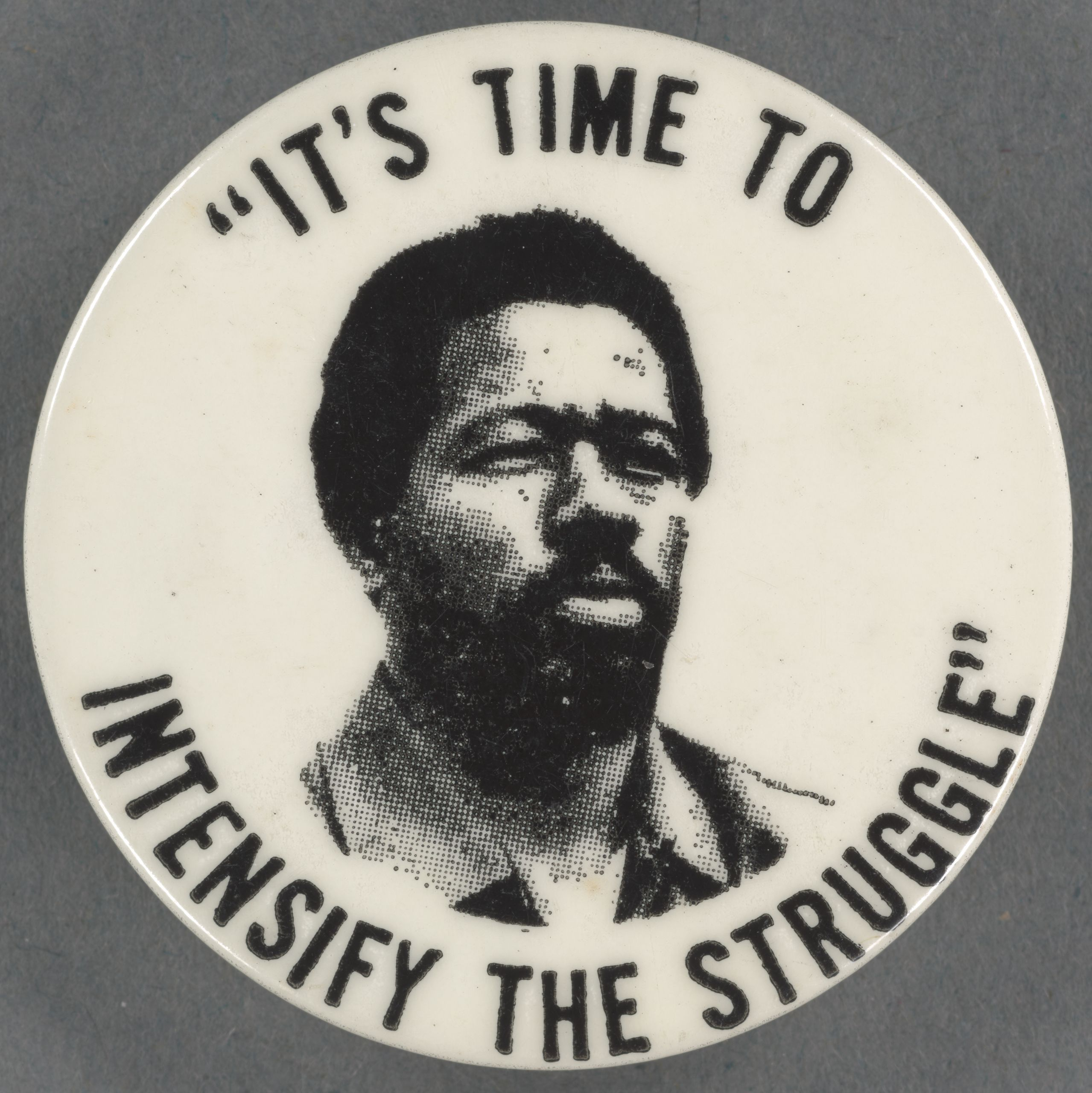
A button featuring Eldridge Cleaver and the slogan, "It's Time to Intensify the Struggle"

Charged with attempted murder after the incident, Cleaver jumped bail to flee to Cuba in late 1968. Initially treated with hospitality by the Cuban government, this ended with reports that Fidel Castro had received information of the CIA infiltrating the Black Panther Party. Cleaver then decided to head to Algeria, sending word to his wife to meet him there. Elaine Klein normalized his immigration status by getting him an invitation to attend the Pan-African Cultural festival, rendering him temporarily safe from prosecution.

The festival allowed him to network with revolutionaries from all over Africa in order to discuss the perils of white supremacy and colonialism. Cleaver was outspoken in his call for violence against the United States, contributing to his mission to "position the Panthers within the revolutionary nationalist camp inside the United States and as disciples of Fanon on the world stage". Cleaver had set up an international office for the Black Panthers in Algeria. Following Timothy Leary's Weather Underground-assisted prison escape, Leary stayed with Cleaver in Algiers; however, Cleaver placed Leary under "revolutionary arrest" as a counter-revolutionary for promoting drug use.

In 1969, Cleaver cultivated an alliance with the Democratic People's Republic of Korea (DPRK), better known as North Korea, and BPP publications began reprinting excerpts from Kim Il Sung's writings. Although leftists of the time often looked to Cuba, China, and North Vietnam for inspiration, few had paid any attention to the secretive Pyongyang regime. Bypassing U.S. travel restrictions on North Korea, Cleaver and other BPP members made two visits to North Korea in 1969–1970 with the idea that the juche model could be adapted to the revolutionary liberation of African-Americans. Taken on an official tour of the country, Cleaver expressed admiration at "the DPRK's stable, crime-free society which provided guaranteed food, employment, and housing for all, and which had no economic or social inequalities". Following Cleaver's expulsion from the Black Panthers in 1972, the group's ties with North Korea were quickly forgotten.

In the summer of 1970, Cleaver traveled to China as part a U.S. People's Anti-Imperialist Delegation along with another prominent party member, Elaine Brown.

Byron Vaughn Booth, former Panther Deputy Minister of Defense, claimed that, after a trip to North Korea, Cleaver discovered that his wife had been having an affair with Clinton Robert Smith Jr., a fellow Black Panther. Booth told the FBI that he witnessed Cleaver shoot and kill Smith with an AK-47 in Algeria. Elaine Mokhtefi, in the London Review of Books, writes that Cleaver confessed to the murder to her shortly after committing it.

In his 1978 book Soul on Fire, Cleaver made several claims regarding his exile in Algeria, including that he was supported by regular stipends from the government of North Vietnam, which the United States was then at war with. Cleaver stated that he was followed by other former criminals turned revolutionaries, many of whom, including Booth and Smith, hijacked planes to get to Algeria.

=== Split and new directions ===
Cleaver and Newton eventually had a disagreement over the necessity of armed struggle as a response to COINTELPRO and other actions by the government against the Black Panthers and other radical groups, which led to Cleaver's eventual expulsion from the BPP. Also Cleaver's interest in North Korea and global anti-imperialist struggle drew ire from other BPP members who felt that he was neglecting the needs of African-Americans at home in the U.S. On March 6, 1972, Newton formally expelled Cleaver after Cleaver called upon the Black Panthers to expel party chief of staff David Hilliard, who had assumed a leadership role while Newton and others were in prison.

Cleaver advocated the escalation of armed resistance into urban guerrilla warfare, while Newton suggested the best way to respond was to put down the gun, which he felt alienated the Panthers from the rest of the black community, and focus on more pragmatic reformist activity by lobbying for increased social programs to aid African-American communities and anti-discrimination laws. Cleaver accused Newton of being an Uncle Tom for choosing to cooperate with white interests rather than overthrow them. The Black Liberation Army took up Cleaver's call for armed struggle.

=== Fashion design ===
In 1972, Cleaver left Algeria, moving to Paris, France, becoming a born again Christian during time in isolation living underground. He turned his hand to fashion design. Three years later, he released codpiece-revival "virility pants" that he called "the Cleavers", enthusing that they would give men "a chance to assert their masculinity". Cleaver returned to the United States in 1975 to face the unresolved attempted murder charge. Bayard Rustin was the chairman of the Eldridge Cleaver Defense Fund committee, which also included A. Philip Randolph, Nat Hentoff and Dorothy Height, head of the National Council of Negro Women, among others. In 1976, Cleaver told the New York Times that he and his wife were baptized evangelical members of the Word of Life International Church.

By September 1978, out on bail as the proceedings dragged on, he incorporated Eldridge Cleaver Ltd. He ran a factory and a West Hollywood shop, selling his "Cleavers", which he claimed liberated men from "penis binding". He saw no conflict between this and his newfound Christianity, drawing support for his overtly sexual design from Deuteronomy 22. Cleaver told Newsweek, "Clothing is an extension of the fig leaf -- it put our sex inside our bodies. My pants put sex back where it should be.'' The long-outstanding charge was subsequently resolved on a plea bargain reducing it to assault.

=== Later life ===
By the 1980s, Cleaver had become a conservative Republican. He appeared at Republican events and spoke at a California Republican State Central Committee meeting regarding his political transformation. In 1984, he ran for election to the Berkeley City Council but lost. Undaunted, he promoted his candidacy in the Republican Party primary for the 1986 Senate race but was again defeated. In 1987, his 20-year marriage to Kathleen Neal Cleaver came to an end.

In 1980, he claimed that he had led the Panther group on a deliberate ambush in 1968, thus provoking the shootout that killed Hutton.

Some reporters were surprised by this move, because it was in the context of an uncharacteristic speech in which Cleaver also discredited the Black Panthers, stating, "we need police as heroes", and said that he denounced civilian review boards of police shootings for the "bizarre" reason that "it is a rubber stamp for murder". Some speculated Cleaver's admission could have been a pay-off to the Alameda County justice system, whose judge had only days earlier let him avoid prison time; Cleaver was sentenced to community service after getting charged with three counts of assault against three Oakland police officers.

Cleaver later became disillusioned with what he saw as the commercial nature of evangelical Christianity and examined alternatives, including Sun Myung Moon's campus ministry organization CARP. He was also Catholic for a time. He later led a short-lived revivalist ministry called Eldridge Cleaver Crusades, "a hybrid synthesis of Islam and Christianity he called 'Christlam'", along with an auxiliary called the "Guardians of the Sperm".

Cleaver was then baptized into the Church of Jesus Christ of Latter-day Saints (LDS Church) on December 11, 1983. He periodically attended regular services and lectured by invitation at LDS gatherings.

In 1988, Cleaver was placed on probation for burglary and was briefly jailed later in the year after testing positive for cocaine. In 1990, he entered drug rehabilitation for a stated crack cocaine addiction. In 1992 and 1994, he was arrested for drug possession by Oakland and Berkeley police. Shortly after his final arrest, he moved to Southern California, falling into poor health.

=== Death ===
Cleaver died at age 62 on May 1, 1998, at Pomona Valley Hospital Medical Center in Pomona, California. The family announced his cause of death as heart attack at his memorial service at University of LaVerne, where he was employed as a lecturer and diversity consultant at the time of his death. He is buried at Mountain View Cemetery in Altadena, California.

== Soul on Ice (1968) ==
From my prison cell, I have watched America slowly coming awake. It is not fully awake yet, but there is soul in the air and everywhere I see beauty. I have watched the sit-ins, the freedom rides[,] the Mississippi Blood Summers, demonstrations all over the country, the F.S.M. movement, the teach-ins, and the mounting protest over Lyndon Strangelove’s foreign policy —all of this, the thousands of little details, show me it is time to straighten up and fly right. That is why I decided to concentrate on my writings and efforts in this area. We are a very sick country —I, perhaps, am sicker than most. But I accept that. I told you in the beginning that I am extremist by nature —so it is only right that I should be extremely sick. I was very familiar with the Eldridge who came to prison, but that Eldridge no longer exists. And the one I am now is in some ways a stranger to me.

— Eldridge Cleaver, Soul on Ice, 1968

While in prison, he wrote a number of philosophical and political essays, first published in Ramparts magazine and then in book form as Soul on Ice.

In the most controversial part of the book, Cleaver acknowledges committing acts of rape, stating that he initially raped black women in the ghetto "for practice" and then embarked on the serial rape of white women. He described these crimes as politically inspired, motivated by a genuine conviction that the rape of white women was "an insurrectionary act". When he began writing Soul on Ice, he unequivocally renounced rape and all his previous reasoning about it.

I had gone astray—astray not so much from the white man’s law as from being human, civilized—for I could not approve the act of rape. Even though I had some insight into my own motivations, I did not feel justified. I lost my self-respect. My pride as a man dissolved and my whole fragile moral structure seemed to collapse, completely shattered. That is why I started to write. To save myself.

— Eldridge Cleaver, Soul on Ice

Despite these controversial admissions, the book was praised by The New York Times Book Review as "brilliant and revealing".

The essays in Soul on Ice are divided into four thematic sections: "Letters from Prison", describing Cleaver's experiences with and thoughts on crime and prisons; "Blood of the Beast", discussing race relations and promoting black liberation ideology; "Prelude to Love – Three Letters", love letters written to Cleaver's attorney, Beverly Axelrod; and "White Woman, Black Man", on gender relations, black masculinity, and sexuality.

== Books ==
- Cleaver, Eldridge (1968). Soul on Ice. New York: McGraw-Hill Book Company. ISBN 0070113076.
- Cleaver, Eldridge (1969). Scheer, Robert (ed.). Eldridge Cleaver: Post-Prison Writings and Speeches. New York: Random House. ISBN 0-3944-2323-2.
- Il-Sŏng, Kim; Cleaver, Eldridge (Foreword) (1972). Li, Yuk-Sa (ed.). JUCHE! The Speeches and Writings of Kim Il Sung. New York: Grossman Publishers. ISBN 9780670410118.
- Cleaver, Eldridge (1978). Soul on Fire. Waco, Texas: Word Books. ISBN 0-8499-0046-8.
- Cleaver, Eldridge (2006). Cleaver, Kathleen (ed.). Target Zero: A Life in Writing. New York: Palgrave Macmillan. ISBN 1-4039-6237-5.

== See also ==
- Revolutionary activities in Algeria

Preceded by None	Peace and Freedom nominee for President of the United States; 1968	Succeeded by Benjamin Spock
