= James Colaianni =

American lawyer

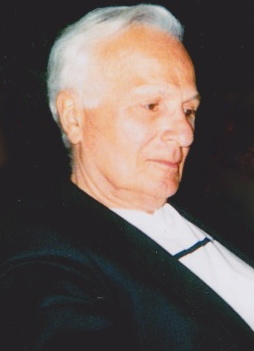
James F. Colaianni

James F. Colaianni (August 6, 1922 – October 5, 2016) was an American Catholic lay theologian, author, publisher, lawyer, and activist.

== Early life ==
He was born in Paterson, New Jersey in 1922. In 1939, Colaianni graduated from St. Joseph’s High School in Paterson, NJ and attended Seton Hall University. Colaianni served in the US Army during World War II in North Africa, Italy, France and Germany, attaining the rank of technical sergeant. Following his honorable discharge, his subsequent antiwar convictions began to emerge.

== Career ==
Colaianni was admitted to the New Jersey Bar in 1948 after attending John Marshall School of Law. While in law school, he coached high school basketball and won a state championship. In the same period, he produced a series of widely publicized debates between William F. Buckley Jr. of National Review, and William Clancy of the liberal Catholic magazine Commonweal.

He earned his master's degree in Theology from the Institute of Lay Theology (ILT), based at the University of San Francisco, in 1963. As a member of the ILT, he served as Adult Religious Education Director from 1963 to 1965 at our Lady of Mount Carmel Catholic parish in Redwood City, California.

He was Managing Editor, Associate Publisher and Religion Editor of Ramparts Magazine from 1965 to 1967. In the August 1966 issue of Ramparts, Colaianni's article, "Napalm: Small Town Diary," documented resistance to the establishment of a napalm plant in Redwood City. It was the first article in the national press to condemn the manufacture and use of napalm in the Vietnam War. Colaianni led a protest of thousands against the use of napalm as a military weapon in Vietnam. He made national news as a spokesperson for the anti-napalm and anti-war movements, appearing on such programs as the NBC Nightly News with Walter Cronkite and the "Huntley-Brinkley Report."

Colaianni advocated the abolition of mandatory celibacy in the priesthood of the Catholic Church in his book Married Priests & Married Nuns (McGraw Hill). Another book, The Catholic Left: The Crisis of Radicalism in the Church (Chilton Publishing), is a study of the phenomenon of liberalism in the Catholic Church in America. Colaianni served as Executive Director of the National Liturgical Conference, Washington D.C. from 1967 to 1970. In that capacity, he produced one of the first "rock masses" on the national scene, featuring Minnie Riperton and the Rotary Connection, at the Liturgical Conference National Convention, Milwaukee Arena, in 1969, with thousands attending.

Beginning in 1970, Colaianni was publisher and principal author of Sunday Sermons, specializing in resource material for the preaching clergy, with worldwide distribution. As of 2006, Colaianni had written more than 2,000 sermons on a wide range of topics, many of which have been anthologized. He was also publisher of the Manual of Clinical Nutrition, 1985, and the journal Clinical Nutrition, edited by Dr. David M. Paige of Johns Hopkins University Medical School. They were distributed internationally to physicians and other health-care providers. He also published the Public Domain Report "Music Bibles and Public Domain Report newsletter 1993-1998, the first publication to catalog literary works, musical compositions, films, and works of visual arts as they entered the US public domain. The publication was edited by Scott A. Johnson, Colaianni's grandson. Sunday Sermons is currently published by James F. Colaianni, Jr.

== Family ==
In 1950, Colaianni married Patricia Kelly Colaianni, the senior editor of his publishing company, Sunday Sermons. They had six children: Karen, Janice, Pamela, James, Louis and John.

== Later life ==
With New York City-Village Gate's Art D'Lugoff, Colaianni was a co-producer of the musical One Mo’ Time at the Village Gate North, in Toronto, Ontario, Canada. He was the sole producer of Jazz America at the historic Warner Theatre, Washington, D.C.

He died at his home in Galloway, New Jersey, at 94.

== See also ==
- Priest shortage
- List of peace activists
