= Demazière =

Demazière may refer to:

- 9641 Demazière, a main belt asteroid.
- Didier Demazière, a French sociologist.
- Martine De Mazière (born 1960), Belgian atmospheric scientist, namesake of the asteroid.

== See also ==
- Mazière
