= Mazière =

Mazière and Mazières (French pronunciation: [ma.zjɛʁ]) are French surnames. It may refer to:

== Mazière ==
- Alice La Mazière (1880-1962), French journalist
- Christian de La Mazière (1922–2006), French journalist and World War II collaborator
- Didier Demazière, French sociologist
- Francis Mazière (1924–1994), French archaeologist
- Joseph Benoit de Mazière (died 1824), French Hebrew scholar at Collegium Trilingue
- Martine De Mazière (born 1960), Belgian atmospheric scientist
- Pierre Mazière (1847–1928), French politician
- Simon Mazière (1655–1722), French sculptor

== Mazières ==
- François de Mazières (born 1960), French politician

== See also ==
- Demazière (disambiguation)
- De Maizière family
- Mazières, a former commune in southwestern France
