= Hélène Cuenat =

French political activist (1931–2022)

- Born: February 3, 1931; Strasbourg, France
- Died: May 18, 2022 (aged 91); Noisy-le-Grand, France
- Occupations: Anti-colonial activist, Educator

Hélène Cuenat (3 February 1931 – 18 May 2022) was a French anti-colonial activist, known as a "suitcase carrier" and member of the Jeanson network in support of the Algerian National Liberation Front (FLN). She was among the escapees from the La Roquette prison in 1961.

== Biography ==
Hélène Cuenat was born into a family of educators in Strasbourg, France. She spent her childhood in southern France in Nice, Nîmes, and Cannes. She pursued her education in humanities (Hypokhâgne and Khâgne) in Lyon. Cuenat later became a French literature teacher in Paris. In 1953, she married André Gisselbrecht, a French Germanist, academic, and communist intellectual, with whom she had a daughter named Michèle.

=== Involvement in the Jeanson network and support for the FLN ===
In 1954, Cuenat joined the French Communist Party at the Sorbonne cell. Her commitment to Algerian independence intensified after witnessing France's use of torture during the Algerian War. Through her friend Étienne Bolo, she came into contact with Francis Jeanson.

She actively participated in the Jeanson network, providing logistical support to the FLN against the official stance of the French Communist Party. Following her arrest in 1960 at her shared residence with Francis Jeanson, she earned the nickname "the Tigress" for her resistance during the police raid. During her trial, she went on a hunger strike with other female members of the network to be recognized as political prisoners.

=== Escape from La Roquette Prison ===
On February 25, 1961, Cuenat successfully escaped from La Roquette prison in Paris along with five other members of the Jeanson network: Micheline Pouteau, Jacqueline Carré, Didar Fawzy-Rossano, Zina Haraigue, and Fatima Hamoud. They sawed through the prison bars and used a makeshift rope made from nylon stockings, rags, electrical wire, and clothesline.

=== Post-Algerian independence and later life ===
After Algeria gained independence, Cuenat lived there for ten years, among other anti-colonial activists known as the "Pieds-rouges". She initially resided in El Biar with Didar Fawzy-Rossano and journalist Ania Francos, later moving to Algiers. She worked at the Vocational Training Department and later managed a technician training center in Annaba for the national steel company. She obtained Algerian nationality during this period.

Cuenat returned to France in 1976 and pursued a career in adult vocational training at the Conservatoire national des arts et métiers until her retirement in 1986. She appeared in several films documenting French involvement in Algeria's independence struggle, including Les porteurs de valises (1989) by Michel Hermant and Les Frères des frères (1992) by Richard Copans.

In 2001, she published her autobiography La porte verte, which detailed her experiences, including her imprisonment.
