= Revolutionary activities in Algeria =

Revolutionary actions taking place in Algeria

After Algeria gained its independence from France in 1962, the country became an important hub for revolutionary activities in the Third World.

Already in the course of the Algerian War for independence between 1954 and 1962, the country had gained many international sympathizers. FLN leaders already played a leading role in international affairs (especially in the African context) before independence and established good relations with already independent countries. After gaining independence in July 1962, the government of the People's Democratic Republic of Algeria (RADP) continued to take international initiatives to implement the so-called Third World Project. Thus, the FLN not only played an important role in the creation of the Organization of African Unity (OAU) in April 1963, but also in maintaining global coalitions such as the Non-Aligned Movement (NAM). Algeria attracted foreign revolutionaries from all over the world and offered them not only hospitality but also military or material support. This included members of the Black Panther Party.

== Before independence ==
=== The Conference of Independent African States and the All-African Peoples' Conference ===
In 1958 the first president of independent Ghana, Kwame Nkrumah, convened two international conferences in Accra: The Conference of Independent African States (CIAS) and the All-African Peoples' Conference (AAPC). At the opening days of the CIAS in April 1958, representatives of the Algerian National Liberation Front (FLN) appeared without being invited before and asked to petition the participating heads of state. The discussion about the Algerian question thus became an unplanned main topic of the CIAS, which finally led to the participants of the CIAS expressing their unrestricted solidarity with the FLN. Although they refused material support, they promised to send a joint mission to various capitals to stand up for the Algerian question. At the AAPC in December 1958, Nkrumah promised in a speech his full support for all liberation movements and talked of his vision of a continental federation with sovereign African states. However, his nonviolent way to liberation was not in line with the opinion of active fighters for independence. The FLN member Ahmed Boumendjel took the word stating that France would only leave Algeria if they fight with force. Another important voice was the one of Frantz Fanon, who headed the Algerian delegation to the conference. He argued that violence is indeed needed in order to effectively fight against imperialism. Finally, the participants of the AAPC were convinced by the Algerian’s arguments and agreed that armed struggle was legitimate and that they would provide an international African Volunteer Brigade to support liberation movements.

=== Frantz Fanon ===
Frantz Fanon became an important figure for the Algerian liberation. As a psychiatric from Martinique, he came into contact with the National Liberation Army (ALN) as he provided them with psychiatric aid. Later he quit his job in an Algerian hospital, joined the movement and became writer at the FLN newspaper El Moudjahid. When he headed the Algerian delegation of the AAPC in 1958, he not only persuaded the participants of the need of an armed revolution in Algeria but also built good relationships with Patrice Lumumba (Congo), Holden Roberto (Angola) and Félix-Roland Moumié (Cameron), which had later an impact on Algeria’s role in their liberation movements. The two conferences in Accra in 1958 and Fanon’s convincing words showed that a Third World Project began to become more concrete. Finally, the publication of Fanon’s book The Wretched of the Earth in 1961 became a manual of revolution around the whole globe and marked a new stage in the awaking of the Third World. It was seen as the exemplary philosophy of violence required for the oppressed victims in an imperialist society.

=== Algeria's allies ===
These developments led to an integration of the FLN into the Third World movement at a time when the FLN involuntarily became even more transnational than it already was. This because military setbacks in Algeria led to the Morice Line, making Algeria's borders virtually impenetrable and forcing the leaders of the FLN and ALN to flee to Tunisia and Morocco. These two countries were concerned, however, that the FLN's stay could destabilise their own political conditions again. Thus, the FLN was highly motivated to win further allies. For the foreign minister of the Provisional Government of the Algerian Republic (GPRA), Crimea Belkacem, the first priority was to pursue new paths of friendship and support not only in Africa, but also globally. Since the Arab states were still unstable at the time, he wanted to get help from China, the Soviet Union (USSR), Ghana, Guinea, Venezuela and Cuba. The GPRA succeeded in seeking recognition around the world: in October 1960, the USSR recognized the GPRA De facto and the Asian Communist countries North Korea, South Vietnam and China De jure. In addition, other Warsaw Pact nations provided the FLN with training, arms and munition. The Ghanaian and Guinean government also allowed the Algerians to set up permanent offices in their countries and the GPRA was invited to the CIAS in June 1960 officially as the recognized government of Algeria. This support received from abroad was not forgot and had impacts on the Algerian open-door policy after independence.

=== Influence in internal politics of other countries ===
Beside the activities that built diplomatic components for the FLN within Africa, the Algerians also increased their contacts in more invisible areas: they provided their assistance to other underground movements that fought against the French suppression. Since the ALN was still stuck on the Morice Line and could not enter Algeria, any unrest in the French colonial empire was seen as useful for the Algerian struggle for independence and therefore the use of resources for other liberation movements was seen as effective. The first time when the FLN influenced internal politics of other countries was in Morocco and Tunisia. The FLN was convinced that the popular masses in Morocco and Tunisia would be much more supportive for their struggle than the king Hassan II of Morocco and Tunisia’s president Habib Bourguiba and therefore promoted propaganda among those populations. They also intervened with logistical and financial support for the left-wing opposition in Morocco’s elections in May 1960. The FLN continued with interfering in politics of other already independent countries, for example in the French Sudan. The Senegalese leader Léopold Sédar Senghor and Mali’s leader Modibo Keita had political inclinations, which hindered a Malian Federation. The FLN delivered weapons to a Marxist rebel group in order to ensure Keita’s ascendance. Similarly, the FLN supported the Sawaba party from Niger and the Union of the Peoples of Cameroon (UPC) to overthrow the government in power. The initiatives with the Sawaba party and the UPC were the beginning of a bigger engagement with rebellious forces over the whole continent. Through the permanent presence in the capitals of Ghana, Guinea and also Egypt which were major nexuses of the trans-African support network for revolutions, the Algerians connected with different groups not only from the Maghrib-Saharan region. This led to the fact that by the end of 1960, Algeria had provided guns, training or money to nationalist movements from Cameroon, Belgian Congo, Senegal, Ivory Coast, Mali, Morocco, Tunisia, Niger but also established relationships with Angola and South Africa. The ALN established guerrilla training camps in Morocco, Tunisia and Mali, were fighters of the whole Continent were taught and at the same time the idea of international solidarity was fostered. Therefore, the FLN was seen as a main contributor to a spirit of a combative pan-African internationalism. The combination of diplomatic components and all those relationships with other underground movements integrated the FLN in the transnational Third World trend and made the Algerian rebels to important promoters of ideas, methods, training and equipment among revolutionaries. This is significant considering the fact, that so far Algeria hasn't achieved its own independence but already played a central role in the Pan-Africanism.

== After independence ==
After becoming independent the ideals of Pan-Africanism remained a central component of Algeria’s international agenda.

=== Ben Bella’s influence ===
After achieving independence in July 1962, the People’s Democratic Republic of Algeria (RADP) continued to pursue the goal of becoming a leader in the Third World project. The first president Ahmed Ben Bella presented Algeria as a pilot state and a socialist experiment, which other African countries should follow and positioned Algeria in a moral sphere as a superpower. In front of the UN General Assembly in 1962, Ben Bella stated that Algeria will play the role of a responsible country regarding international security and peace issues and will support the black liberation movements in South Africa. In the same year, Ben Bella visited Cuba to show, that Algeria’s responsibility is not limited to the African Continent. The Algerian government showed their responsibility also with their immigration politics: it accepted influx of different idealists with visions to build a new world: thousands of foreigners arrived from France, Tunisia and Morocco during the first months of the new country, which often supported the FLN already during the Algerian War for independence. The so-called Pieds-rouges were visionaries that wanted to participate in the new Third World Project, an alternative to the Western and Eastern examples. In addition to that, Ben Bella committed to the principle of anticolonial solidarity and his country offered support and hospitality to underground movements over the whole globe. Therefore, Algiers became soon a hub for liberation organizations and exile for political opponents. Offices of all thinkable liberation organizations were in Algiers: the Viet Cong, African National Congress, Mozambique Liberation Front, The People’s Movement for the Liberation of Angola, Palestine Liberation Organization and other Palestinian fedayeen, and opponents of Francoist Spain. The nationalist rebel Amilcar Cabral from Guinea-Bissau therefore once named Algiers as the Mecca of Revolution. However, Ben Bella was also aware that the Third World Project could only be effective, if the nonaligned countries develop a real solidarity that goes over moral principles but become politically and economically concrete. Therefore, Ben Bella actively fostered the institutionalization of Third World’s principles and contributed for example strongly to the foundation of the Organization of African Unity (OAU) in 1963. In the founding conference of the OAU he stated that the new organization must concretely support liberation movements with arms, money and training in order to really achieve something. He said: “Let us all agree to die a little, so that the people still under colonial rule may be free and African unity may not become a vain word.“ Ben Bella's personal influence became particularly apparent after he was overthrown in 1965. During his short term in office, the president succeeded in becoming one of the most prominent leaders in the Third World. This is why the new regime under Houari Boumedienne was facing a crisis of legitimacy after the coup d'état. Both Egyptian President Gamal Abdel Nasser, who was very powerful in the Arab world, and African heads of state (Ghana and Tanzania) spoke out against the fall of Ben Bellas and demanded an investigation. Fidel Castro from Cuba called the Boumedienne and his followers enemies of socialism and the Algerian revolution.

=== Algeria's role within Africa ===
At independence Algeria was already well-positioned to have significant influence in African affairs. Not only did Algeria have the prestige and enthusiasm to influence developments in Africa, they also had the military troops and equipment to support other countries. Algeria gained soon after its independence even more respect especially of the colonies from the Portuguese Empire in Africa probably because it continued to support other liberation movements and seemed not to fear diplomatic reprisals from Western countries. By the end of 1962, Algeria offered already equipment, refuge and training to eight countries in Africa and promoted their assistance publicly. However, many countries were already independent by 1962 and therefore the Algerian government faced more a challenge between ideological purity and African unity. For example, their support for left-wing revolutionaries in Niger and Cameroon could threatened the creation of a continental intergovernmental institution. It was therefore Ben Bella, who launched a peacemaking campaign and spoke to different revolutionary groups in more Western oriented states such as the Ivory Coast. At the same time, Algeria also convinced other more radical countries in Africa, namely Guinea and Ghana for an African unity. However, this also required efforts to convince these countries that Algeria is not doing so in order to increase its own weight on the African continent. The mediating role of Algeria was finally a contribution to a successful founding of the OAU in April 1963. After the OAU conference, Algeria consolidated their diplomatic position by visiting different West African countries and welcome African leaders in Algiers. By the end of the year, Algeria succeeded in becoming a prominent actor over the whole continent and in enjoying good relationships with numerous countries. This was important since the Algerians made during the OAU a lot of compromises in order to reach African-unity but probably hoped to lead the governments of the OAU countries later in a more progressive direction.

=== Algeria’s role beyond Africa ===
The Algerian government was particularly active in Africa, but wanted to spread the Third World Project on a global level. The Algerian government saw the OAU as a pioneer for the global Third World Project and hoped for a global coalition of all revolutionary forces. Algeria was also to play a mediating role in this, primarily through the support of non-governmental movements. This gave Algeria acquaintances with movements around the world. In particular, the Algerian network expanded to Latin America: A group of Argentine guerrillas was included in the training, and shortly afterwards a delegation from the Venezuelan National Liberation Front was also included. In addition, Algeria became a bridge from the outside world to Africa and other sovereign states: For example, Ben Bella gave Fidel Castro's regime access to the outside world by trying to alleviate Cuba's export isolation. This could be seen as a provocation of the United States of America (USA). However, Algeria also benefited from medical teams sent to Algeria by the Castro regime, which in turn was the first actual implementation of Cuba's humanitarian internationalism. Yugoslavia was another important ally, a country that was not strongly integrated in Europe and therefore searched for access to Africa via Algeria. The Algerian government told Josip Broz Tito that the Non-Aligned Movement (NAM) was to be expanded and the Yugoslav government sought to strengthen its commitment to the decolonization of Africa. Cooperation was thus of mutual benefit: Yugoslavia benefited from Algeria's high credibility in Africa and contributed practical resources by equipping revolutionary movements with military material. However, Algeria's foreign policy has also created hostilities between major powers, especially the USA. After the Algerians had supported more opposition movements (Morocco, Nigeria, Ivory Coast, Cameroon) shortly after the founding of the OAU and had intensified their cooperation with Cuba and Yugoslavia, which were also involved in shaping African affairs, this was also seen as an international fight against the USA. In 1963, when Ben Bella expressed the wish to visit the White House, president John F. Kennedy refused. Thus, the beginning of Algeria's independent foreign policy was also seen as a new world in which smaller countries tried to resist the great powers.

== Black Panther Party in Algeria ==
The reception of the Black Panther Party (BPP) in Algiers may have been another provocation for the US, but was in line with the country's foreign policy at the time and probably mainly related to Algeria's position in the Third World.

=== Arrival ===
The Black Panther Party was at the time the most notorious militant Black organization in the U.S. and, according to the Federal Bureau of Investigation, the greatest threat to the internal security of the country. In June 1969 BPP Minister of Information Eldridge Cleaver, who was threatened with imprisonment in the US, arrived in Algiers. Originally his plan was to find asylum in Cuba, but he was only granted the status of a clandestine guest. Convinced by the Cuban authorities that he would be able to conduct political activity more freely in Algeria, he travelled to Algeria, where nobody expected his arrival. This was probably due to the fact that cooperation between Cuba and Algeria had practically come to a standstill since the fall of president Ahmed Ben Bella. Finally, the head of the FLN’s office in charge of liberation movements, Slimane Hoffman, agreed to welcome Cleaver under the condition that his presence in Algiers was announced first by the Algeria Press Service (APS). In the press conference he proclaimed: “Oppressed people need unity based on revolutionary principles rather than skin color.”

=== Time in Algeria ===
In October 1969 the International Section of the BPP requested with a petition official status as a liberation movement in Algeria, which was shortly after approved. In this year the International Section of the BPP initiated training sessions for movements from South Africa and Ethiopia and became unofficial bodyguards of members of the African National Congress. During this time, the Panthers were admired in the revolutionary scene, especially because their lifestyle remained American: they had material resources (villas, cars, horses) that other liberation movements could only dream of and significant media coverage. In 1970 Timothy Leary escaped from prison and fled to Algeria with his wife Rosemary. Their presence posed a danger to the Panthers, as the couple was known for their drug use and verbal excesses. In 1971 they were placed under house arrest by Cleaver Also in 1970, BPP leader Huey Newton got out of prison and applied for a visa for Algeria. This was rejected and the Panther section in Algeria under Cleaver increasingly separated from the one in the USA under Newton. Finally, the Algerian Panthers split from the BPP and renamed themselves the Revolutionary People’s Communication Network (RPCN). From that moment, money was a constant concern for the party. Abroad, it became increasingly difficult to win financial support for the Algiers group. In June 1972, a hijacked plane from the USA arrived in Algeria and delivered the Panthers $500,000. Another hijacked plane landed in Algiers a few months later, but this time the Algerian authorities controlled the incident and the money did not go to the Panthers. This could be seen as a proof that Algeria defined itself as a critic of the imperialist West and leader of the Third World, but not as a rogue state. The Algerian government made clear that they would not be accomplices in hijacking planes, even if they guaranteed the hijackers asylum.

=== Tensions with Algerian government ===
After the hijacking incidents, the Algiers-Panthers addressed an open letter to president Houari Boumediene accusing the Algerian government of turning its back on the struggle of the Afro-American people. This letter, which openly insulted the Algerian government, had strong consequences. Algeria was active in the international politics of non-aligned nations, supporting movements throughout the southern hemisphere, and thus had a lot at stake. The letter probably also showed that the Panthers did not understand the policies of their host country and did not understand the balance of power. After all, the Algiers-Panthers were almost homeless: They had split off from the organization in the US, international support was dwindling, and they were no longer welcome in Algeria. Nevertheless, the Algiers-Panthers continued to receive a monthly stipend from the FLN Office for Freedom Movement. However, they left the country in 1977.

== See also ==
- Pieds-rouges
