= Pieds-rouges =

The Pieds-rouges (Red feet) was a term for volunteers mainly of French nationality who travelled to Algeria after the Algerian War of Independence. They consisted of Trotskyists, Christian leftists and other communists who viewed Algeria as a base for revolutionary socialist activity.

The term is a combination of Pieds-noirs, a term used for colonial French settlers in Algeria, and rouge (red) for the left-wing sentiments of the volunteers. There is dispute over who coined the term. Kateb Yacine, the Algerian playwright and writer, is one of the contenders, along with the journalist Edmond Brua.

The emigration was encouraged by the National Liberation Front (FLN) to promote its Third World Project and gain practical knowledge from the thousands of educated immigrants.

Many of the Pieds-rouges left their home countries (Mainly France, but others did come from Spain, Malta and Italy) with little knowledge of the country they were arriving in.

The Pieds-rouges were just one of the many emigré groups based in Algeria. Many ant-imperialist groups, including the Black Panther Party, were supported by the Algerians as part of president Ahmed Ben Bella's program of supporting leftist groups across the world. The nationalist rebel Amilcar Cabral from Guinea-Bissau once called Algiers the Mecca of Revolution.

The influx of communist militants and other revolutionaries into the urban centres of Algeria created a revolutionary atmosphere described as "the historical continuation of the October Revolution."

Some famous Pieds-rouges included anti-colonialist journalist Henri Alleg, Jeanson network member Hélène Cuenat, Gérard Chaliand and Marceline Loridan-Ivens.

After the 1965 Algerian coup d'état and the deposition of Ben Bella by Houari Boumédiéne, the Third World Project ended and many of the Pieds rouges faced oppression and persecution in Algeria and returned to France.

== See Also ==
- Non-Aligned Movement
