= List of shipwrecks in March 1855 =

The list of shipwrecks in March 1855 includes ships sunk, foundered, wrecked, grounded, or otherwise lost during March 1855.

== 1 March ==
List of shipwrecks: 1 March 1855
Ship	State	Description
BAP Rímac	Peruvian Navy	The paddle steamer was wrecked near San Juan de Marcona with the loss of nearly 100 lives.

== 2 March ==
List of shipwrecks: 2 March 1855
Ship	State	Description
Alfred	Hamburg	The barque ran aground on the Goodwin Sands, Kent, United Kingdom. She was on a voyage from Batavia, Netherlands East Indies to Marstrand, Sweden. She was refloated.
Andre	Austrian Empire	The barque ran aground west of Seaford, Sussex. She was on a voyage from Constantinople, Ottoman Empire to Antwerp, Belgium. Her twelve crew survived. An attempt to refloat her by Paris United Kingdom was unsuccessful and she was wrecked in a gale that night.
Deerslayer	United Kingdom	The ship ran aground and sank on Taylor's Bank, in Liverpool Bay. She was on a voyage from Pernambuco, Brazil to Liverpool, Lancashire. She was refloated with the assistance of Iron Duke (United Kingdom and beached at Crosby, Lancashire). Deerslayer was refloated on 4 April and beached at Egremont, Lancashire for temporary repairs.
Drafna	Norway	The ship was driven ashore and damaged at Kinsale, County Cork, United Kingdom. She was on a voyage from Torrevieja, Spain to Dram, Norway.
John Bannerman	United Kingdom	The ship was driven ashore at Holyhead, Anglesey. She was on a voyage from New Orleans, Louisiana to Liverpool. She broke up on 3 March.

== 3 March ==
List of shipwrecks: 3 March 1855
Ship	State	Description
Kate	United Kingdom	The ship ran aground at Lerwick, Shetland Islands. She was on a voyage from Peterhead, Aberdeenshire to Lerwick. She was refloated.

== 4 March ==
List of shipwrecks: 4 March 1855
Ship	State	Description
Brothers	United Kingdom	The ship ran aground and sank in the Strangford Lough. She was on a voyage from Whitehaven, Cumberland to Dublin.
Catanid	United Kingdom	The ship was driven ashore at Warrenpoint, County Down. She was on a voyage from Troon, Ayrshire to Malta.

== 5 March ==
List of shipwrecks: 5 March 1855
Ship	State	Description
Commercie Campagnie	Belgium	The ship ran aground in the Scheldt at Bath, Zeeland, Netherlands. She was on a voyage from Havana, Cuba to Antwerp. She was refloated on 5 March.
Fanny Giffney	United Kingdom	The ship sprang a leak and foundered between Saint Croix and Saint Thomas, Virgin Islands. She was on a voyage from Liverpool, Lancashire to New Orleans, Louisiana, United States.
Tancred	United Kingdom	The ship was driven ashore near Alt Skagen, Denmark. She was on a voyage from South Shields, County Durham to Gothenburg, Sweden.

== 6 March ==
List of shipwrecks: 6 March 1855
Ship	State	Description
Barahona	Denmark	The barque was wrecked at Barahona, Dominican Republic.
Joys	United Kingdom	The schooner was driven onto the Cromer Rocks, off the coast of Lothian and broke her back. She was on a voyage from Bo'ness, Lothian to Dunkirk, Nord, France. She was refloated and towed in to Inverkeithing, Fife for repairs.

== 7 March ==
List of shipwrecks: 7 March 1855
Ship	State	Description
Commerce	United Kingdom	The brig ran aground on the Cockle Sand, in the North Sea off the coast of Norfolk. She broke her back and sank; her crew survived. She was on a voyage from Hartlepool, County Durham to Portsmouth, Hampshire.
Eleanor	United Kingdom	The ship struck the Kish Bank, in the Irish Sea and foundered. Her crew were rescued by the steamship Ocean (United Kingdom).
George Sutton	United Kingdom	The schooner was driven ashore and wrecked at Millisle, County Down.
Wellington	United Kingdom	The ship struck the Kish Bank and foundered. Her crew were rescued.

== 8 March ==
List of shipwrecks: 8 March 1855
Ship	State	Description
Reporter	United States	The fishing schooner sank in a gale on the Georges Bank. Lost with all 8 hands.
Samuel	Danzig	The brig collided with the brig Westmoreland (United Kingdom) and sank in Coal House Reach, in the River Thames. She was on a voyage from London to Jamaica.
Sovereign of the Seas	United States	The ship was driven ashore in the Woosung River. She was on a voyage from Hong Kong to Shanghai, China. She had been refloated by 24 March.

== 9 March ==
List of shipwrecks: 9 March 1855
Ship	State	Description
Atlas	United Kingdom	The ship foundered "off the Kensburg Light". Her crew were rescued. She was on a voyage from Newport, Monmouthshire to Cork.
Golden Mirror	United States	The ship was abandoned in the Atlantic Ocean. Her crew were rescued. She was on a voyage from New York to Toulon, Var, France.
Mary Ann	United Kingdom	The ship ran aground on the Ocklocknee Shoal. She was on a voyage from Liverpool, Lancashire to Apalachicola, Florida, United States. She was refloated.
Susan	United Kingdom	The ship was wrecked on the English Bank, in the River Plate. She was on a voyage from the Clyde to Montevideo, Uruguay.

== 10 March ==
List of shipwrecks: 10 March 1855
Ship	State	Description
Alice Ferret	United Kingdom	The ship was driven ashore at Greenman's Point, County Down. She was on a voyage from Warrenpoint, County Down to Liverpool, Lancashire.
Experiment	United Kingdom	The ship was driven ashore on "Hertshoem", Denmark. She was on a voyage from Hull, Yorkshire to Helsingør, Denmark. She was refloated the next day.
Henrietta!	United Kingdom	The barque ran aground on the Mixon Sands, in the Bristol Channel and was abandoned by her crew. She was refloated the next day. Henrietta! was on a voyage from Cuba to Swansea, Glamorgan, Wales.
Maria	United Kingdom	The schooner was wrecked at Great Egg Harbor, New Jersey, United States. She was on a voyage from Palermo, Sicily to New York, United States.
Omnibus	United Kingdom	The ship ran aground "near the Perch" and was abandoned. She was on a voyage from Pentewen, Cornwall to Fowey, Caernarfon and Runcorn, Cheshire.

== 11 March ==
List of shipwrecks: 11 March 1855
Ship	State	Description
Agenoria	United Kingdom	The ship was driven ashore and wrecked at Scarborough, Yorkshire. She was on a voyage from London to North Shields, County Durham.
Aurora	United Kingdom	The ship was driven ashore at Dunbar, Lothian. Her crew were rescued. She was on a voyage from Sunderland, County Durham to Aberdeen. She was refloated on 4 April and found to be severely damaged.
Elizabeth	United Kingdom	The brig ran aground at Waterford. She was refloated the next day.
Exmouth	United Kingdom	The ship ran aground and sank at Boulogne, Pas-de-Calais, France. She was on a voyage from Cardiff, Glamorgan to Boulogne. She was subsequently refloated and repaired.
Experiment	United Kingdom	The ship was driven ashore on "Hertsholm", Denmark. She was on a voyage from Hull, Yorkshire to Helsingør, Denmark. She was refloated the next day.
Harriet	United Kingdom	The ship ran aground on the Quarries, in the Orkney Islands. She was on a voyage from South Shields, County Durham to Dublin.
Henrietta	United Kingdom	The ship ran aground on the Mixon Shoal and was abandoned by her crew. She was on a voyage from Cuba to Swansea, Glamorgan. She was refloated and taken in to the Mumbles.
Letitia	United Kingdom	The ship was abandoned in the Atlantic Ocean off the American coast. Her crew were rescued by Charles Croker (United States). Letitia was on a voyage from British Honduras to London.

== 12 March ==
List of shipwrecks: 12 March 1855
Ship	State	Description
Eleanor	United Kingdom	The barque was driven ashore and wrecked near Breaksea Point, Glamorgan. She was refloated on 24 March and towed in to Bristol, Gloucestershire.
Fiducie	France	The ship was driven ashore at Saint-Pierre-en-Port, Seine-Inférieure. Her crew were rescued. She was on a voyage from Martinique to Havre de Grâce, Seine-Inférieure. She was declared a total loss.
Hendrik Hudson	United States	The ship foundered in the Atlantic Ocean (38°40′N 70°00′W) with the loss of two of her crew. Her surviving crew and passengers were rescued by the barque Elk (United States). Hendrick Hudson was on a voyage from New York to London, United Kingdom.
Pomona	United Kingdom	The brigantine was abandoned in the Atlantic Ocean. Her crew were rescued by Ingleborough (United Kingdom). Pomona was on a voyage from Matanzas, Cuba to Halifax, Nova Scotia, British North America.
Sandusky	United Kingdom	The ship ran aground on the Moselle Shoals. She was on a voyage from Liverpool, Lancashire to New Orleans, Louisiana, United States. She was refloated on 15 March and resumed her voyage.

== 13 March ==
List of shipwrecks: 13 March 1855
Ship	State	Description
Agamemnon	United Kingdom	The barque was wrecked on "Madittimo Island", Kingdom of the Two Sicilies. Her crew were rescued. She was on a voyage from Alexandria, Egypt to Malta.
Delta	United Kingdom	The ship was driven ashore 30 nautical miles (56 km) south of Bridlington, Yorkshire. She was on a voyage from Newcastle upon Tyne, Northumberland to London.
Diligence	Danzig	The barque was driven ashore at Brekkestø, Norway. She was on a voyage from Liverpool, Lancashire, United Kingdom to Königsberg, Prussia.
Henriette Elizabeth	United Kingdom	The ship ran aground at Hartlepool, County Durham. She was on a voyage from Blyth, Northumberland to Boulogne, Pas-de-Calais, France. She had been refloated by 26 March and taken in to Hartlepool.
Mars	United Kingdom	The smack was driven ashore and sank at Porthdinllaen, Caernarfonshire.
New Milford	United Kingdom	The smack was driven ashore and sank at Porthdinllaen.

== 14 March ==
List of shipwrecks: 14 March 1855
Ship	State	Description
Aurora	Hamburg	The ship was run ashore in Moreton Bay. All on board were rescued. She was on a voyage from Hamburg to Sydney, New South Wales.
Ord	United Kingdom	The collier, a brig, was sunk by ice in the Baltic Sea off "Wingo". Her crew were rescued.
Rosherville	United Kingdom	The brig was destroyed by fire at St. Mary's, Isles of Scilly. She was on a voyage from London to Jamaica.
William Russell	United Kingdom	The ship was wrecked south of Lagos, Portugal with the loss of two of her thirteen crew. She was on a voyage from Liverpool, Lancashire to Livorno, Grand Duchy of Tuscany.

== 15 March ==
List of shipwrecks: 15 March 1855
Ship	State	Description
Albert	United Kingdom	The schooner was driven ashore 3 nautical miles (5.6 km) east of Dunbar, Lothian. Her crew were rescued. She was on a voyage from Hartlepool, County Durham to Dundee, Forfarshire.
Banshee	United Kingdom	The barque was wrecked off Cape Kaliakra, Ottoman Empire. Her crew were rescued by HMS Inflexible (Royal Navy).
Economy	United Kingdom	The schooner was wrecked between Kamiesch, Russian Empire and Varna, Ottoman Empire. Her crew were rescued by HMS Inflexible (Royal Navy).
Edinburgh	United Kingdom	The paddle steamer struck a sunken rock, broke in two and sank off Cape Kakiakra. All on board reached land, from where they were rescued by HMS Inflexible (Royal Navy).
Feliz	Norway	The brig ran aground on the Herd Sand, in the North Sea off the coast of County Durham. She was refloated and taken in to Hartlepool in a severely leaky condition.
Hugh Bourne	United Kingdom	The schooner was driven ashore at Tynemouth, Northumberland. Her crew got aboard the brig Heather (United Kingdom) the next morning when that vessel also drove ashore. They were subsequently rescued by the Tynemouth Lifeboat.
James	United Kingdom	The ship sprang a leak off Dublin whilst on a voyage from Glasgow, Renfrewshire to Porto, Portugal. She put into the Belfast Lough, where she ran aground on the Briggs Rocks. She was refloated and taken in to Belfast, County Antrim.
Louisa	(United Kingdom of Great Britain and Ireland) Jersey	The smack was driven ashore and wrecked at Newton-by-the-Sea, Northumberland. Her crew were rescued. She was on a voyage from Newport, Monmouthshire to Leith, Lothian.
Mistral	France	The barque was wrecked off Cape Kaliakra. Her crew were rescued by Edinburgh (United Kingdom).
Southern Cross	United Kingdom	The clipper, a barque struck the Maen y Sais Rock, off Rhoscolyn, Anglesey and was wrecked with the loss of one of her eighteen crew. Survivors were rescued by the Rhoscolyn lifeboat. She was on a voyage from Tynemouth, Northumberland to Liverpool, Lancashire.
Thomas and Mary	United Kingdom	The ship was driven ashore and wrecked at Tynemouth Castle, Northumberland with the loss of all hands.
Young Hunter	United Kingdom	The ship ran aground on the Isle of Whithorn, Lancashire and was damaged. She was on a voyage from Liverpool to Belfast.

== 16 March ==
List of shipwrecks: 16 March 1855
Ship	State	Description
Alert	United Kingdom	The ship was driven ashore near Dubar, Lothian. She was on a voyage from Hartlepool, County Durham to Dundee, Forfarshire. She was refloated on 4 April and found to be severely damaged.
Elizabeth	United Kingdom	The schooner was driven ashore in Robin Hoods Bay, Yorkshire.
Gromonosets	Imperial Russian Navy	Crimean War: The paddle frigate sank at Sevastopol as a result of damage inflicted by British artillery.
Harriet and Phœbe	United Kingdom	The Mersey flat was discovered derelict in Liverpool Bay. She was towed in to Liverpool, Lancashire by the tug Athens (United Kingdom).
Heather	United Kingdom	The brig was driven ashore and wrecked at Tynemouth, Northumberland. Her crew were rescued by the Tynemouth Lifeboat.
Hugh Bourne	United Kingdom	The ship was driven ashore and wrecked at Tynemouth.
Louisa	United Kingdom	The fishing lugger was driven ashore and wrecked at Withernsea, Yorkshire with the loss of all but one of her crew.
Samarang	United Kingdom	The ship struck a sunken rock off Dartmouth, Devon and was damaged. She was on a voyage from Southampton, Hampshire to Melbourne, Victoria.
Victor Emanuel	Kingdom of Sardinia	The steamship ran aground in the English Channel. She was refloated and put in to Plymouth, Devon, United Kingdom.

== 17 March ==
List of shipwrecks: 17 March 1855
Ship	State	Description
Jean	(United Kingdom of Great Britain and Ireland) New South Wales	The brig ran aground and capsized at Newcastle.
John Stewart	United Kingdom	The brig was wrecked on the Barrows Sand, off the north Kent coast. Her crew were rescued by Liberty (United Kingdom). John Stewart was on a voyage from Seaham, County Durham to London.
London	United Kingdom	The ship was driven ashore at Newton-by-the-Sea, Northumberland. She was on a voyage from Newport, Monmouthshire to Leith, Lothian.

== 18 March ==
List of shipwrecks: 18 March 1855
Ship	State	Description
Anna	United Kingdom	The ship sank off the Point of Ayr, Cheshire. Her crew were rescued. She was on a voyage from Belfast, County Antrim to Liverpool, Lancashire.
Duc de Brabant	Belgium	The ship was wrecked near Key West, Florida, United States. Her crew were rescued. She was on a voyage from Antwerp to Havana, Cuba.
Margaretha Ida	Netherlands	The ship was wrecked at Akyab, Burma. she was on a voyage from Rotterdam, South Holland to Akyab.
News	United Kingdom	The ship ran aground 2 nautical miles (3.7 km) north of Lowestoft, Suffolk. She was on a voyage from South Shields, County Durham to Lowestoft.

== 19 March ==
List of shipwrecks: 19 March 1855
Ship	State	Description
Australia	(United Kingdom of Great Britain and Ireland) New South Wales	The barque was driven ashore in Portland Bay.
Bedlington	United Kingdom	Crimean War: The ship was sunk in the Danube at Izmail, Ottoman Empire by Russian artillery. Her 21 crew survived, but were taken prisoner by the Russians. She was on a voyage from Galaţi, Ottoman Empire to London.
Brothers	United Kingdom	The brig was wrecked in Strangford Lough.
Constant	(United Kingdom of Great Britain and Ireland) New South Wales	The barque was driven ashore in Portland Bay. Her crew were rescued.
Creole	United Kingdom	The barque ran aground off Cape Henelopen, Delaware, United States. She was on a voyage from Londonderry to Philadelphia, Pennsylvania, United States.
Hoffnung	Prussia	The sloop was discovered off Widewall, Orkney Islands, United Kingdom in a waterlogged condition and was beached. She had been on a voyage from Hartlepool, County Durham, United Kingdom to Königsberg, the last entry in her logbook having been made on 26 September 1854.
St. Patrick	United States	The ship was driven ashore at the Pass A L'Outre Lighthouse, Louisiana. She was on a voyage from New York to New Orleans, Louisiana. She was later refloated and completed her voyage.

== 20 March ==
List of shipwrecks: 20 March 1855
Ship	State	Description
Medway	United Kingdom	The brig was wrecked on the Whittaker Spit, in the Thames Estuary.
Menodora	United Kingdom	The ship was driven ashore at Beachy Head, Sussex. She was on a voyage from South Shields, County Durham to .Shoreham-by-Sea, Sussex. She was refloated and taken in to Shoreham-by-Sea in a leaky condition.
Saguenay	United Kingdom	The brig was driven ashore near South Foreland, Kent. She was on a voyage from Hull, Yorkshire to Malta. She was refloated.
Salus	United Kingdom	The full-rigged ship was driven ashore at Blackrock County Dublin. Her six crew survived. She was on a voyage from Maryport, Cumberland to Dublin. Salus was refloated on 30 March. She was towed to Soldier's Point by the tug James Watt (United Kingdom).
Sarah Jane	United Kingdom	The brig was driven ashore and wrecked at Hartlepool, County Durham. Her crew were rescued. She was on a voyage from London to Hartlepool.
Thomas	United Kingdom	The schooner was driven ashore and wrecked at St. Ives, Cornwall. Her crew were rescued. She was on a voyage from Cardiff, Glamorgan to Hayle, Cornwall.
Thomas & Anne	United Kingdom	The brig was wrecked on the Goodwin Sands, Kent with the loss of one of her six crew. Survivors were rescued by the lugger Fame (United Kingdom).

== 21 March ==
List of shipwrecks: 21 March 1855
Ship	State	Description
Agenoria	United Kingdom	The ship ran aground on the Goodwin Sands, Kent. She was on a voyage from Hull, Yorkshire to Brixham, Devon. She was refloated with assistance from a steamship and the Ramsgate Lifeboat and taken in to Ramsgate, Kent in a leaky condition.
Barbara	United Kingdom	The ship was driven ashore at Fleetwood, Lancashire.
Countess of Morley	United Kingdom	The schooner was driven ashore at Gibraltar. She had been refloated by 31 March.
Dublin	United Kingdom	The steamship ran aground and was damaged at Penzance, Cornwall. She was on a voyage from Liverpool, Lancashire to Waterford and London.
Economist	United Kingdom	The barque was driven ashore at Gibraltar. She was on a voyage from Cardiff, Glamorgan to Constantinople, Ottoman Empire. She had been refloated by 31 March. She was refloated on 31 March.
Edward Bilton	United Kingdom	The ship was run into by a Spanish brig and severely damaged at Gibraltar.
Emma Goodwin	United Kingdom	The barque was driven into HMS Vengeance (Royal Navy) and severely damaged in a gale at Gibraltar.
Hopewell	United Kingdom	The barque was driven ashore and wrecked at Gibraltar. Her crew survived. She was on a voyage from Malta to Newcastle upon Tyne, Northumberland.
Industry	United Kingdom	The brig was wrecked on the Inner Dowsing Sand, in The Wash. Her crew were rescued by Mariner (United Kingdom). She was on a voyage from South Shields, County Durham to London.
Neue Unterneming	Prussia	The brig was wrecked at "Adia", Spain.
Pauline	France	The brig was driven ashore at Gibraltar.
Progressista	Portugal	The barque was driven ashore at Gibraltar. She had been refloated by 31 March.
R. Patterson	United States	The barque was driven ashore at Gibraltar.
Sovereign	United Kingdom	The ship was driven into a hulk and severely damaged at Gibraltar. She was on a voyage from Cardiff to Constantinople.
St. Crispin	United Kingdom	The brig was driven ashore near Almería, Spain. She was on a voyage from Liverpool to Constantinople. She was refloated on 30 April and taken in to Cartagena, Spain.
Thames, and Walker	United Kingdom	Thames broke from her mooring at North Shields, County Durham and was driven in to Walker. Both vessels were beached in a sinking condition.
Twins	United Kingdom	The schooner was driven ashore at Kingsdown, Kent. She was refloated and resumed her voyage .
Waterloo	United Kingdom	The ship was in collision with a whale and foundered in the North Sea 50 nautical miles (93 km) east by south of Lowestoft, Suffolk. Her six crew were rescued by the fishing boat No. 22 (France). Waterloo was on a voyage from King's Lynn, Norfolk to Schiedam, South Holland, Netherlands.
William	United Kingdom	The schooner struck a sunken rock and sank in Jack Sound. She was on a voyage from Whitehaven, Cumberland to Newport, Monmouthshire.
Zephyr	United Kingdom	The brig was driven ashore and wrecked at Gibraltar. She was on a voyage from Gibraltar to Barbados.
Zingari	United Kingdom	The steamship ran aground and was damaged at Hartlepool. She was refloated.

== 22 March ==
List of shipwrecks: 22 March 1855
Ship	State	Description
Alice	United Kingdom	The barque was driven ashore and wrecked at Dungeness, Kent. She was on a voyage from South Shields, County Durham to Havana, Cuba. Alice was refloated and towed in to Cowes, Isle of Wight for repairs.
Amadora	Spain	The ship was wrecked on the Memory Rock, in the Bahamas. She was on a voyage from Havana to Alicante.
Commercial	United Kingdom	The brig foundered in the North Sea 6 nautical miles (11 km) off Flamborough Head, Yorkshire with the loss of six of her seven crew. The survivor was rescued by the barque Isabella (United Kingdom).
Diana	United Kingdom	The brig ran aground on the Newgate Rock, off Margate, Kent. She was on a voyage from Newcastle upon Tyne, Northumberland to Sidmouth, Devon.
Hebe	Flag unknown	The ship was driven ashore at Dover Castle, Kent. She was on a voyage from Messina, Sicily to Copenhagen, Denmark. She was refloated and taken in to Dover.
Jaggeren	Duchy of Holstein	The sloop was driven ashore and wrecked at "Lila", Denmark. She was on a voyage from Newcastle upon Tyne to Flensburg.
Major Nanny	United Kingdom	The ship was wrecked at Newquay, Cornwall.
News	United Kingdom	The ship was driven ashore. She was on a voyage from South Shields to Lowestoft, Suffolk. She was refloated on 6 April and taken in to Lowestoft in a leaky condition.
Niagara	United Kingdom	The barque ran aground at Berbice, British Guiana. She was on a voyage from the Clyde to Demerara, British Guiana.
Red Rover	United Kingdom	The ship ran aground on the Cliff Foot Rock, off the coast of Essex. She was on a voyage from Newcastle upon Tyne, Northumberland to Honfleur, Calvados, France.
Snowdon	United Kingdom	The ship was driven ashore at Baldoyle, County Dublin. She was on a voyage from Liverpool, Lancashire to Newfoundland, British North America. She was refloated on 3 April and put back to Liverpool.
St. Crispin	United Kingdom	The ship was driven ashore east of "Eutinas". She was on a voyage from Liverpool to Constantinople, Ottoman Empire.
Thomas and Ada	United Kingdom	The brig was wrecked on the Goodwin Sands with the loss of one of her six crew. Survivors were rescued by the lugger Fame (United Kingdom). Thomas and Ada was on a voyage from Middlesbrough, Yorkshire to Fécamp, Seine-Inférieure, France.

== 23 March ==
List of shipwrecks: 23 March 1855
Ship	State	Description
Albion	United Kingdom	The ship was driven ashore north of Bridlington, Yorkshire. Her crew were rescued. She was on a voyage from Newcastle upon Tyne, Northumberland to Havre de Grâce, Seine-Inférieure, France. She was refloated on 29 March and taken in to Bridlington.
Argonaut	United Kingdom	The ship was damaged by fire at Birkenhead, Cheshire.
Sisters	United Kingdom	The ship ran aground and was damaged at Hartlepool, county Durham.

== 24 March ==
List of shipwrecks: 24 March 1855
Ship	State	Description
Bromleys	United Kingdom	The barque was severely damaged by fire at Berbice, British Guiana.
Hamlet	United Kingdom	The barque struck a rock off "Lingza" and foundered. Her crew were rescued. She was on a voyage from Singapore, Straits Settlements to the Swan River Colony.
Lodewyk Anthonie	Netherlands	The ship was wrecked at Akyab, Burma. She was on a voyage from Sydney, New South Wales to Akyab.
Undine	United Kingdom	The schooner was driven ashore at Whitby, Yorkshire. She was on a voyage from Newcastle upon Tyne, Northumberland to Havre de Grâce, Seine-Inférieure, France.

== 25 March ==
List of shipwrecks: 25 March 1855
Ship	State	Description
Natal	United Kingdom	The steamship was wrecked at Conil de la Frontera, Spain with the loss of a crew member. She was on a voyage from Southampton, Hampshire to Marseille, Bouches-du-Rhône, France.
Waterloo	United Kingdom	The ship was driven ashore on Saint Domingo. She was on a voyage from Saint Domingo to Liverpool, Lancashire.

== 26 March ==
List of shipwrecks: 26 March 1855
Ship	State	Description
Amy	United Kingdom	The ship ran aground on the Drumore Bank, in the Irish Sea. She was on a voyage from Africa to Liverpool, Lancashire. She was refloated the next day and put in to Waterford.
Arend	Netherlands	The schooner ran aground near the Torretiles and was damaged. She was refloated and put in to Akyab, Burma, where she was repaired.

== 27 March ==
List of shipwrecks: 27 March 1855
Ship	State	Description
Triton	Sweden	The brig was wrecked at Itapoá, Brazil. Her crew were rescued. She was on a voyage from Cardiff, Glamorgan, United Kingdom.

== 28 March ==
List of shipwrecks: 28 March 1855
Ship	State	Description
Climax	United States	The clipper sank at Callao, Peru. Subsequently sold, refloated, repaired and entered Peruvian service as Antonio Terry.

== 29 March ==
List of shipwrecks: 29 March 1855
Ship	State	Description
Jorge Cornellia	Netherlands	The schuyt was discovered derelict in the North Sea. She was taken in to Lowestoft, Suffolk, United Kingdom in a waterlogged condition.
Kitty	United Kingdom	The schooner ran aground and was damaged at Orfordness, Suffolk. She was refloated and put in to Aldeburgh, Suffolk.

== 30 March ==
List of shipwrecks: 30 March 1855
Ship	State	Description
George	United Kingdom	The ship was driven ashore at Redcar, Yorkshire. She was on a voyage from South Shields, County Durham to Constantinople, Ottoman Empire. She was refloated and put in to the River Tees.
John and Mary	United Kingdom	The ship ran aground on the Newcombe Sand, in the North Sea off the coast of Suffolk. She was on a voyage from Gainsborough, Lincolnshire to London.
Martha	United Kingdom	The ship ran aground on the Holm Sand, in the North Sea off the coast of Suffolk. She was on a voyage from Hull, Yorkshire to Liverpool, Lancashire.
Sarah	United Kingdom	The brig was destroyed by fire in Carlisle Bay, Barbados.
St. Hellen	United Kingdom	The ship ran aground on the Holm Sand. She was on a voyage from Hartlepool, County Durham to Waterford. She was refloated and resumed her voyage.

== 31 March ==
List of shipwrecks: 31 March 1855
Ship	State	Description
Mary Ann	United Kingdom	The ship ran aground on the Hittorp Reef, in the Baltic Sea.

== Unknown date ==
List of shipwrecks: Unknown date in March 1855
Ship	State	Description
Abner L. Colby	United States	The fishing schooner was lost on the Georges Bank. Lost with all 8 crew.
Bille Brahe	Netherlands	The ship was abandoned in the Atlantic Ocean. Her crew were rescued by James White (United Kingdom). Bille Brahe was on a voyage from Rotterdam, South Holland to Boston, Massachusetts, United States.
Brenda	United Kingdom	The ship sprang a leak and sank off the Rugged Islands before 17 March. She was on a voyage from Shanghai, China to Hong Kong.
Burmah	United Kingdom	The barque was driven ashore north of Granville, Manche, France before 22 March. She was on a voyage from the Crimea to Southampton, Hampshire. She was refloated with the assistance of HMS Dasher (Royal Navy) and taken in to Saint Helier, Jersey, Channel Islands.
City of Montreal	United Kingdom	The ship foundered in Carnarvon Bay before 22 March.
Constantine	French Navy	The corvette ran aground in the Yangtze kiang before 15 March. She was refloated with assistance from the steamship Formosee (Flag unknown).
Eva	United States	The ship was wrecked on the Riding Rocks before 9 March. She was on a voyage from New Orleans, Louisiana to Trieste.
Falcon	United Kingdom	The ship was abandoned in the Atlantic Ocean before 12 March. Her crew were rescued by Harkaway (United Kingdom). Falcon was on a voyage from Savannah, Georgia, United States to Liverpool, Lancashire.
Grace de Dieu	France	The schooner was wrecked near Tarifa, Spain in early March. Her crew survived. She was on a voyage from Marseille, Bouches-du-Rhône to Seville, Spain.
Hamilton	United Kingdom	The brig was abandoned in the Atlantic Ocean before 5 February. Her crew were rescued. She was on a voyage from Saint John, New Brunswick, British North America to Matanzas, Cuba.
Hebe	United Kingdom	The cutter was in collision with another vessel and was abandoned in the North Sea off the coast of Norfolk. She was towed in to Grimsby, Lincolnshire on 14 March.
Helen	United Kingdom	The ship was abandoned in the Atlantic Ocean before 5 March. She was on a voyage from Savannah, Georgia to Liverpool.
Isle of Thanet	United Kingdom	The ship was wrecked south of "Borongo Island". Her crew were rescued. She was on a voyage from Galle, Ceylon to Akyab, Burma.
James Campbell	United Kingdom	The ship foundered in the Atlantic Ocean. She was on a voyage from Aux Cayes, Haiti to Falmouth, Cornwall.
John Thompson	United Kingdom	The brig was abandoned in the Atlantic Ocean. Her crew were rescued by Amy (United Kingdom). John Thompson was on a voyage from Guayaquil, Ecuador to Queenstown, County Cork.
Lisbon	United Kingdom	The ship was driven ashore at Ericeira, Portugal. She was on a voyage from Lisbon, Portugal to Liverpool.
Mary Russell	United States	The ship was lost in the Caribbean Sea. Her crew survived.
Masonic	(United Kingdom of Great Britain and Ireland) British North America	The brig was wrecked at Bonavista, Newfoundland.
Pelican	United Kingdom	The brig was wrecked at Ramsey, Isle of Man.
Polly	United Kingdom	The barque was wrecked at Ramsey.
Reporter	United States	The fishing schooner was lost on the Georges Bank. Lost with all 8 crew.
State Rights	United States	The ship was abandoned in the Atlantic Ocean before 16 March. Her crew were rescued. She was on a voyage from Philadelphia, Pennsylvania to Liverpool.
Stockton	United Kingdom	The brig foundered in the North Sea off the coast of Yorkshire in late March.
