= Dubar =

Dubar is a surname. Notable people with the surname include:

- Claude Dubar (1945–2015), French sociologist
- Jambres Dubar (born 2004), American football player
- Pat Dubar, American singer
