= Kathleen Cleaver =

American law professor and activist (born 1945)

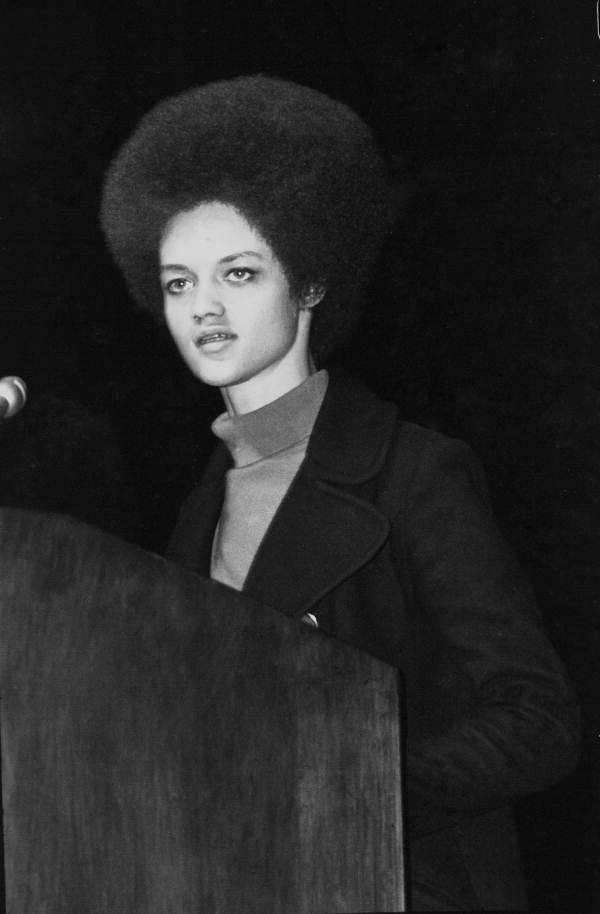
- Cleaver delivering a speech in Ruby Diamond Auditorium at Florida State University, November 1971
- Born: Kathleen Neal; May 13, 1945 (age 81); Dallas, Texas, U.S.
- Occupations: Activist, lawyer, academic
- Political party: Black Panther Party
- Movement: Black Power movement
- Spouse: Eldridge Cleaver (m. 1967; div. 1987)
- Children: 2

Kathleen Neal Cleaver (born May 13, 1945) is an American law professor and activist known for her involvement with the Black Power movement and the Black Panther Party (BPP). She was the BPP's Communications Secretary and the wife of its Minister of Information, Eldridge Cleaver.

== Early life ==
Juette Kathleen Neal was born in Dallas, Texas, on May 13, 1945. Her parents were both activists and graduates of the University of Michigan. Her father, Ernest Eugene Neal, was a sociology professor at Wiley College in Marshall, Texas, and her mother, Pearl Juette Johnson, earned a master's degree in mathematics. Three years after Cleaver was born, her father accepted a job as the director of the Rural Life Council of Tuskegee Institute in Alabama, and they moved to a predominantly segregated, middle class community. Years later, Ernest joined the Foreign Service. The family moved abroad and lived in such countries as India, Liberia, Sierra Leone, and the Philippines. Spending time in India exposed Kathleen to different beliefs, including socialism, communism, and nationalism.

The family returned to the United States after her brother died from leukemia and the family broke apart. Cleaver attended George School, a Quaker boarding school near Philadelphia, graduating with honors in 1963. She continued her education at Oberlin College in Ohio and later transferred to Barnard College in New York. In 1966, she left college for a secretarial job with the New York office of the Student Nonviolent Coordinating Committee (SNCC) after her friend from childhood, Sammy Younge, had been murdered by white supremacists. The shift of the movement was characterized by the change from "Freedom Now" to "Black Power."

== Black Panther Party ==
Kathleen was in charge of organizing a student conference at Fisk University in Nashville, Tennessee. There she met Eldridge Cleaver, the minister of information for the Black Panther Party, who was speaking at the conference. He had just gotten out of jail, where he had written Soul on Ice. She moved to San Francisco in November 1967 to join the Black Panther Party, and after Christmas, Eldridge and Kathleen married. She joined about three to four weeks after Huey Newton was charged for killing an Oakland policeman in a pre-dawn shootout. It was in San Francisco that Kathleen became the Communications Secretary for the party and worked on organizing demonstrations, creating pamphlets, holding press conferences, designing posters, and speaking at rallies and on TV. Cleaver applied everything that she learned from the SNCC to the Black Panther Party. She created the position herself, motivated by Julian Bond in SNCC. As Communications Secretary, she was the first female member of the Party's decision-making body. The position combined the role of spokesperson and press secretary. Cleaver organized the national campaign to free Huey Newton. Despite the fact that over two thirds of Black Panthers were women, only a few held positions in the party's leadership. Besides Cleaver, these included Elaine Brown and Ericka Huggins.

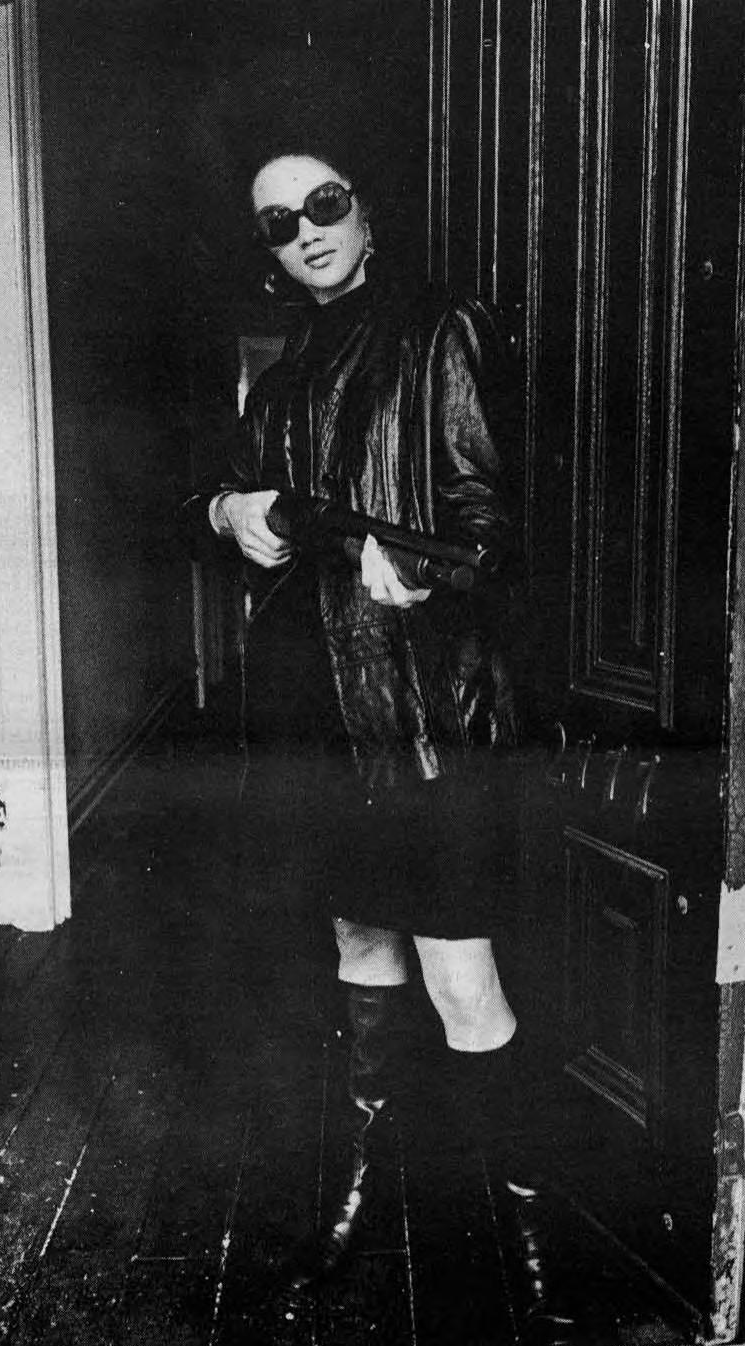
Photo of Cleaver published in The Black Panther, 1968

The first major attack against the Black Panther Party was in the 1960s by Los Angeles's first SWAT team. By 1971, almost 30 party members had been killed. Cleaver had a difficult time healing from the murder of so many of her colleagues and was emotionally scarred. In 1968 (the same year her husband ran for president on the Peace and Freedm ticket), she ran for California's 18th state assembly district, also as a candidate of the Peace and Freedom Party. Cleaver received 2,778 votes for 4.7% of the total vote, finishing third in a four-candidate race.

As a result of their involvement with the Black Panther Party, the Cleavers were often the target of police investigations. The Cleavers' apartment was raided in 1968 before a Panther rally by the San Francisco Tactical Squad on suspicion of hiding guns and ammunition. Later that year, Eldridge Cleaver was said to have staged an ambush of Oakland police officers during which two police officers were injured. Cleaver was wounded and fellow Black Panther member Bobby Hutton was killed in a shootout following the initial exchange of gunfire. Charged with attempted murder, he jumped bail to flee to Cuba and later went to Algeria.

During Cleaver's time with the Black Panther Party, she helped feed people, provided medical care to families, and took families to visit loved ones in prison. She also “helped put together healing retreats for women who had been in the Black Panther Party, women who had been living underground, who had been tortured, who had been exiled.”

== Living in exile ==
In 1969, Kathleen reunited with Eldridge in Algeria. Cleaver gave birth to their first son, Maceo, soon after arriving in Algeria. A year later in 1970, she gave birth to their daughter Joju Younghi Cleaver, while the family was in North Korea. Eldridge had increasingly found himself at odds with Huey Newton, one of the party's co-founders and leaders, over the direction the group should take; Newton, recently out of jail, was channeling resources into re-establishing the community outreach "survival programmes", whereas Cleaver favoured a more direct, and at times violent, approach. In 1971, this discord led to the separation of the International Branch of the Black Panther Party, as the Cleavers formed a new organisation called the Revolutionary People's Communication Network. Cleaver returned to promoting and speaking about the organization. To accomplish this, she and the children moved back to New York.

The Algerian government became disgruntled with Eldridge and the new organization, and he was forced to leave the country secretly and meet with Kathleen in Paris in 1973. Kathleen left for the United States later that year to arrange Eldridge's return and raise a defence fund. In 1974, the French government granted legal residency to the Cleavers, and the family was reunited. However, after only a year, the Cleavers moved back to the United States, where Eldridge was arrested and tried for the shoot-out in 1968. He was found guilty of assault and sentenced to five years' probation and 2,000 hours of community service. Cleaver went to work on the Eldridge Cleaver Defense Fund, and he was freed on bail in 1976. Eldridge's legal situation was not resolved until 1980. Throughout this time, Eldridge shifted his political views to the right.

== Later life ==
Kathleen Cleaver left Eldridge in 1981 and went back to university, receiving a full scholarship from Yale University. She graduated in 1984, Phi Beta Kappa and summa cum laude with a Bachelor of Arts degree in history. In 1987, she divorced Eldridge Cleaver. She had decided she wanted to become a lawyer as she watched the Watergate Hearings in the early 1970s. Therefore, she continued her education by getting her Juris Doctor from Yale Law School in 1989. After graduating, she worked for the law firm of Cravath, Swaine & Moore, and followed this work with numerous jobs, including law clerk in the United States Court of Appeals for the Third Circuit in Philadelphia under Judge A. Leon Higginbotham, the faculty of Emory University in Atlanta, visiting faculty member at the Benjamin N. Cardozo School of Law in New York City, the Graduate School of Yale University and Sarah Lawrence College.

In 2005, Cleaver was selected as an inaugural Fletcher Foundation Fellow. She then worked as a Senior Research Associate at the Yale Law School, and a Senior Lecturer in the African American Studies department at Yale University. She taught at Emory University School of Law before retiring in 2020. Cleaver has worked on numerous activist campaigns, including seeking freedom for death-row inmate Mumia Abu-Jamal and habeas corpus for Geronimo Pratt. In 2022, she published a memoir titled Memories of Love and War. She has been published in numerous newspapers and magazines, including Ramparts, The Black Panther, The Village Voice, The Boston Globe, and Transition, and she has contributed scholarly essays to the books Critical Race Feminism, Critical White Studies, The Promise of Multiculturalism, and The Black Panther Party Reconsidered. She also helped edit Eldridge Cleaver's book, Target Zero: A Life in the Writing.

== See also ==
- The Black Panthers: Vanguard of the Revolution
