= Francis Mazière =

French ethnologist and archaeologist (1924–1994)

- Born: May 24, 1924; Paris, France
- Died: September 18, 1994 (aged 70); Carpentras, France
- Occupations: Archaeologist; ethnologist

Francis Mazière (24 May 1924 – 18 September 1994) was a French ethnologist and archaeologist.

== Career ==
=== Archaeology ===
Specializing in the Amazon, he was also known for his deep knowledge of Polynesian culture and his patient explorations of the Pacific Islands, including the "Fantastic Easter Island". In 1951, he led an expedition into Guyana in Indian territory, crossing the Tumuc-Humac Mountains and discovering unexplored lands in Brazil. In the field, he attempted to unravel the mystery of the moai statues, those mysterious statues erected on Easter Island. He recounted this experience in the best-selling book Fantastique île de Pâques, which sold nearly a million copies and was translated into many languages. He successively explored the cultures of the Sinai, Guyana, Argentina, and the South Pacific. He also contributed to the study of the sounds and dances of Tahiti.

=== Author and publisher ===
In addition to his archaeological activities, he authored books for young audiences, often featuring black and white photographs. One of the most famous, Parana, le petit Indien (illustrated by Dominique Darbois), tells the story of the daily life of an Amazonian child and was published by Nathan in 1953. He was also the long-time director of the Énigmes de l'univers collection and later Portes de l'étrange at Robert Laffont, a period during which the author's and the public's interest in science fiction literature intensified.

Francis Mazière also appeared as an actor in Jacques Becker's film Rendez-vous de juillet in 1949, in which Daniel Gélin played the role of a young ethnologist embarking on his first expedition with difficulty, and Francis played the role of "Frédéric". (Louis Delluc Prize).

== Personal life ==
He had a wife, Tila Mazière, an archaeologist who assisted him and often accompanied him on his explorations.

== Selected works ==
- Francis Mazière (text); Dominique Darbois (photographs) (1953), "Guyane", Expédition Tumuc-Humac (in French), Robert Laffont.
- Francis Mazière (text); Dominique Darbois (photographs) (1953), Indians of Amazonia (in French), Del Duca, p. 76.
- Francis Mazière (text); Dominique Darbois (photographs) (1953), Parana, le petit Indien (in French), Fernand Nathan.
- Francis Mazière (1957), "Life and Death of the Marquesas Islands", L'Archipel du Tiki (in French), Robert Laffont, p. 302, ISBN 978-2-221-03144-5.
- Francis Mazière (text and photographs) (1959), Teïva, enfant des îles (in French), Fernand Nathan.
- Francis Mazière (text and photographs), Hina, la petite Tahitienne (in French), Hachette
