= 9641 Demazière =

Asteroid

Discovery
- Discovered by: E. W. Elst
- Discovery site: La Silla Obs.
- Discovery date: 12 August 1994

Designations
- Named after: Martine De Mazière (Belgian scientist)
- Alternative designations: 1994 PB_{30} · 1997 GY_{36}
- Minor planet category: main-belt · (inner)

Orbital characteristics
- Epoch 4 September 2017 (JD 2458000.5)
- Uncertainty parameter 0
- Observation arc: 25.44 yr (9,292 days)
- Aphelion: 2.7776 AU
- Perihelion: 2.1279 AU
- Semi-major axis: 2.4527 AU
- Eccentricity: 0.1324
- Orbital period (sidereal): 3.84 yr (1,403 days)
- Mean anomaly: 40.595°
- Mean motion: 0° 15^{m} 23.76^{s} / day
- Inclination: 4.7578°
- Longitude of ascending node: 222.02°
- Argument of perihelion: 60.654°

Physical characteristics
- Dimensions: 2.71 km (calculated)
- Synodic rotation period: 9.9121±0.0527 h
- Geometric albedo: 0.20 (assumed)
- Spectral type: S · V
- Absolute magnitude (H): 14.5 · 14.751±0.009 (R) · 14.73±0.22 · 15.2

9641 Demazière, provisional designation 1994 PB_{30}, is a stony asteroid from the inner regions of the asteroid belt, approximately 3 kilometers in diameter. It was discovered by Belgian astronomer Eric Elst at ESO's La Silla Observatory site in northern Chile on 12 August 1994. The asteroid was named for Belgian scientist Martine De Mazière.

== Orbit and classification ==
Demazière orbits the Sun in the inner main-belt at a distance of 2.1–2.8 AU once every 3 years and 10 months (1,403 days). Its orbit has an eccentricity of 0.13 and an inclination of 5° with respect to the ecliptic. A first precovery was obtained by the Steward Observatory at Kitt Peak in 1991, extending the body's observation arc by 3 years prior to its official discovery observation at La Silla.

== Physical characteristics ==
Demazière has been characterized as a V-type asteroid by Pan-STARRS photometric survey.

=== Lightcurves ===
In November 2010, a rotational lightcurve of Demazière was obtained from photometric observations taken at the Palomar Transient Factory in California. It gave a rotation period of 9.9121 hours with a brightness amplitude of 0.9 magnitude (U=2).

=== Diameter and albedo ===
The Collaborative Asteroid Lightcurve Link assumes a standard albedo for stony asteroids of 0.20 and calculates a diameter of 2.7 kilometers with an absolute magnitude of 15.2.

== Naming ==
This minor planet was named in honor of Belgian scientist Martine De Mazière (born 1960), director-general at the Belgian Institute for Space Aeronomy as of 2016. Working with the optical scanning of Earth's atmosphere, her research focuses on the effect of aerosols in the atmosphere's composition. Mazière has also assessed the post-Pinatubo NO_{2} reduction and recovery, using spectroscopic observations in the UV and visible made at the Swiss Sphinx Observatory (Jungfraujoch) over a period of 10 years.

The approved naming citation was published by the Minor Planet Center on 4 May 1999 (M.P.C. 34630).
