= Francis Jeanson =

French activist

- Born: 7 July 1922; Bordeaux, France
- Died: 1 August 2009 (aged 87); Arès, France
- Occupation(s): Philosopher; Journalist; Activist

Francis Jeanson (7 July 1922 – 1 August 2009) was a French political activist known for his commitment to the FLN during the Algerian war.

== Life ==
Although his father's name was Henri, Francis Jeanson was not related to the Henri Jeanson who was a journalist at Le Canard enchaîné, Le Crapouillot, and a screenwriter.

During the Second World War, he escaped through Spain to flee the Service du travail obligatoire and joined the Armée française de la Libération in 1943.

A reporter for the Alger républicain in 1945, he met Albert Camus and Jean-Paul Sartre and the latter entrusted to him the management of the magazine Les Temps modernes from 1951 to 1956. He wrote the critique of The Rebel, which eventually led to ending for good the relationship between Sartre and Camus.

He became acquainted with Emmanuel Mounier, who in 1948 opened for him the doors of the magazine Esprit, where there was a certain 'philocommunism' and who facilitated his entry into the intellectual seraglio of the post-war period. Mounier also invited him to the reading committee of the Éditions du Seuil and recommended him to its literary director, Paul Flamand. At the death of Mounier in March 1950, Jeanson took over the direction of the series "Écrivains de Toujours".

Beginning in 1957, at the height of the Algerian war, he put his anti-colonial ideals into practice by creating the Jeanson network to transport funds to the National Liberation Front of Algeria. This clandestine network of militants was disbanded in 1960. Fleeing abroad, Francis Jeanson was tried in absentia, convicted of high treason, and sentenced in October 1960 to ten years' imprisonment.

He returned to Paris on the occasion of his amnesty in 1966, then worked with the Théâtre de Bourgogne (directed by Jacques Fornier) and was in charge of prefiguring the cultural policy of the Maison de la culture in Chalon-sur-Saône (1967–1971). He proposed and elaborated through this experience the notion of "non-public", which will be resumed in May 1968 in the Declaration of Villeurbanne, of which he was the main editor.

Solicited by psychiatrists, he then led interventions for an open psychiatry, a psychiâtrie du sujet, ("psychiatry of the subject") and created in particular the SOFOR (Sud Ouest Formation Recherche), which developed training activities for caregivers.

In 1992, he became president of the Sarajevo Association, in support of the Bosnian people, and was a candidate on the list Europe Begins at Sarajevo of professor Léon Schwartzenberg for the 1994 European Parliament election.

== Bibliography ==
- 1950: Signification humaine du rire, Éditions du Seuil
- 1951: Montaigne par lui-même, Seuil, Collections Microcosme "Écrivains de toujours", Prix Fénéon in 1953
- 1952: La Phénoménologie
- 1954: La vraie vérité, followed by La Récrimination
- 1955: Sartre par lui-même
- 1955: L'Algérie hors la loi, in collaboration with Colette Jeanson (his wife)
- 1960: Notre guerre, Éditions de Minuit
- 1962: La Révolution algérienne, problèmes et perspectives
- 1963: Lignes de départ
- 1963 :La Foi d'un incroyant, Seuil - ISBN 2020043998
- 1965: Lettre aux femmes
- 1965: Problème le moral et la pensée de Sartre followed by Un quidam nommé Sartre, Seuil
- 1966: Sartre
- 1966: Simone de Beauvoir ou l'entreprise de vivre, Seuil
- 1969: La Foi, with Paul Toinet
- 1973: L'action culturelle dans la cité, Seuil - ISBN 2020021900
- 1974: Sartre dans sa vie : biographie, Seuil - ISBN 2020021161
- 1978: Discours sans méthode, interviews with Henri Laborit
- 1979 Éloge de la psychiatrie, Seuil - ISBN 202005311X
- 1987 La Psychiatrie au tournant, Seuil - ISBN 2020097516
- 1991: Algéries, Seuil - ISBN 2020128616
- 1997: Une exigence de sens (three conversations with Dominique-Emmanuel Blanchard), at Le Bord de l'eau
- 2000: Sartre, Seuil
- 2000: Entre-deux, entretiens avec Christiane Philip, Éditions Le Bord de l'eau
- 2001: Notre guerre, Berg International - ISBN 2911289358
- 2004: Quelle formation, pour quelle psychiatrie ? Vingt ans d'expérience de la SOFOR. Erès, ISBN 978-2749203621. Collective work under the direction of F. Jeanson.
- 2005: La culture pratique du monde, avec Philippe Forest et Patrick Champagne, Editions Cécile Defaut 2005
- 2008–2009: Escales, inédits, Éditions Le Bord de l'eau

== About Francis Jeanson ==
- Marie-Pierre Ulloa, Francis Jeanson. Un intellectuel en dissidence de la Résistance à la guerre d'Algérie, Berg International Editeurs, Paris, 2001, 286 p.
- Marie-Pierre Ulloa, Francis Jeanson: A Dissident Intellectual from the French Resistance to the Algerian War (Palo Alto, Stanford UP, 2008) ISBN 978-0804755085.
- Itinéraire d'un intellectuel engagé, documentary film directed by Catherine de Grissac and Bernard Vrigon of the APDFJ.
- Les valises du professeur Jeanson, biographical essay by Dominique-Emmanuel Blanchard, Éditions Ovadia, 2015

== Filmography ==
- La Chinoise, by Jean-Luc Godard, 1967 (Jeanson plays his own role in a discussion with Anne Wiazemsky)
