= Revolutionary People's Communication Network =

The Revolutionary People's Communication Network was an organization created in 1971 by Kathleen Cleaver and Eldridge Cleaver and their allies after the Cleavers' expulsion from the Black Panther Party while the Cleavers were living in Algeria. It included subgroups such as the UK-based Black Liberation Front.

In an interview with Madeline Wheeler Murphy Kathleen Cleaver stated "The ideological split in the Black Panther Party prevents us from having communication. We are reorganizing to develop a communication/information network through the Revolutionary Peoples Communication Network." She moved back to the United States to promote the organization.

The group published a newspaper called Babylon as well as other publications including Humanity, Freedom, Peace a collection of works by Geronimo Pratt.
