= Jeanson network =

French leftwing militant group

The Jeanson network (French: réseau Jeanson) was a group of French leftwing militants led by Francis Jeanson who helped Algerian National Liberation Front agents operating in the French metropolitan territory during the Algerian War. They were mainly involved in carrying money and papers for the Algerians and were sometimes called "the suitcase carriers" (les porteurs de valises), a notion from the French resistance movement during World War II. The communist anticolonialist activist Henri Curiel participated in the network, as did the forger Adolfo Kaminsky. The philosopher Jean-Paul Sartre and writer Simone de Beauvoir were supportive of the Jeanson network. Photojournalist and author Dominique Darbois was another intellectual in Jeanson's network.

== Notable suitcase carriers ==
- Francis Jeanson
- Henri Curiel
- Jacques Vergès
- Dominique Darbois
- Hélène Cuenat

== See also ==
- Anti-colonialism
