= Dominique Darbois =

French photojournalist and author

Dominique Darbois (5 April 1925 – 6 September 2014) was a French photojournalist and author, noted for her humanist studies of diverse locales, artifacts, children, and colonized peoples.

Darbois was born in Paris and during the Second World War was active in the Free French Forces. She was imprisoned for two years in the Cité de Muette housing estate in Drancy near Paris, which had become an internment camp. On liberation in 1944 she received the Croix de Guerre for her work with the French Resistance.

In 1946 Darbois began photographing professionally, beginning with journalism work in Cambodia. From 1949 to the end of her life, she worked throughout the world, including Laos, Indonesia, the USSR, Australia, Mexico, Guatemala, Algeria, Iran, and the Congo. In 1952, she received the “Prix Exploration” from the President of the French Republic. In the course of her many voyages, Darbois often declared herself annoyed with "le colonialisme européen," and has involved herself with "anti-colonialist struggles" in Indochina, Algeria and in Cuba. During the Algerian period, she involved herself with the network of Réseau Jeanson.

From 1952 through 1978, she completed 20 books for the collection Les Enfants du Monde [Children of the World], with the publishing group Fernand Nathan in Paris. These books are typically oversized quarto volumes featuring candid black-and-white photographs of children from various cultures and nationalities, often naked or scantily attired. Titles include "Agossou, le petit Africain" ("Agossou, the little African", published in English as "Agossou, a Boy of Africa" and "Agossou: His Life in Africa"); "Parana, le petit Indien", "Faouzi: Boy of Egypt," "Natacha, Girl of Russia," and "Nick in Tahiti." Beyond the juvenile market, she has published books about Amazon Indians, African sculpture, Chinese landscape painting, Egyptian art and Oriental carpets. In the late 1960s she did a number of publications of her work on Afghanistan art, including L’Afghanistan et son art (Editions Cercle d’Art, Paris, 1968), and Afghanistan und Seine Kunst (Artia Press, Prague, 1968).

Darbois had her first solo exhibition in 1951 in Paris. From 1984, she held numerous exhibitions of her African photography and her work on women of different cultures. In the late 1990s, she did a major exhibition on women called Regards de Femmes.

Darbois died on 6 September 2014 at the age of 89.
