= Claude Dubar =

French sociologist (1945–2015)

- Born: 11 December 1945
- Died: 29 September 2015 (aged 69)
- Occupation: Sociologist teacher at the Versailles Saint-Quentin-en-Yvelines University
- Known for: Sociologist

Claude Dubar (11 December 1945 – 29 September 2015) was a French sociologist.

== Biography ==
After his teaching experience at Beirut, Lebanon in 1974, he joined the French National Centre for Scientific Research and became Docent at the Lille University of Science and Technology in 1977. His thesis, under the direction of Raymond Boudon, focuses on vocational training in France

In 1988, he joined the Centre d'études et de recherches sur les qualifications (Centre for Studies and Research on Qualifications) in Paris, which researches topics close to those already studied by Claude Dubar: in particular, relations between the sociology of education and work, and especially the sociology of professional identities.

After 1993 he was a sociology teacher at the Versailles Saint-Quentin-en-Yvelines University.

== Research topics ==
=== Professional identities ===
At the heart of Dubar's work are professional identities. Beyond industrial sociology, it is a sociology of professional identities in which he tries to implement in order to better analyze the crisis that characterizes today's professional identity. Indeed, professional identity confronts the processes by which modernity evolves, such as the rationalization process that characterizes the contemporary economy.

=== Reflections on socialization ===
In a more general way, Claude Dubar reflects on the socialization process with particular instances of professional identity. However, in his book La Socialisation, construction Des identités sociales et professionnelles (The Socialisation, building social and professional identities), he attacks the genesis of an identity matrix and its construction in early childhood. To do so, he theorizes a distinction between "self identity" and "identity to others."

== Bibliography ==
- Faire de la sociologie, un parcours d'enquêtes (Doing sociology, a survey path), 2006.
- Sociologie des professions (Sociology of professions), 2005.
- Analyser les entretiens biographiques (Analyze the biographical interviews), with Didier Demazière, 2004. (ISBN 2763781349)
- La Socialisation, construction des identités sociales et professionnelles (Socialization, construction of social and professional identities), 2002, Armand Colin. (ISBN 2-200-26448-8)
- La Crise des identités (Crisis of Identity), 2001. (ISBN 978-2-13-056220-7), 2010, PUF. (ISBN 978-2-13-058365-3)
- La Promotion sociale en France (Social Promotion in France), with Charles Gadea, 1999.
- Genèse et dynamique des groupes professionnels (Genesis and dynamic professional groups), with Yvette Lucas, 1994.
- La Formation professionnelle continue (Continuing Professional Education), thesis, 1984.
