= Martine De Mazière =

Belgian atmospheric scientist

Martine De Mazière (born 1960) is a Belgian atmospheric scientist known for her work in atmospheric satellite observations. She is director general ad interim of the Belgian Institute for Space Aeronomy.

Asteroid 9641 Demazière was named after De Mazière in 1999. She was elected to the Royal Flemish Academy of Belgium for Science and the Arts in 2011.
