= Didier Demazière =

French sociologist

- Born: Demazière
- Occupation: Senior Researcher
- Employer: Centre national de la recherche scientifique (France)
- Known for: Sociologist

Didier Demazière is a French sociologist specializing in the study of unemployment; in 2012, he was a Senior Researcher at the French National Centre for Scientific Research., assigned to the Centre de sociologie des organisations (CSO, in English Centre for the Sociology of Organizations), in partnership with Sciences Po.

== Research topics ==
=== For a sociology of unemployment? ===
As an industrial sociologist, he became interested in the field through the analysis of unemployment, in particular, questioning the emergence of a professional identity of the unemployed. As such, he is also interested in other emerging fields claiming "pseudo-professional" identities; for example, he has worked around the status of free software developer in a free software community and questioned the reasons for such a commitment, hesitating between volunteering, activism and professionalism.

== Bibliography ==
- L'injonction au professionnalisme. Analyse d'une dynamique plurielle (The injunction to professionalism: Analysis of a plural dynamic), with Valérie Boussard and Philip Milburn, (2010).
- Sociologie des groupes professionnels. Acquis récents, nouveaux défis (Sociology of professional groups. Recent achievements, new challenges), with Charles Gadéa, (2009).
- Sociologie des chômeurs (Sociology of the unemployed), (2006), (ISBN 978-2707148926)
- Analyses textuelles en sociologie. Logiciels, méthodes, usages (Textual analysis in sociology. Software, methods, uses), (2006).
- Analyser les entretiens biographiques (Analyzing biographical interviews), with Claude Dubar, 2004. (ISBN 2763781349)
- Le chômage. Comment peut-on être chômeur ? (Unemployment. How can you be unemployed?), (2003).
- Chômeurs: du silence à la révolte. Sociologie d'une action collective (Unemployed: from silence to revolt. Sociology of collective action), with Maria Teresa Pignoni, (1999).
- Le chômage de longue durée (Long-term unemployment), (1995).
- La sociologie du chômage (The sociology of unemployment), (1995).
- Longue durée. Vivre en chômage (Long-term. Living in unemployment), with Marc Helleboid and Jacques Mondoloni, (1994).
- Le chômage en crise? La négociation des identités des chômeurs de longue durée (Unemployment in crisis? Negotiation of the identities of the long-term unemployed), (1992)
