= Museum of Performance & Design =

Museum in San Francisco, California, U.S.

Coordinates: 37°46′46.59″N 122°25′13.96″W

The Museum of Performance + Design, formerly the San Francisco Performing Arts Library & Museum, is located in the Bayview District of San Francisco, California at 2200 Jerrold Avenue, Ste. T. The Museum collects and makes accessible materials about the performing arts, with a special emphasis on documenting and preserving the San Francisco Bay Area’s rich and diverse performing arts heritage from the Gold Rush to the present. The museum produces public and educational programs, provides library services to researchers, and conservation and archival services to performing arts institutions. The Museum's collection includes personal papers of prominent artists, original costumes and design renderings, audio-visual recordings of live performances, original artwork, other artifacts, and ephemera. The Museum also serves as the official archives for many local performing arts organizations including the San Francisco Ballet, San Francisco Opera, Stern Grove Festival, and the San Francisco Ethnic Dance Festival.

== Mission ==
The mission of the Museum of Performance + Design is to preserve the history of the performing arts in the Bay Area and promote their live and theatrical qualities. The Museum archives, collects and interprets materials, information and experiences that are locally connected and broadly relevant. By providing dynamic opportunities to diverse audiences, MP+D supports and cultivates engagement, participation, and innovation in the performing arts.

== History ==
More than sixty years ago, Russell Hartley started a private collection in his home with the purpose of collecting and preserving material documenting the history of dance. Mr. Hartley, who was both a dancer and costume designer for the San Francisco Ballet in the 1940s and 1950s, searched second-hand shops, traveled to Europe to purchase dance artifacts, and in 1947, established the San Francisco Dance Archives. As the collection grew, it expanded to include all of the performing arts and in 1975 moved into a branch of the San Francisco public library system as the Archives for the Performing Arts. In 1983, the growing collection was moved to the Opera House, giving the collection 1,000 square feet (93 m^{2}) for storage. At his passing, Mr. Hartley bequeathed his collection to the Archives. At that time, a board was developed and 2 full-time professional staff laid the groundwork toward the creation of an institution.

In 1989, the collection was moved to a larger facility in the Civic Center area. The facility underwent extensive renovation to accommodate the collection, and, at the same time, the organization took a new name: the San Francisco Performing Arts Library & Museum (SFPALM). SFPALM's new home enabled the organization to have onsite exhibitions and to hold lectures, classes, and special events. The collection continued to grow, and in 1999, SFPALM moved to the Veterans Building in the San Francisco War Memorial and Performing Arts Center. This larger space better accommodated the growing collection, expanded staff, and ever increasing number of researchers using its resources.

In 2007, on the occasion of its 60th anniversary, the organization changed its name to the Museum of Performance + Design to more accurately reflect the organization’s growing mission. In the summer of 2013, the Veterans Building was closed for seismic upgrading and renovation, and after an extensive search, the Museum moved to its current south of Market location on Folsom Street near the Yerba Buena Center for the Arts. The organization continues to collect, preserve, and make available to the public its collection of 3.5 million items and its programs documenting the diverse cultural legacy of the performing arts in the Bay Area and beyond.

The Museum of Performance + Design is an independent nonprofit organization that relies on a variety of funding sources, including memberships, corporate, foundation and individual gifts. It is also funded in part by the Grants for the Arts program of the San Francisco Hotel Tax Fund, and the National Endowment for the Arts.

== Performing Arts Library ==
The Museum of Performance & Design Performing Arts Library is dedicated to collecting, preserving and making available to the public materials documenting a broad spectrum of the live performing arts and theatrical design. The more than three and a half million items in the Archives, Reference Collection, Special Collections, and Theatrical Design Collection include books, periodicals, playbills, clippings, photographs, posters, sheet music, plays and libretti, radio interviews, videotapes, musical theater recordings, the Legacy Oral History program, theatrical design research materials, costume and set designs, personal papers of performers and patrons, as well as the archives of several local organizations. An online catalog contains a portion of the materials available at the Museum of Performance & Design Performing Arts Library.

Archives: The Library holds the archives of several of the areas most significant performing arts organizations past and present including: Lamplighters, Loring Club, Merola Opera Program, Pickle Family Circus, San Francisco Ballet, San Francisco Ethnic Dance Festival, San Francisco Municipal Chorus, San Francisco Musical Club, San Francisco Opera, Stern Grove Festival, and others.

Reference Collection: The reference collection includes published materials that support core subject areas in Special Collections, the Museum’s exhibitions, and existing major holdings such as sheet music and musical theater.

Special Collections: The special collections include materials which document individuals, productions, organizations, and/or genres significant to performing arts in California, with particular emphasis on the San Francisco Bay Area. This includes the biographical files on individual actors, dancers, musicians, composers, conductors, choreographers, singers and other performing artists who have performed in the Bay Area from the Gold Rush to the present, personal papers of performers, patrons, and creators including Lew Christensen and Gisella Caccialanza, Phil Elwood, Alexander Fried, Anna Halprin, Calvin Simmons, Michael Smuin, and Gladys Swarthout, and others, theater film archives of theater performances in the Bay Area from the mid-80’s to the present including ACT, Berkeley Repertory, San Jose Repertory, American Musical Theater of San Jose, 42nd Street Moon, California Shakespeare Festival, and others and photographic collections including Kurt Herbert Adler, Lillian Bauer, Donald Coney, Thomas Curran, Edgar Foster Daniels, Harry Jew, Katherine Kahrs, Chester Kessler, Henri McDowell, Bob McLeod, Robert Millard, John Morrissey, Alexander Murray, Ida Nevis, Ira Nowinski, Ron Scherl, Bernard Taper, Enid Thompson, Tom Zimberoff, Chris Wahlberg, Max Waldman, Wylie Wong, Sandra Woodall, and others.

Theatrical Design Research Collection: contains more than 25,000 books, periodicals, fashion plates, hand-colored engravings and 35 volumes of postcards documenting centuries of theatrical costumes, theater architecture, set and costume design, masks, and fashion and clothing ranging from Japanese kimono to African tribal dress, and original designs from Boris Aronson, Cecil Beaton, Eugene Berman, Stewart Chaney, Elizabeth Dalton, Iris de Luce, Judith Dolan, Julian Dove, Raul Du Bois, Roger Furse, Howard Greer, Russell Hartley, Jesse Hollis, Eiko Ishioka, Romaine Johnston, Willa Kim, Peter Larkin, Oliver Messel, Beni Montresor, William Pitkin, Peter Rice, Douglas Russell, Irene Sharaff, Antonio Sotomayor, Jose Varona, Tony Walton, Walter Watson, and others.

== Exhibitions ==
Throughout its history, the Museum has presented exhibitions on a wide range of performing arts-related topics from performers, creators, and companies to performance venues, genres, and productions.

Previous exhibitions include: A Portrait of the Cuban Ballet School (2013),Body In-Sight: Action Drawings from the Dance Studio (2012), More Life! Angels in America at Twenty(2010),Somethin's Happening Here: Bay Area Rock 'n' Roll 1963-1973 (2009), "Star Quality: The World of Noël Coward" (2008), Hello, Carol!: A Celebration of Carol Channing (2008),Enrico Banducci's hungry i: San Francisco's Legendary Nightclub (2007), In Character: Actors Acting (2006), Harlem of the West: The San Francisco Fillmore Jazz Era (2006), Irving Berlin's Show Business: Broadway (2005), Painted Men: Chinese Opera Backstage (2005), Madame Butterfly: From Puccini to Miss Saigon (2004), George Balanchine: Ballet Master (2004), America's Dance Treasures: The First 100 (February - May 2004), Kronos @ 30: Thirty Years of Kronos Quartet (January - June 2003), Hirschfeld: A Centennial Celebration. Treasures from the Hirschfeld Archive (July - December 2003) and With a Song in His Heart: A Celebration of Richard Rodgers (April - September 2002), Princely Designs: Judith Dolan Designs for Hal Prince (1999).

== Programming ==
"Conversations with Artists:" John Adams (composer) (2003), Hildegard Behrens (1999), Joanna Berman (1996), Brian Boitano (1997), Barbara Bonney (1999), Richard Bonynge (1997), Christopher Bruce (1997), Betty Buckley (1997), Val Caniparoli (1998), Daniel Cantor (1996), Len Cariou (2002), Carol Channing (1995), Ted Chapin (2002), Evelyn Cisneros (1996), Barbara Cook (1996), Judith Dolan (1999), Patty Duke (2010), Nancy Dussault (1999), Suzanne Farrell (2004), Anna Halprin (2006), Paul Gemignani (1997), Bill Irwin (2001), Judith Jamison (1998), Kendra Kassebaum (2010), Tony Kushner (2010), Tiny LeBlanc (2009), Stephen Legate (1996), Elizabeth Loscavio (1996), Patti LuPone (1999), Natalia Makarova (2000), Maureen McGovern (2002), Donna McKechnie (1995), Kevin McKenzie (dancer) (1997), Yehudi Menuhin (1995), Arthur Mitchell (dancer)(2004), Mark Morris (2009), Mark Nelson (1996), Kyra Nichols (2004), David Palmer (1996), John Raitt (1997), Samuel Ramey (1994), Anthony Randazzo (1996), Rondi Reed (1996) Terry Riley (2003), Mary Rodgers (2002), Donald Runnicles (1994), Leonie Rysanek (1993), Lea Salonga (2004), Stephen Schwartz (composer) (2009), Ted Shank (2000), Christopher Stowell (1996), Joan Sutherland (1997), Paul Taylor (choreographer) (2004), Blanche Thebom (1993), Helgi Tomasson (1997), Carol Vaness (1999), Frederica von Stade (1993), Tony Walton (2011), Teal Wicks (2010), Sandra Woodall (1998)

== Awards ==
=== San Francisco Arts Medallion ===
The San Francisco Arts Medallion was created by the Museum, in 2005, to recognize those individuals whose leadership, actions, and generosity have benefited the cultural life of the Bay Area, especially in the performing arts. Recipients of the San Francisco Arts Medallion include Stanlee Gatti (2005), Gordon Getty (2006), Diane B. Wilsey (2007), Lucy and Fritz Jewett (2008), The Hon. Willie L. Brown, Jr. (2009), Nancy Hellman Bechtle (2010), Delia Fleishhacker Ehrlich (2011), Roselyne Swig (2012), and John Goldman (2013).

== Articles ==
- Howard, Rachel. "S.F. Ballet's corps in awe of alumni." San Francisco Chronicle
- Rubin, Sylvia. "Arts Library Director Named." San Francisco Gate
- Workman, Bill. "S.F. Arts Library Embraces American Musicals Collection." San Francisco Gate
