= Marin County Civic Center =

Buildings in California, United States

- U.S. National Register of Historic Places
- U.S. National Historic Landmark
- California Historical Landmark
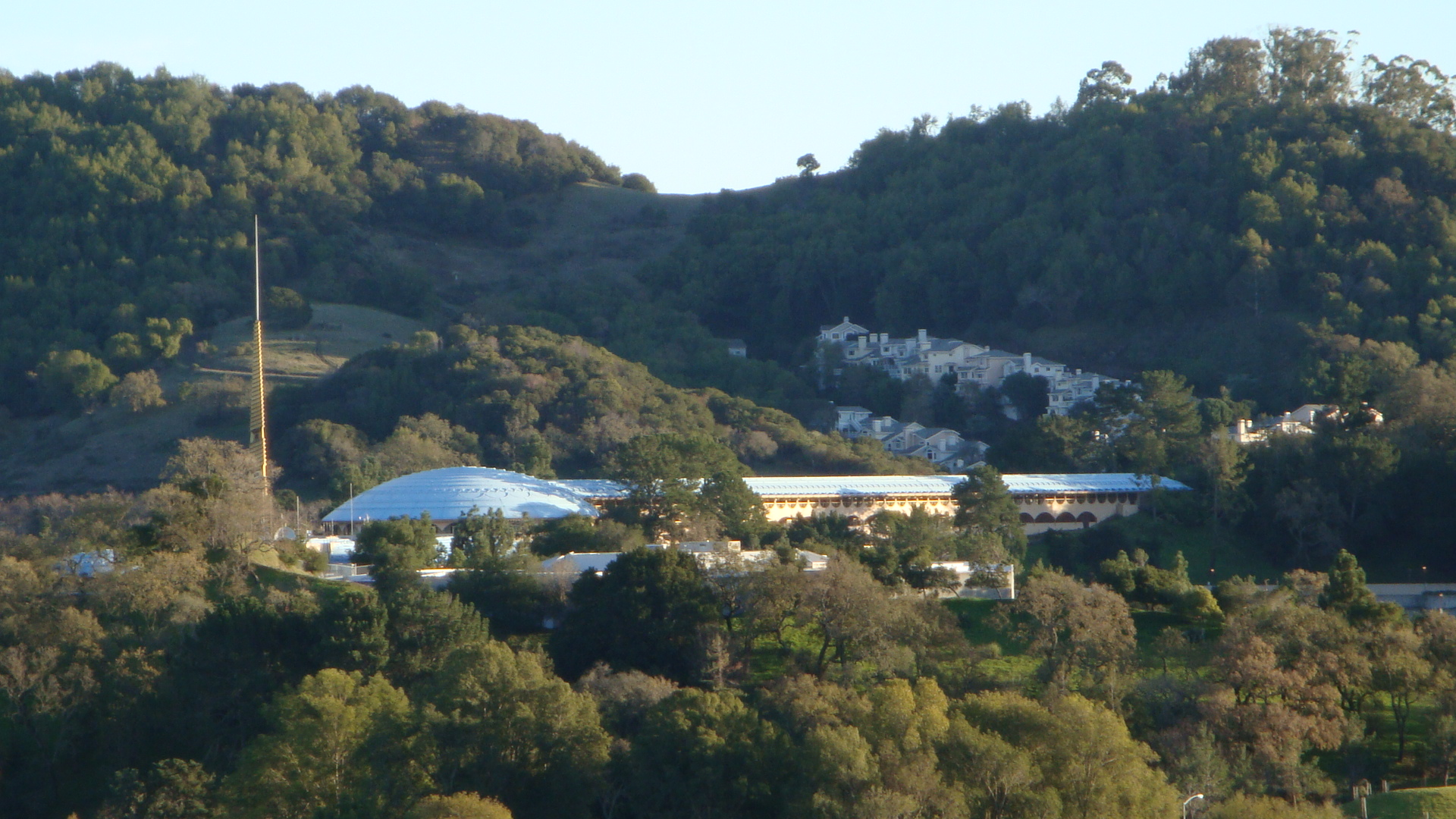

- Location within San Francisco Bay Area Location within California Location within the United States
- Location: San Rafael, California
- Coordinates: 37°59′51″N 122°31′49″W
- Area: 140 acres (57 ha) (entire complex); 81.5 acres (33.0 ha) (landmark designation)
- Built: 1960–1976
- Architects: Frank Lloyd Wright; Taliesin Associated Architects
- Architectural style: Modern Movement
- NRHP reference No.: 91002055
- CHISL No.: 999

Significant dates
- Added to NRHP: July 17, 1991
- Designated NHL: July 17, 1991
- Designated CHISL: May 8, 1991

The Marin County Civic Center is a governmental complex in San Rafael, the county seat of Marin County, California, United States. Designed by Frank Lloyd Wright and Taliesin Associated Architects (TAA), the 140-acre (57 ha) complex consists of several buildings constructed between 1960 and 1976. The main building consists of two connected wings: the Administration Building to the south and the Hall of Justice to the north. The Civic Center campus also includes an armory, a post office, the Veterans Memorial Auditorium, an exhibition hall, a lagoon, and fairgrounds.

The site was acquired in 1956, and Wright was hired a year later. The development process was complicated by disputes between Marin County's supervisors, and Wright died in 1959 before design was completed. Groundbreaking for the Civic Center took place in 1960, and the armory opened the next year. Both the Administration Building and post office were completed in 1962. After the Hall of Justice opened in 1969, a hostage attack and a bombing took place there the next year, prompting various upgrades and security measures. The Veterans Memorial Auditorium opened in 1971, and the exhibition hall opened in 1976. Since then, the buildings have undergone multiple renovations. A new jail was added in the 1990s following much controversy, and plans for a permanent farmers' market facility were put forth in the 2010s and 2020s.

The main building has pink stucco walls with several levels of arches, topped by a blue roof. The shorter Administration Building wing and the longer Hall of Justice are joined at a 120° angle by a rotunda with a spire. Inside are county offices, courtrooms in the Hall of Justice, atria in both wings, and a library and cafeteria in the rotunda. The post office, a curved structure, has a lobby and curved mailroom. The auditorium, topped by a dome, has a main hall with a flexible layout, in addition to a smaller auditorium and an exhibition space. The armory and exhibition hall both contain various rooms for military and exhibition use, respectively. Over the years, the complex's architecture has received mixed commentary, though employees generally liked the design. The Civic Center's main building, lagoon, and post office are designated as a California Historical Landmark and National Historic Landmark.

== Site ==
The Marin County Civic Center covers 140 acres (57 ha) just north of San Rafael in Marin County, within the San Francisco Bay Area in California, United States. The complex includes multiple buildings, roads, and landscape features, all developed around the preexisting topography as part of a master plan. The complex is located next to the US 101 freeway (from which it is readily visible), and the Marin Civic Center station of Sonoma–Marin Area Rail Transit (SMART) is located nearby.

=== Landscape features ===
The parcel comprised a relatively flat area, surrounded by rolling hills with oak trees and grass. When the complex was being designed, its architect Frank Lloyd Wright decided to erect the main building on the hills. He also suggested planting deodar cedar trees, planted by local Boy Scouts, who accidentally burned down the trees they planted. The Administration Building is constructed on three hills. As a result, an access road to the complex's parking area (now Peter Behr Drive) runs underneath the Administration Building. There is also a memorial to Judge Harold Haley, a victim of the 1970 Civic Center attack; the memorial includes a granite boulder surrounded by curved benches.

Other landscape features occupy the flat portions of the site. The complex's eastern end includes an artificial lagoon, which measures 11 acres (4.5 ha). (Note: Other sources cited the lagoon as measuring 10 acres (4.0 ha), 12 acres (4.9 ha), or 14 acres (5.7 ha).) The lagoon was originally a marsh supplied by a natural spring, which was modified when the Civic Center was built in the 1960s. The marsh was deemed unsuitable for development, and it was dredged to create the lagoon and provide fill for other parts of the complex. The lagoon was intended to accommodate fishing from the start, and a playground was built there. At the northern end of the Civic Center complex, next to the lagoon, is an 80-acre (32 ha) county fairground. The fairground hosts events such as the annual Marin County Fair and twice-weekly farmers' markets.

== Development ==
The population of Marin County more than doubled between 1930 and 1950 and had nearly doubled once again by 1960. The county government had offices in 12 or 13 buildings by the early 1950s, and the offices' disparate locations made coordination difficult. The county rented much of the space it occupied, which cost the government $60,000 a year by 1960. (Note: Equivalent to $500,000 in 2025) Studies for a new civic center began in 1952, at which point there was a competing proposal for an expansion of the Marin County Courthouse in the county seat of San Rafael. Marin County's board of supervisors agreed in September 1952 to host referendums on a $3.5 million civic center bond issue and a $1.5 million courthouse bond issue, but voters rejected both proposals. The board instead instituted an ad valorem tax to pay for expenses as they arose. That year saw the election of Vera Schultz, a major proponent of the civic center. Schultz and three of the board's four other supervisors supported the civic center plan, while the fourth, William Fusselman, consistently opposed it.

=== Site selection ===
In April 1953, the board appointed a citizens' committee, which was tasked with selecting sites for a civic center and county fairground. After considering three fairground locations, the committee recommended in December 1953 that the board acquire Henry and Virginia Scettrini's 130-acre (53 ha) ranch on US 101 near Santa Venetia. The committee further recommended in April 1954 that a 20-acre (8.1 ha) civic center be built on the fairground. That June, the local chamber of commerce endorsed the civic center plan. The Scettrini family refused to give the board an option on the land and rejected the county's first two offers.

The board initiated condemnation proceedings in December 1954, offering $2,000 per acre ($4,900/ha) for 65 acres (26 ha), (Note: Equivalent to $19,000 per acre ($47,000 per hectare) in 2025) only to learn that developers had offered 45% more for the same land. Given the monetary shortfalls, the board debated how much land to acquire. After the state government provided $100,000, (Note: Equivalent to $0.9 million in 2025) the board moved to condemn all 130 acres that December. The board then decided to expedite the acquisition by purchasing the land. The county offered $250,000 in March 1955, (Note: Equivalent to $2.3 million in 2025) amounting to $1,923 per acre ($4,750/ha). (Note: Equivalent to $18,000 per acre ($44,000 per hectare) in 2025) After the offer expired the following month, the board proceeded with condemnation. The board narrowly voted in August to resume purchase negotiations, with the county's district attorney as their representative.

The Scettrinis conditionally accepted the county's offer of $2,850 per acre ($7,000/ha) in October, (Note: Equivalent to $27,000 per acre ($66,000 per hectare) in 2025) and the California State Legislature's counsel determined in December that Marin County governmental offices could indeed be moved to the civic center. Although the board wanted to acquire the land without encumbrance, the Scettrinis wished to retain half the site's mineral rights. The board voted in February 1956 to buy the site for $412,621. (Note: Equivalent to $3.7 million in 2025) (Note: One source gives a different amount of $531,416, equivalent to $4.8 million in 2025. Another source rounds the purchase price to $426,000, equivalent to $3.9 million in 2025.) The county auditor refused to complete the purchase, since the county offices could not be relocated outside San Rafael (the county seat), but a county judge ruled the next month that the Scettrini ranch was legally at San Rafael, the closest city. The land was then annexed to San Rafael. The acquisition, partly financed by about $241,000 from the state's fairground fund, (Note: Equivalent to $2.2 million in 2025) was finalized on April 26, 1956. The site covered 138.78 acres (56.16 ha), though a neighboring landowner had laid claim to 10.16 acres (4.11 ha) of that area. In exchange, the county agreed to construct at least one building within three years.

=== Planning ===
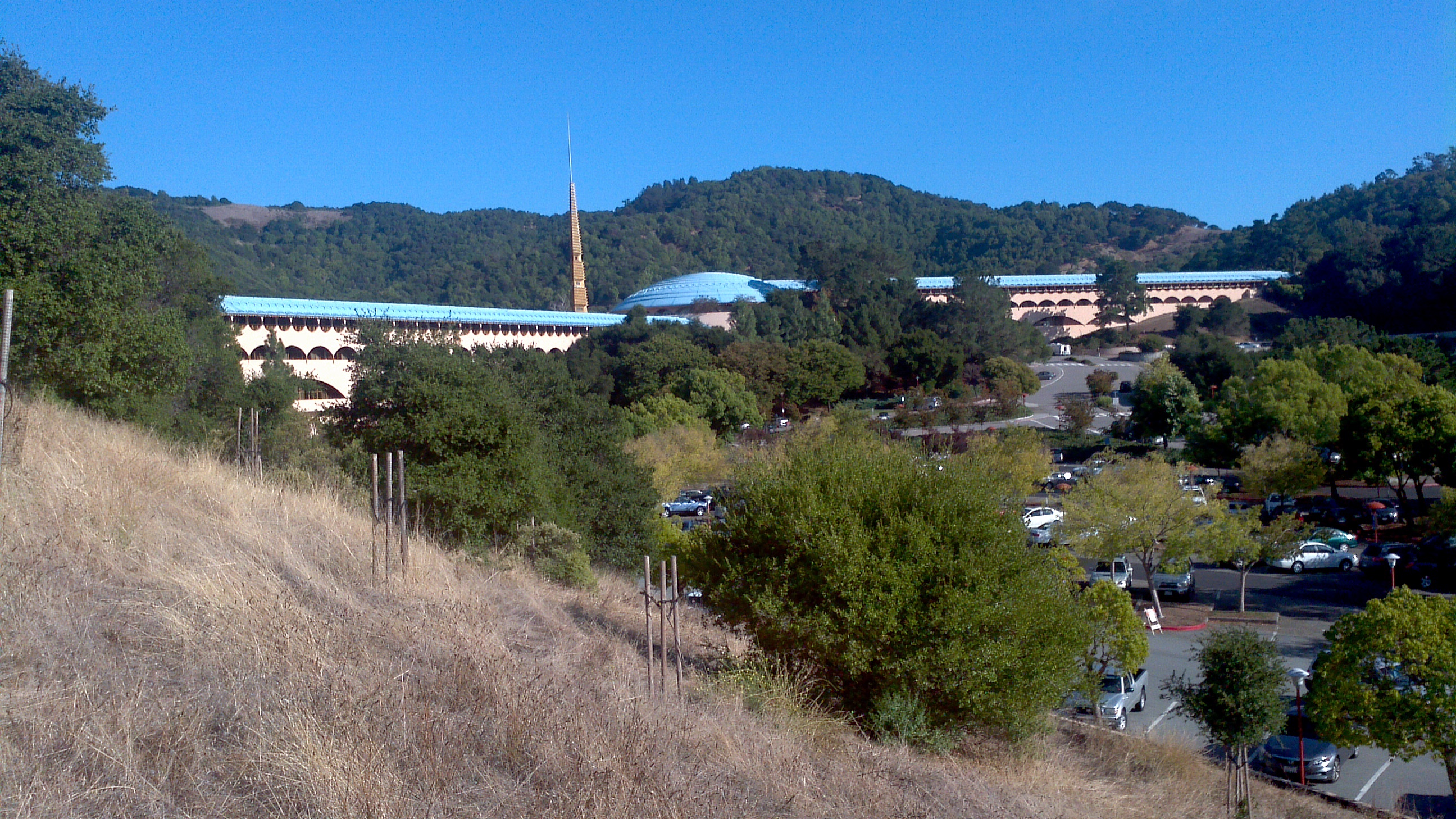
Main Civic Center building, with the Hall of Justice on the left, and the Administration Building on the right, of the rotunda and spire

The board of supervisors agreed in June 1956 to request a planning grant from the Housing and Home Finance Agency (HHFA). That September, the board approved a preliminary plan and received a $45,000 HHFA grant. (Note: Equivalent to $408,000 in 2025) The terms of the grant required that plans and cost estimates be completed in three months. In October, the board announced plans for United States Armed Forces facilities, after the Navy and Marine Corps requested space at the complex.

==== Architect selection ====
While planning proceeded, an architectural selection committee interviewed 26 firms. There are conflicting accounts as to whether Wright was among those interviewed, (Note: See: Sources attesting Wright's initial involvement: Sources disputing it:) with the board considering him too old and his work too expensive. Nonetheless, by early 1957, county officials were discussing with Wright's associate Aaron Green. Four supervisors and the architecture committee met with Wright that April. The board approved negotiations with Wright on June 26 and voted to formally hire Wright on July 26. Supervisor Donald Jensen said the commission would give Marin County "an internationally-famous civic center". On July 30, Wright accepted the commission with a public question-and-answer session. At the time, he was 88 years old and in his final years, but was still busy with multiple projects including the Plan for Greater Baghdad.

The complex was to cost about $10 million, (Note: Equivalent to $87.5 million in 2025) (Note: The Daily Independent Journal gives a more specific figure of $9.5127 million (about $80.245 million in 2025). Other sources cite different figures: The whole project at $11 million (about $92.791 million in 2025).; The Civic Center at $9 million (about $75.920 million in 2025), and the fairground at $3 million (about $25.307 million in 2025).) on which Wright charged a 10% architectural fee, 2% higher than peers such as Richard Neutra. Wright's fee attracted objections from residents and Fusselman, and other opposition came from the American Legion and local groups, who tried to discredit him because of his antiwar activism. Opponents unearthed a seven-page report that labeled Wright a communist supporter, and County Clerk George Jones read this report on August 2, at the board meeting to confirm Wright's appointment. Wright left the room in protest, but Mary Summers, a member of the architectural committee, convinced Wright to stay. Jones was unable to procure Wright's contract, but the board president signed a carbon copy. Schultz claimed Jones had purposely conspired against Wright by deliberately losing the contract and by allowing the Matthews report to be read before the contract was signed.

==== Design ====
Wright began working on the design immediately, inspecting the site before the contract was even signed. Wisconsin legislator Carroll Metzner, another of Wright's opponents, visited California that August, seeking to reverse Wright's commission. Wright submitted his first report on the Civic Center in November 1957; the report proposed developing the complex in five phases through 1974. John Howe and Ling Po assisted Wright in designing the first two phases, which were announced publicly in March 1958. The plans called for a V-shaped structure within the hills, spanning several bridges and measuring three stories high. There would also be a 300-foot-high (91 m) triangular mast, a dome, and a jail disguised by the landscape. Some offices would be built during the first phase, and police station, courts, and jail facilities would built by 1969. Drawings of the plan were publicly exhibited in early April 1958. Opponents formed a taxpayer association to collect signatures for a referendum, seeking to cancel Wright's commission because of concerns over cost overruns. The association's efforts were ultimately unsuccessful. Supporters produced a short film about the plans and formed the Citizens Committee for the County Center.

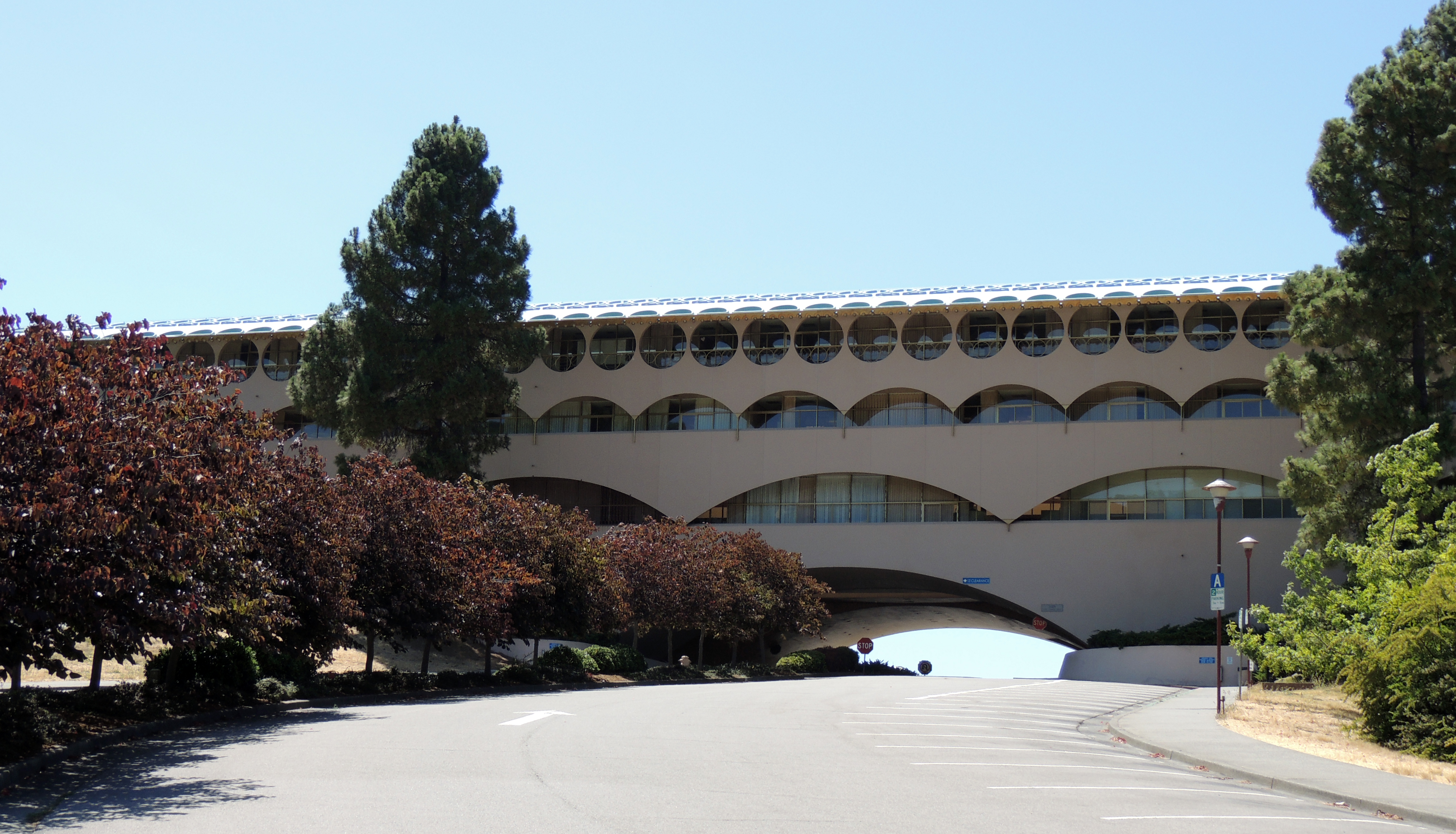
The Administration Building (pictured) was still in design when Wright died in 1959.

The board of supervisors authorized Wright to create detailed designs for the first two phases on April 28, 1958; these phases were to cost $4.124 million. (Note: Equivalent to $34.8 million in 2025) The three final phases had yet to be approved, and cost estimates had not been devised for them. By June Wright had already been paid $147,000 for his work to date, (Note: Equivalent to $1,256,000 in 2025) and in August, the board authorized Wright to design the amphitheater and county fair pavilion. Work on detailed drawings proceeded throughout the year. Wright revised the plans; for example, escalators were shortened to save money, and designs for the county fair buildings were revised to meet the county's requirements. The Civic Center's costs remained contentious, and local citizens formed associations in a continued attempt to remove Wright. There were also ongoing discussions over whether to build a veterans' memorial auditorium at the Civic Center, though some veterans objected to Wright's involvement, citing his war record.

In March 1959, the board appointed Wright to design a post office at the complex. Wright died the next month, at which point the plans were 90% complete. Taliesin Associated Architects (TAA), the successor firm to Wright's practice, was enlisted to complete the Civic Center, and Green and Wright's son-in-law William Wesley Peters of TAA took over the design. Fusselman attempted to reduce the architectural fee by 2%, but the other supervisors gave TAA the contract without changing the fee. Fusselman also unsuccessfully requested the plans as they had been at Wright's death. The board approved a proposal that April to allow fill to be delivered to the site for landscaping. TAA submitted the first-phase plans to the board that September.

=== Construction ===
In November 1959, the supervisors approved the blueprints and began soliciting bids for construction. The construction contract was awarded the next month to the lowest bidder, Rothschild, Raffin & Weirick, a San Francisco contractor. Rothschild, Raffin & Weirick's bid of $3,638,735, including $596,470 for site development, (Note: The total cost is equivalent to $30.7 million, and the site development cost equivalent to $5.0 million, in 2025.) came in slightly under the original budget estimate. Simultaneously, the supervisors filed condemnation proceedings for four adjoining parcels, obtaining these parcels by early 1960. The United States Postal Service (USPS) signed a 50-year ground lease for its proposed post office that January, paying a nominal fee of $1 annually. The groundbreaking ceremony for the Administration Building on February 15, 1960, was attended by 500 guests including Wright's widow Olgivanna, son Lloyd, and grandson Eric. The same year, the state leased the complex's southeast corner for an armory.

The Civic Center's construction became a point of political contention. Two supervisors, Schultz and Jim Marshall, lost reelection that June to two Civic Center skeptics; the outgoing supervisors voted shortly afterward to continue construction. The same month, Herrero Brothers of San Francisco received a $153,093 contract to build the armory. (Note: Equivalent to $1,275,000 in 2025.) Excavations progressed quickly, and workers had finished grading the parking lots and were preparing to construct the Administration Building's side walls by August. The supervisors ordered fire alarms and vaults for the Administration Building, and they commissioned furniture through the state's prison apprenticeship program, since prison-made furniture was inexpensive but was available only to public agencies. That December, the supervisors learned that another $1.2 million would need to be raised to complete the Civic Center's first phase. (Note: Equivalent to $10.0 million in 2025)

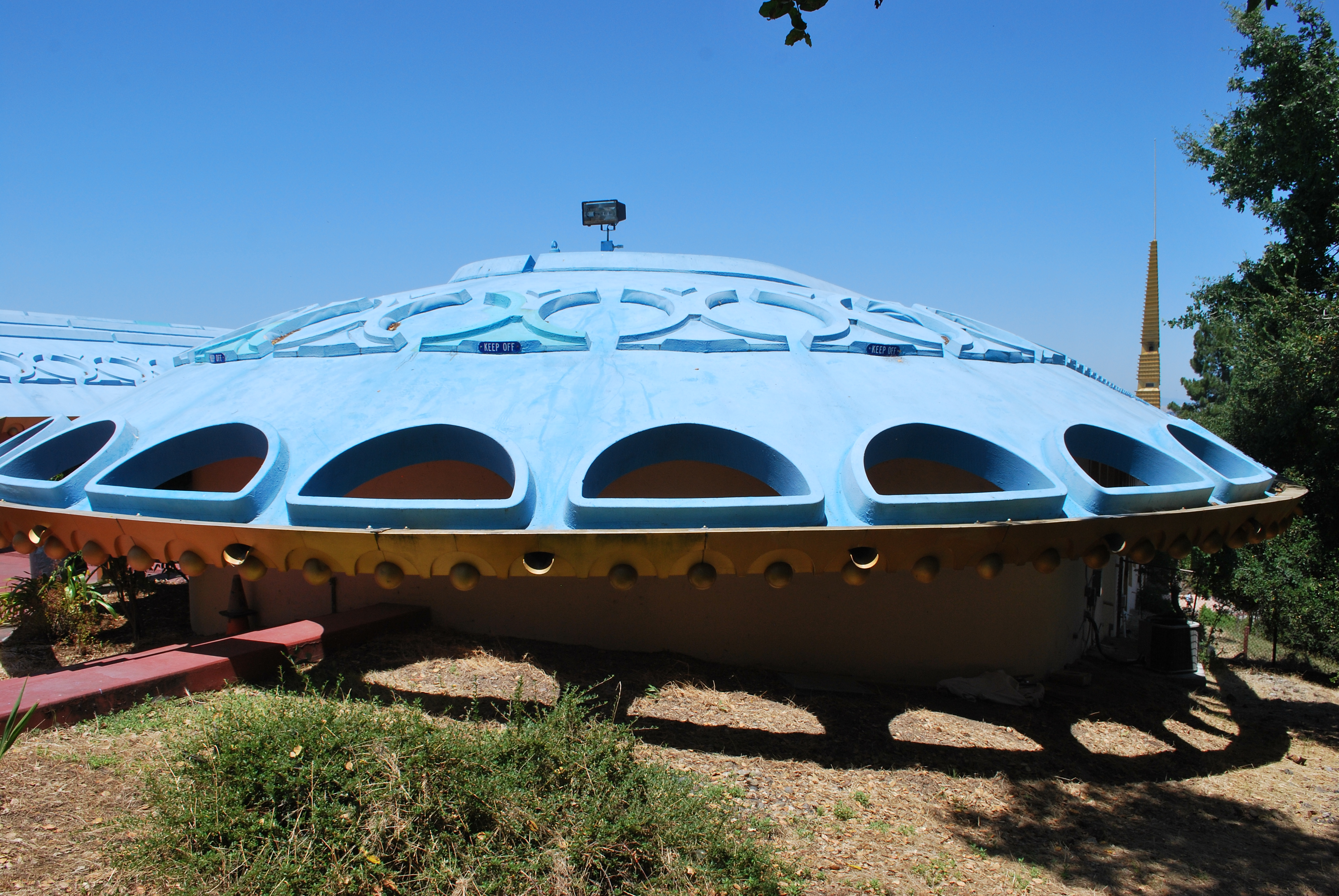
The blue roof of the main building

The new supervisors were not sworn in until January 1961. They and Fusselman voted 3–2 to halt work on January 10, 1961, furloughing 125 construction workers. Fusselman proposed converting the Civic Center into a hospital, which he said would replace a hospital that had been condemned. Local newspaper Marin Independent Journal and Marin County's courthouse received many letters protesting the vote, and protesters formed a group advocating that construction be restarted. The Journal polled readers who, by a 8,152–1,225 margin, wanted construction to continue. An independent report also advised against hospital use, and county lawyers said a cancellation could make the county government liable for $2 million in damages. (Note: Equivalent to $16.5 million in 2025) The board restarted work on January 17, and the contractor sued for time and money lost during the stoppage. Work proceeded with relatively little additional opposition. Partly as a result of the work-stoppage controversy, one of the Civic Center's opponents, Walter Blair, lost a recall election later that year to Peter H. Behr.

The Civic Center's armory opened in March 1961, being the complex's first completed structure. (Note: The post office, which was finished in 1962, is sometimes cited as the complex's first structure.) The supervisors also solicited bids for the post office. A $120,000 contract (Note: Equivalent to $0 million in 2025) for the post office was awarded that April to John McDonnell of Upper Darby Township, Pennsylvania. By that June, 80% of the Civic Center's total cost had been raised, and steel and concrete work for the first phase was 60% complete. A master plan for the Civic Center was also drawn up and presented to the board. The Administration Building's spire was being installed by December 1961. During that year, the Boy Scouts of America also sought space at the Civic Center, and county employees proposed opening a coffee shop there. By early 1962, planning was underway for the relocation of county offices to the Civic Center; the Marin Council for Civic Affairs previewed the complex on a tour that February. Green solicited bids for landscaping work, awarding contracts to two local companies that March for a combined $138,409. (Note: Equivalent to $1.1 million in 2025)

== Operational history ==
=== 1960s and 1970s: Opening and early years ===
The post office was dedicated on May 19, 1962, and the board of supervisors first met at the Administration Building in August. The Administration Building and rotunda were dedicated on October 13, 1962, with the Wright family in attendance; When the first phase opened, it spanned 160,000 square feet (15,000 m^{2}) and was to house 15 or 17 county government departments. Workers began moving in that November. Some of the larger pieces of furniture were too large for the elevators and were hoisted into the building by crane. The Marin County Free Library opened a branch in the rotunda in January 1963.

The Civic Center, particularly the Administration Building, immediately attracted a wide variety of visitors, including diplomats and daily tour buses. To accommodate international visitors, the Administration Building remained open during the weekends. At the same time, the Administration Building also experienced leaks, and its unusual topography allowed trespassers to get onto the roof. Within a year of the dedication myriad community organizations were vying for space at the Civic Center, and there were various proposals to expand the complex. By the mid-1960s, the Administration Building had 325 employees.

==== Hall of Justice and auditorium ====
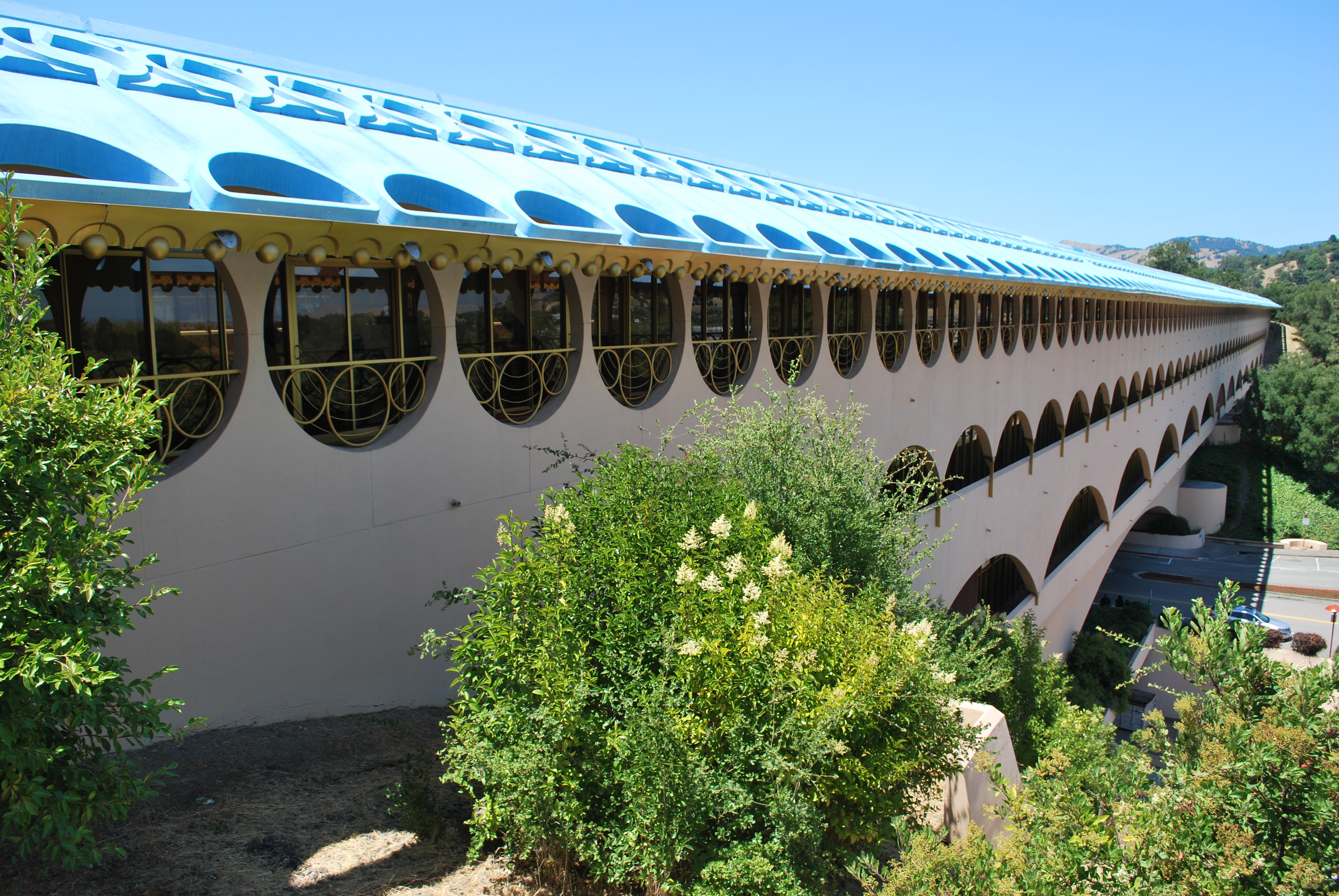
The Hall of Justice (pictured) was the second part of the main building to be constructed.

In November 1963, the supervisors approved the construction of the Hall of Justice, an annex to the main building. This annex, spanning 260,000 square feet (24,000 m^{2}), was to house law enforcement and judicial offices. The next year, the supervisors canceled plans for an outdoor amphitheater. The board directed TAA to draw up plans for the Veterans Memorial Auditorium, which would be partly funded by a veterans' fund. Designs for the auditorium were delayed because of design disagreements; veterans' groups wanted a convention facility with a flat floor, while the county wanted a space for cultural events. As a compromise, TAA designed a multipurpose convention space and auditorium. Following revisions to the complex's master plan, the board approved TAA's preliminary designs for the 3,000-seat Veterans' Memorial Auditorium in April 1965. The Marin Museum Association accepted a site at the Civic Center for a museum the next month.

Meanwhile, in early 1965, the supervisors scheduled a referendum to issue $7.75 million in bonds for the Hall of Justice. (Note: Equivalent to $60.3 million in 2025) The ad valorem tax was raising money too slowly, and the board preferred the bond issue over a tax increase or leaseback agreement. A campaign supporting the bond issue was led by the businessman Fred Enemark, a onetime Civic Center opponent who had been impressed by the Administration Building. That June, voters narrowly approved the bond issue, the first to be approved in the county in 25 years. The bonds were sold in October to a consortium led by Bank of America, and the county supplied the rest of the annex's $11.756 million cost. (Note: Equivalent to $91.5 million in 2025) The supervisors received bids for the Hall of Justice's construction in December 1965, but after rejecting all the bids as too high, they reduced the annex's budget. Robert E. McKee of Dallas, Texas, was hired two months later to construct the Hall of Justice; the contract stipulated that work be completed by October 1968.

Governor Pat Brown laid the Hall of Justice's cornerstone on May 25, 1966. During excavation of the annex, civil-rights group Congress of Racial Equality alleged that McKee was not hiring enough workers from racial minorities. By mid-1967, the Hall of Justice was 35% completed, and various other buildings and the lagoon were under development. The supervisors solicited bids that September for the Veterans' Memorial Auditorium; these bids were also too high, prompting the supervisors to reduce costs by cutting back the design to the bare minimum. In December, the supervisors opened bids for the fairgrounds and auditorium. The supervisors awarded the fairground and auditorium contract to Wright & Oretsky the next month, even though their bid of $1,894,300 was higher than two others. (Note: Equivalent to $13.4 million in 2025) Strikes, bad weather, material delivery problems, and design changes all delayed the Hall of Justice's completion. The supervisors again bought prison-made furniture for the Hall of Justice, but because the furniture costs had increased substantially, the board considered reusing furniture from the previous county courthouse.

By the end of 1968, the county's law enforcement and judicial departments were preparing to move to the Hall of Justice. The Fair/Marin group was selected to operate the fairground and auditorium that December, and the supervisors rejected a plan for an office skyscraper at the complex. The Hall of Justice was declared structurally completed in March 1969. The board of supervisors accepted control of the Hall of Justice on December 9, 1969, and the annex was dedicated on December 13. While the San Francisco Examiner wrote that $16.9 million had been spent thus far on construction, (Note: Equivalent to $113.6 million in 2025) Fusselman calculated that the complex had cost $21 million to date. (Note: Equivalent to $141.2 million in 2025) Because the Hall of Justice had been delayed 15 months, the county government earned an additional $200,000 in interest (Note: Equivalent to $1.3 million in 2025) on the $7.75 million bond issue. By early 1970, the main building had 100,000 annual visitors and was open free of charge every day. The auditorium was still under construction, and a fair pavilion, several museums, a playground, and a community center were being proposed.

==== Courthouse attacks and aftermath ====
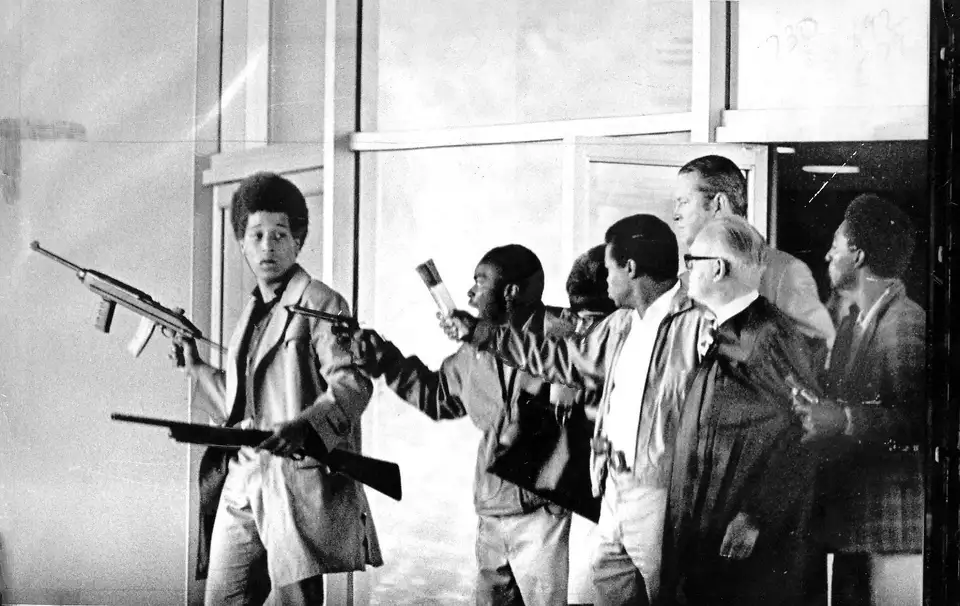
Attackers lead hostages through the building during the 1970 Civic Center attacks

On August 7, 1970, a group led by Black Panther militant Jonathan Jackson demanded the release of the "Soledad Brothers", releasing several prisoners and taking hostages in one of the courtrooms. While the group was attempting to escape, four people were killed: Jackson, presiding judge Harold Haley, and a defendant and a witness in Haley's courtroom. Black Panther activist Angela Davis fled before being caught that December and was ultimately acquitted on charges of supplying firearms to Jackson. On October 8, 1970, militant group Weather Underground detonated a bomb in endorsement of Jackson's actions, which did not cause injuries but destroyed one of the courtrooms.

The hostage incident and bombing resulted in substantial security increases, including alarm systems, new locks, and metal detectors. Security officers began searching all visitors' personal items and patrolling the interiors. Some corridors were closed off entirely, and the entire complex, including its library, was shuttered on weekends. The security measures cost another $500,000 annually, (Note: Equivalent to $2.9 million in 2025) and Green criticized the measures, saying: "We're coming to a police state." The board of supervisors retained the stringent security measures through 1971 before eliminating screenings the next year. In 1972, one of the courtrooms was set aside for contentious trials and was refitted with additional security systems, including a bulletproof shield and closed-circuit television, for about $40,000. (Note: Equivalent to $233,000 in 2025) An area near the Hall of Justice was re-landscaped as a memorial to Haley. The county dedicated the memorial in August 1973, after a competing memorial placed by anarchists was removed.

==== 1970s modifications ====
The Marin Museum Association opened a gallery in the main building in April 1970. County officials had hoped to complete the auditorium by late 1970 in celebration of Wright's 100th birthday (although he had been born in 1867). The Veterans Memorial Auditorium's official opening was delayed while the interior was fitted out. The auditorium opened on September 25, 1971, and the county fair was moved to the Civic Center that year. The complex's design and its association with Wright continued to attract visitors. Amid the 1970s energy crisis, the escalators and some elevators were shut off, and usage of electrical appliances within the complex was reduced; these measures continued throughout the decade. Droughts during that decade also prompted the county to deactivate urinals to conserve water.

Following complaints that the Veterans Memorial Auditorium could not suitably accommodate certain events, the board of supervisors authorized TAA to design a $1.2 million exhibition hall for the fairground in 1974. (Note: Equivalent to $6.1 million in 2025) When bids for the exhibition hall were solicited that September, the lowest bid from Mayta & Jensen came in at $1.9 million; (Note: Equivalent to $9.6 million in 2025) the supervisors balked at this cost, approving the contract only after the bid price was decreased. In 1976, the supervisors rebranded the fairground and related buildings as the Marin Center. The exhibition hall, which opened that October, was described by United Press International as Wright's last design. After the Marin Center operated a deficit for two consecutive years, its operators cut back on maintenance in 1979 to save money.

=== 1980s to 2000s ===
==== Seismic retrofit, funding issues, and deterioration ====
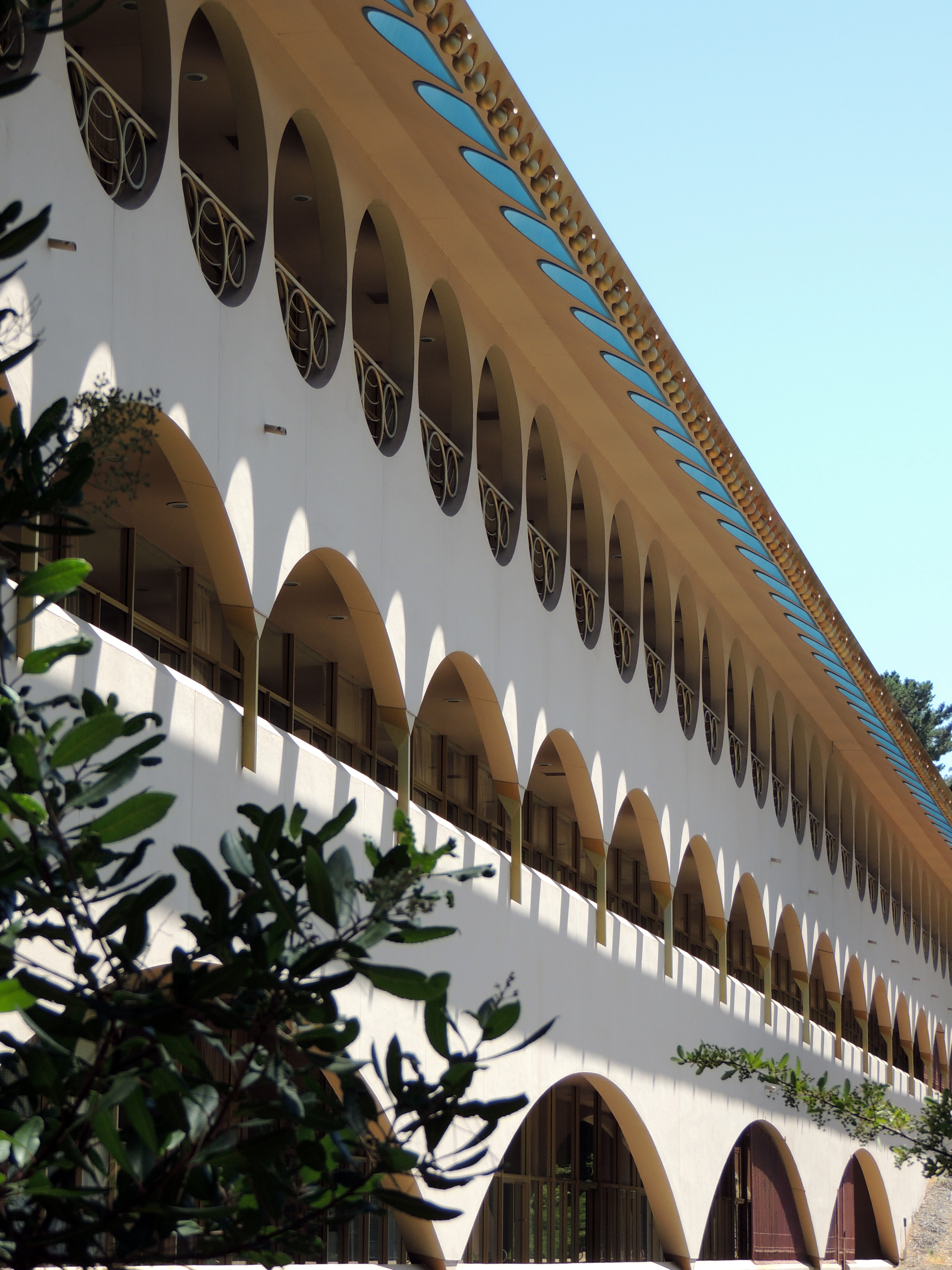
View of arches on the main building's facade

In 1981, the California State Architect's office found that the Administration Building did not meet the state's 1958 building code, given its rigid structural connections and lack of support underneath. The office's chief engineer concluded that the wing had one-fifth the required lateral strength. Other parts of the main building were not deemed susceptible to seismic damage. The supervisors authorized studies for a seismic retrofit of the Administration Building in 1984 and approved a $500,000 retrofit in 1986. (Note: Equivalent to $1.2 million in 2025)

Meanwhile, the county had proposed closing or relocating the Civic Center's library branch in 1983, but local opposition ended this plan. A weekly farmer's market was established at the Civic Center that year, expanding to twice-weekly in 1987. By the late 1980s, the main building was showing signs of deterioration, including a leaking roof and structural cracks, and estimated repair costs had increased to $4.3 million. (Note: Equivalent to $10.1 million in 2025) The Civic Center's armory was used as a homeless shelter during the winters; at the time, several Marin County cities were negotiating proposals for a permanent shelter. During summers, when the armory's shelter was closed, a homeless encampment was set up outside the Civic Center; the Marin County government legally approved the encampment in 1992.

The 1989 Loma Prieta earthquake, which occurred in the southern end of the Bay Area, did not damage the Civic Center, but it renewed supervisors' efforts to seismically reinforce the main building. To help fund repairs, the supervisors sought to have the building designated as an official landmark. The supervisors approved the repair work while it continued to seek landmark status, and the main building became a National Historic Landmark in 1991. Around that time, the Pacific Gas and Electric Company installed new nighttime illumination at the main building after learning the supervisors had stopped illuminating it at night due to budget cuts.

==== New jail ====
Also during the 1980s and 1990s, there were plans to replace the county jail, which was so overcrowded that hundreds of defendants who had already been sentenced could not be sent to jail. A court order in 1985 compelled the supervisors to reduce overcrowding. The supervisors ordered studies for the new jail that next year, after $7 million (Note: Equivalent to $17.4 million in 2025) for that purpose was approved by California Proposition 52. To qualify for this funding, the jail had to be under construction by September 1990, though this deadline was postponed two years. Work was delayed due to disputes over the jail's capacity and structure. Local residents opposed an above-ground jail next to the Civic Center, and they also mobilized against an alternative proposal for an underground jail because of the proposed $7.5 million (Note: Equivalent to $17.6 million in 2025) cost of excavations. Voters rejected a 1987 bond referendum and a 1988 sales tax increase, both of which would have funded the jail.

After the sales tax measure failed, the underground jail proposal was set aside in favor of an above-ground facility, which did not require bond funding as the underground plan had. Opposition arose over its location near Wright's building. Peters and Green claimed an above-ground jail would clash with Wright's design, and preservationists also said the plan would jeopardize the main building's landmark designation. In response, in 1990, the board of supervisors agreed to reconsider an underground jail. The board considered proposals for partially-underground or hillside jails, and in August they approved Green's design for a hillside jail. Further delays arose from a state court's order that a detailed environmental report be prepared; the report, published in October 1991, received substantial public criticism.

Jail opponents proposed Measure A, a referendum requiring voter approval for any new major construction at the Civic Center, which passed overwhelmingly in November 1992. A state judge ruled later the same month that Measure A did not apply to the jail, which at that point was already under construction. Measure A still applied to all new buildings exceeding 250 square feet (23 m^{2}). By then, the existing jail was being used mainly for pre-trial and pre-sentencing detention, while another facility called the Honor Farm accommodated convicts; the new jail would allow both facilities to be closed. The new jail cost about $20 million, (Note: Equivalent to $39.3 million in 2025) and opened in late 1994. The Novato Advance wrote at the time that the jail's construction had been budgeted at $30 million, (Note: Equivalent to $59.0 million in 2025) 50% above the final cost.

==== Late 1990s and 2000s ====
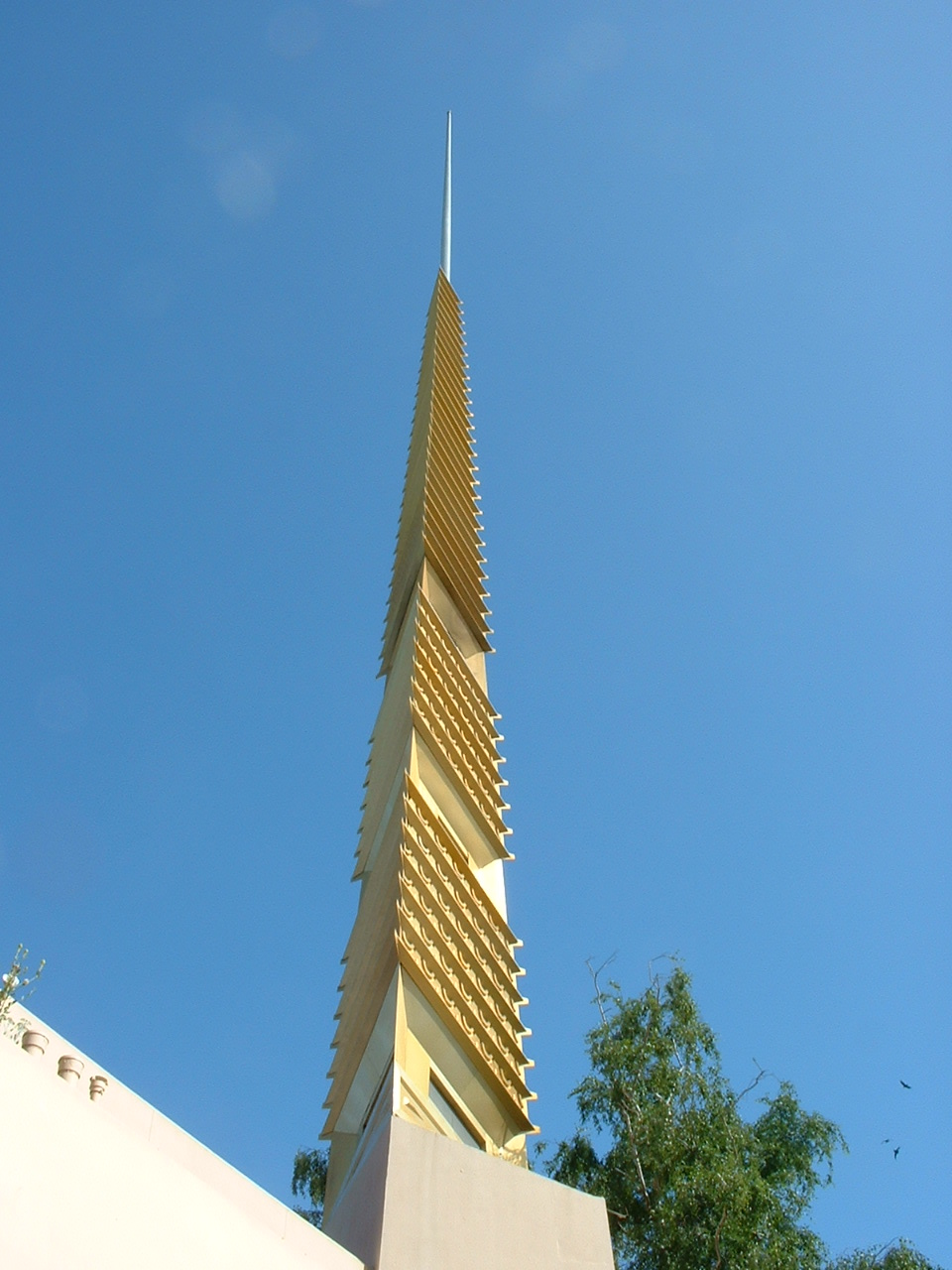
The spire atop the Civic Center's rotunda

By the mid-1990s, the main building had a leaky roof, cracked columns, shrinking floor tiles, and broken fountains. Due to reductions in maintenance budgets, the grounds could not be mowed or irrigated, and the windows went unwashed. Workers put buckets on the floor to catch leaks. Some of these issues were remediated in 1996 during filming for the thriller Gattaca, when film crews cleaned up parts of the building; their rent payments also helped alleviate deficits in the maintenance budget. The roof went unrepaired while funds were diverted to bring the building into compliance with the Americans with Disabilities Act of 1990. The California government finally agreed to fund roof repairs in 1998. That year, the supervisors spent $1.3 million (Note: Equivalent to $2.4 million in 2025) converting parts of the Hall of Justice's original jail and dining facilities into offices. This allowed other offices to be closed temporarily while the building underwent seismic retrofits.

The county proposed closing the Civic Center's library in 1999 to cover a $1.4 million deficit. (Note: Equivalent to $2.5 million in 2025) After enthusiasts of Wright's work and local residents protested the closure, the library was kept open. By the next year, the contractors were repainting the roof and repairing skylights as part of a $1.3 million renovation. The complex continued to attract tourists into the 21st century. In the late 2000s, there were proposals to complete Wright's master plan, some parts of which had never been completed.

=== 2010s to present ===
In 2012, in conjunction with the construction of SMART's Marin Civic Center station, the county announced plans for landscape and traffic upgrades at the Civic Center's northwestern corner. The county and the Agricultural Institute of Marin (AIM), which operated the Civic Center's farmers' market also proposed bathrooms and permanent pavement for the farmers' market. At the time, the farmers' market had no utilities or permanent facilities. In 2013, the vehicular forecourt in front of the Veterans' Memorial Auditorium was renovated, and the complex received a new fire alarm system. The next year, the Civic Center's library branch was renovated for $300,000, and the supervisors approved a $5 million proposal for street and landscape improvements at the Civic Center's northern end.

Meanwhile, the farmers' market building had to be approved by referendum. In 2014, voters approved Measure B, allowing AIM to pave a parking lot and construct a building. The ballot measure received little opposition, and the Frank Lloyd Wright Building Conservancy offered to help oversee the market building's development. The market received a $93,000 federal grant that year. An environmental study for the market and the landscape and traffic improvements was approved in 2015, but development of the market was delayed for a decade. That year, the supervisors decided to begin replacing the main building's roof for $17.8 million. By that decade, the main building employed 1,000 people, and its roof had already undergone three major repairs. The Marin Center fairgrounds were also in disrepair, and the roofs at the Exhibit Hall and the Veterans' Auditorium were leaking. The supervisors approved a contract to replace the main building's roof in 2017; the roof was retrofitted in 2020 with a new membrane that had to be repainted every five years.

The Veterans' Auditorium was closed in 2023 for seismic and building code upgrades, which were originally supposed to last a year. The seismic retrofit, completed in March 2024, included strengthening the stage walls and ceilings and installing bracing. The auditorium's reopening was postponed repeatedly after additional issues were discovered, including structural settlement and damaged utility lines and equipment. The cost of the auditorium's renovation had increased to $18.9 million by 2025. That year, the Marin County Board of Supervisors agreed to lease 3.7 acres (1.5 ha) at the Civic Center to the AIM for 40 years. As part of the lease, the first phase of the farmer's market, consisting of a permanent pavement, was to be completed by 2027 and cost $13.4 million. A second phase, to be completed later, would include three buildings. The supervisors provided a $2.5 million matching grant to for the farmer's market's first phase in mid-2026, and the AIM received another $13.25 million from California Assembly Bill 113 that October. As of 2026, the auditorium was planned to reopen in 2027.

== Architecture ==
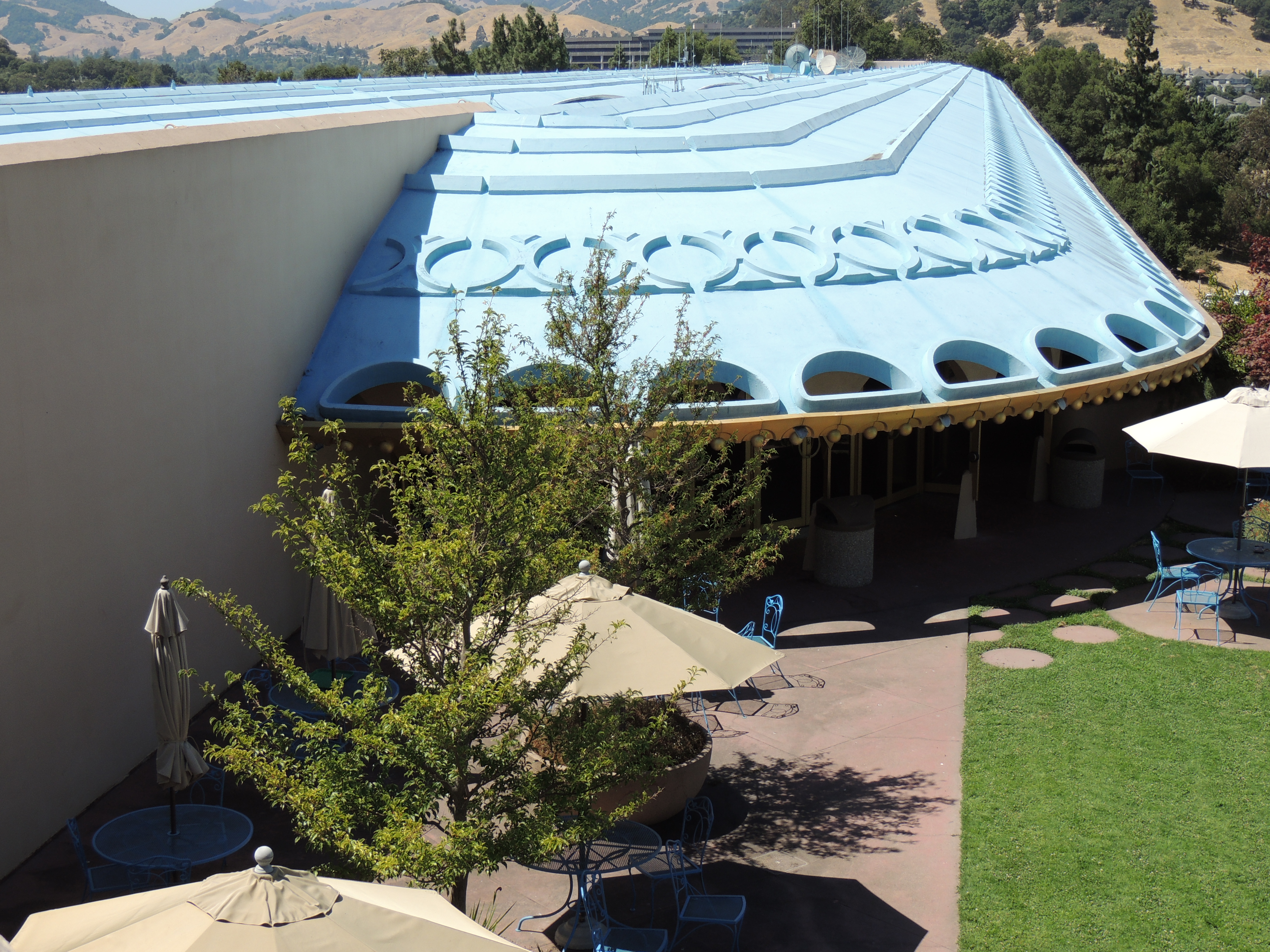
A terrace outside the main building

The Civic Center consists of several structures, including a main building (consisting of the Administration Building and Hall of Justice), along with a post office, military armory, veterans' building, and convention building. The Civic Center was Frank Lloyd Wright's largest public project and has been cited as his only completed governmental project. Along with the Solomon R. Guggenheim Museum in New York, the Civic Center was among Wright's final commissions; it has been cited as his last major work. Some of the Civic Center's buildings (including parts of the main building) are credited posthumously to Wright.

The design borrowed ideas and forms from Wright's Broadacre City concept, first published in 1932. Its integration with the topography followed Wright's belief that hillside and hilltop buildings should be "of" the hill, rather than "on" it. Wright said he wanted the Civic Center to be "fresh, convenient and beautiful", and that it should "melt into the sun-burnt hills". Wright also wanted the complex to be a "good time place", a major factor in the discontent over the jail during the 1980s and 1990s. When the first phase opened, Olgivanna said that "men should not be expected to work in dismal surroundings".

The Civic Center hosts public tours on Wednesdays, and its main building also hosts artwork through an agreement with the Marin Arts Council. The complex, particularly the main building, also hosts weddings. Since 1997, the Frank Lloyd Wright Civic Center Conservancy has been responsible for raising funds and reviewing proposed changes to the complex. The conservancy was formed through a merger of the Civic Center Conservancy, created by preservationists in 1990 to review proposed modifications, and the Civic Center Preservation Fund, created by the supervisors in 1996 to oversee fundraising.

=== Main building ===
The main building, spanning two valleys, consists of the 580-foot-long (180 m) Administration Building and the 880-foot-long (270 m) Hall of Justice. (Note: Different lengths have been cited for both buildings.: Hall of Justice: 858 feet (262 m), 900 feet (270 m).; Administration Building: 530 feet (160 m), 584 feet (178 m), 600 feet (180 m).) The Administration Building is to the south, and the Hall of Justice is to the north. Both wings function as bridges above their respective valleys; there is one road under the Administration Building and two roads under the Hall of Justice. The ends of both wings are raised above the hillside. The wings intersect at a 120° angle, connected by a 80-foot (24 m) diameter rotunda, The rotunda is largely imperceptible from outside because of the building's extreme length. A terrace and fountain are situated outside the rotunda where the two wings intersect. The building spans about 470,000 square feet (44,000 m^{2}).

The Hall of Justice was inspired by a courthouse in Eugene, Oregon. The rotunda was inspired by Wright's earlier Child of the Sun at Florida Southern College, and the rotunda's dome and spire are attributed as having Persian and Islamic architectural influences. Wright's use of domes and arches is a commonality shared with his never-built Plan for Greater Baghdad. The overall design is characteristic of Wright's later designs, which tended toward organic architecture. The scholars Nicoletta Sala and Gabriele Cappellato said the building's design had intentionally used fractals, similar to what Wright had done at the William Palmer House in Ann Arbor, Michigan.

==== Exterior ====
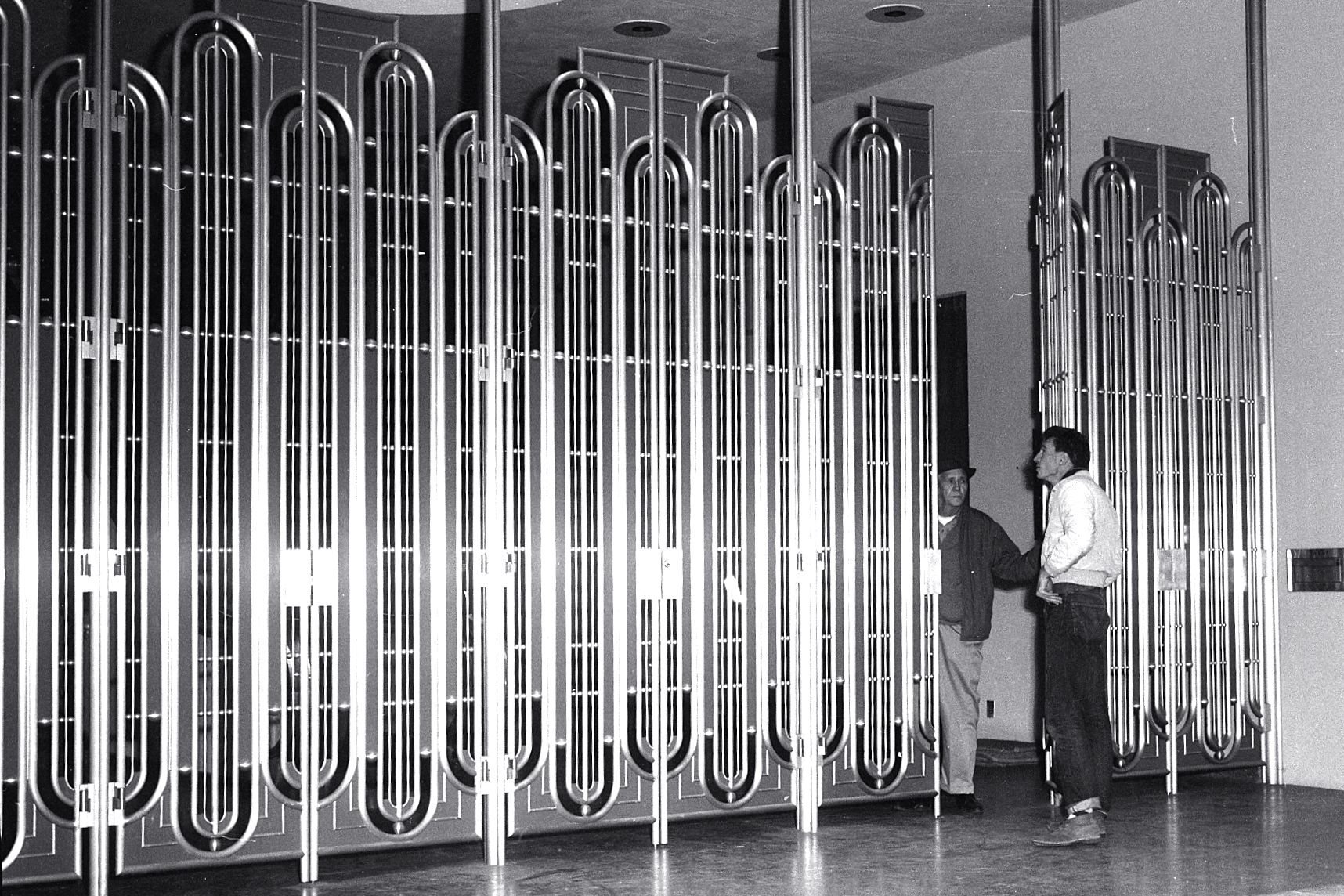
Entrances (seen in 1963) are controlled by vertical grilles of gold-anodized metal.

The entire structure is made of precast concrete. The Administration Building and Hall of Justice are entered through archways on their lower levels. Wright referred to the street-level entrances as "pendant crescents". The entrances are through vertical grilles of gold-anodized metal with rounded tops and bottoms, which are designed in the Art Deco style. The rotunda has its own entrance, leading to a library inside.

The walls are tinted in a sandy or golden tan hue to blend with the landscape. The longer elevations of the facade are marked by shallow arches, which decrease in depth on the upper stories, akin to a Roman aqueduct. The arches are framed with steel and are non-load-bearing, being cantilevered from the floor slabs. The windows on the upper stories are recessed from the arches, creating balconies. The exterior design was likened to the arches in old Spanish missions. The space formerly occupied by the complex's original jail, on the Hall of Justice's top story, is recessed from the facade to avoid the need for prison bars. Instead, the windows adjoining the original jail are made of opaque frosted glass. At the Hall of Justice's northern end, a prison yard was excavated into the hillside next to the prison.

The roof consists of a barrel arch, except above the rotunda, where it is domed. It is made of reinforced concrete and is supported by concrete trusses. The roof is covered with a blue waterproof membrane. Wright's concept envisioned a gold-colored roof, but this color was difficult to obtain in a long-lasting material. After Wright's death, his widow Olgivanna Lloyd Wright chose a bright blue color that would weather well. This color, together with the pink stucco walls, gave the building the nickname "Big Pink". To conceal defects, the fascias at the roof's edges are patterned with precast ornament, such as gold aluminum panels and arch-and-ball motifs.

The only large gold-colored element is a spire above the rotunda, a feature Wright had previously proposed for the Annunciation Greek Orthodox Church in Wauwatosa, Wisconsin. The spire is made of gold-anodized aluminum, a material also used at the Annunciation Church and the Gammage Memorial Auditorium in Tempe, Arizona, which Wright designed nearly simultaneously. The 172-foot (52 m) spire was meant to house a radio transmitter and the boiler plant's chimney. The transmitter was never built, but the spire has empty conduits that could be retrofitted with communications wiring in the future. The spire's inclusion was consistent with Wright's belief that the Civic Center be a source of knowledge and entertainment.

==== Interior ====
Interior of one of the Civic Center's atrium "malls"

The floor slabs are made of precast and prestressed concrete manufactured by the Ben C. Gerwick Company. The slabs, in turn, are supported by elliptical steel columns with precast concrete cladding. To accommodate the open plan office spaces, the interior has relatively few columns. The main building was built with expansion joints throughout, which extend down into the foundations. When built, the structure needed 500 tons of cooling every year, and the two boilers were each capable of 6,000,000 British thermal units (6,300,000 kJ).

===== Circulation features =====
The hilly topography of the site permitted entrances to the main building at all four levels. The Administration Building's main entrance on Behr Drive leads to a lobby at level C with terrazzo floors. Next to this lobby are escalators; these lead to the first floor directly above, where elevators span the Administration Building's height. There are also stairs ascending the building's height. The Hall of Justice lacks escalators but has seven elevators, five public stairs, and one prison stairway. The Hall of Justice has three lobbies, permitting separate pedestrian and vehicular entrances for the jail on the top story.

The main building's wings pass over the vehicular entrances.

The interiors have few high-end finishes, other than aluminum anodized with gold. The offices are arranged around atria, which Wright referred to as "malls", though unlike the atria at Wright's earlier Larkin Administration Building or Johnson Administration Building, the Civic Center's malls were not intended as meeting spaces. The malls have plantings at the bottom of multi-story lightwells. The lightwells are progressively wider on higher stories, similar to at the Guggenheim Museum, and allow occupants to talk to each other across the central open spaces. For air circulation, the spaces above the lightwells were originally open-air. Peters later designed skylights above the lightwells, which are made of plexiglass and have expansion joints. The lightwells are surrounded by curved interior balconies at each level. Elsewhere in the building, public corridors have walls with marble wainscoting. The corridors and atria in both sections of the building are nearly identical.

===== Offices =====
The office spaces have open plans with movable partitions. The offices use acoustic ceilings, along with red composition tiles painted in Wright's favorite color. For the Administration Building, the county ordered custom-built furniture from the San Quentin Rehabilitation Center; the prison supplied furniture for the Hall of Justice as well. Wright's master plan grouped departments with similar functions in the same general area, except for judicial and police functions, which were isolated from other departments. The interiors also have glass walls, allowing natural light to enter from either the exterior or the atrium; this permitted natural light into all rooms. The glass walls were in keeping with Wright's philosophy of maximum openness of government activities. The floor layouts in both sections of the main building differ slightly. The Hall of Justice's corridors are flanked by offices of equal width, while the Administration Building's east-facing offices are narrower than its west-facing offices.

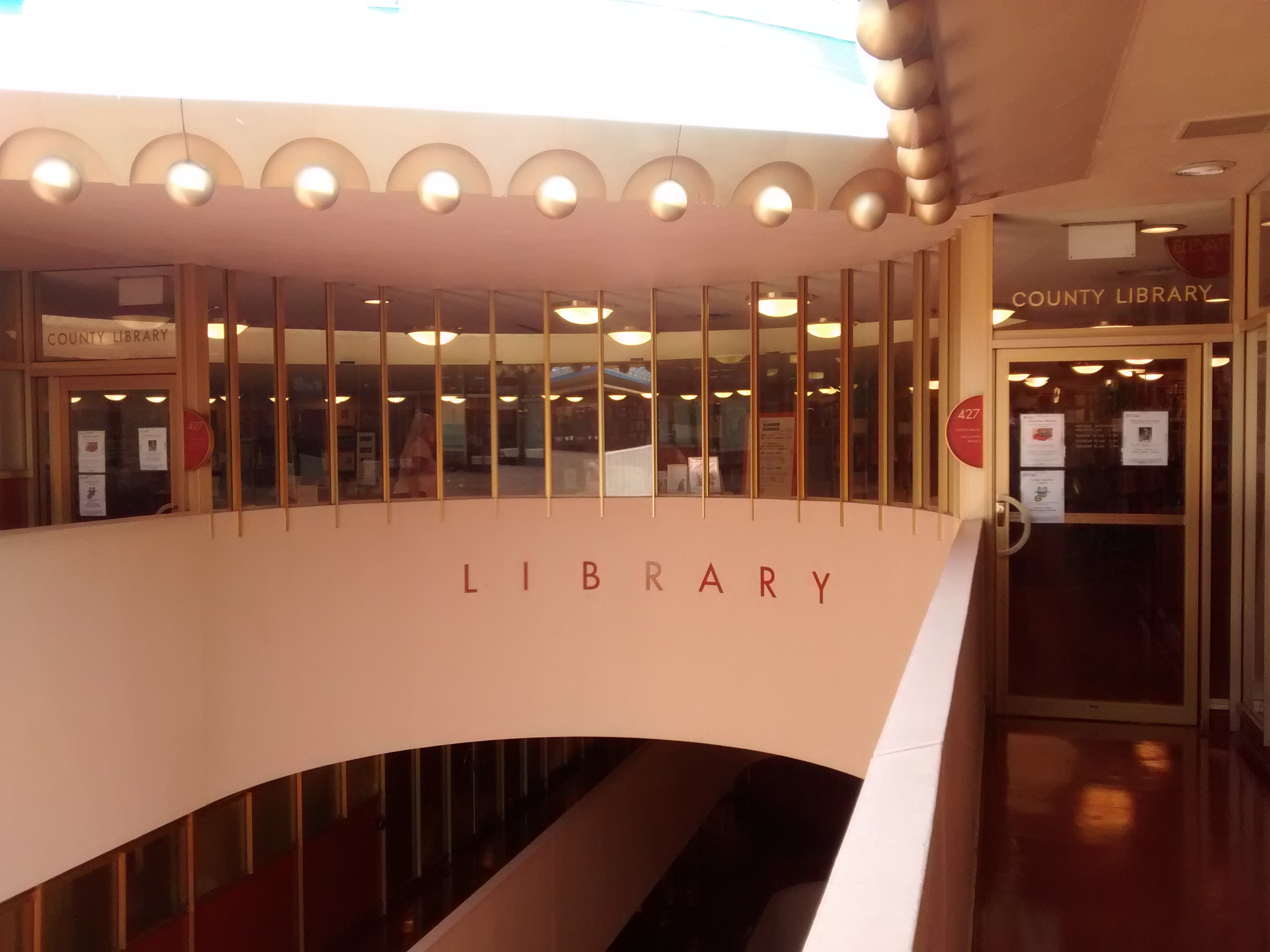
The Marin County Free Library has a branch on the third story of the rotunda.

At the Administration Building's lobby level (one level below the first story) is an information office, along with storage and mechanical functions. The rest of the Administration Building has meeting rooms for the board of supervisors, along with most county offices other than police, judicial, health, and county recorder's offices. The rotunda houses a branch of the Marin County Free Library on the third story, along with a cafeteria on the second story and the Board of Supervisors' quarters. The library, spanning 20,000 square feet (1,900 m^{2}), consists of book stacks arranged concentrically around a central reading room, which in turn is indirectly lit by natural light outside. It has a bright-white dome with a gold-colored rim containing light fixtures, similar to the rotunda of Istanbul's Hagia Sophia.

The Hall of Justice has a partial lobby level with three stories above it; due to the topography, its top level corresponds to the Administration Building's second floor. The Hall of Justice's lobby level, two levels below the first story, has two lobbies for pedestrians and a separate lobby for the original jail. The courtrooms are on level C, immediately above the lobby level, and originally consisted of 10 courtrooms with space for 6 more. Each courtroom has a circular layout, with curved seats surrounding lecterns, curved counsel's tables, and evidence racks lining the curved walls. The courtrooms also have walnut paneling, red carpets, and blue chairs, but they lack windows to reduce distractions. The Press Democrat wrote that the curved courtrooms, along with the plantings and warm color palette, put litigants at ease. The first floor (above level C) had county offices, and the second (top) floor has a cafeteria and originally contained the jail. Wright reluctantly added the jail to the plan after initially arguing that a jail would be incompatible with the rest of the design. As built, the jail could accommodate 118 or 125 prisoners; the cells were designed like others of the time, with bare metal furnishings. Rather than putting the jail in the basement, as was often the case, Wright put the jail on the top floor so prisoners could view nature.

=== Post office ===
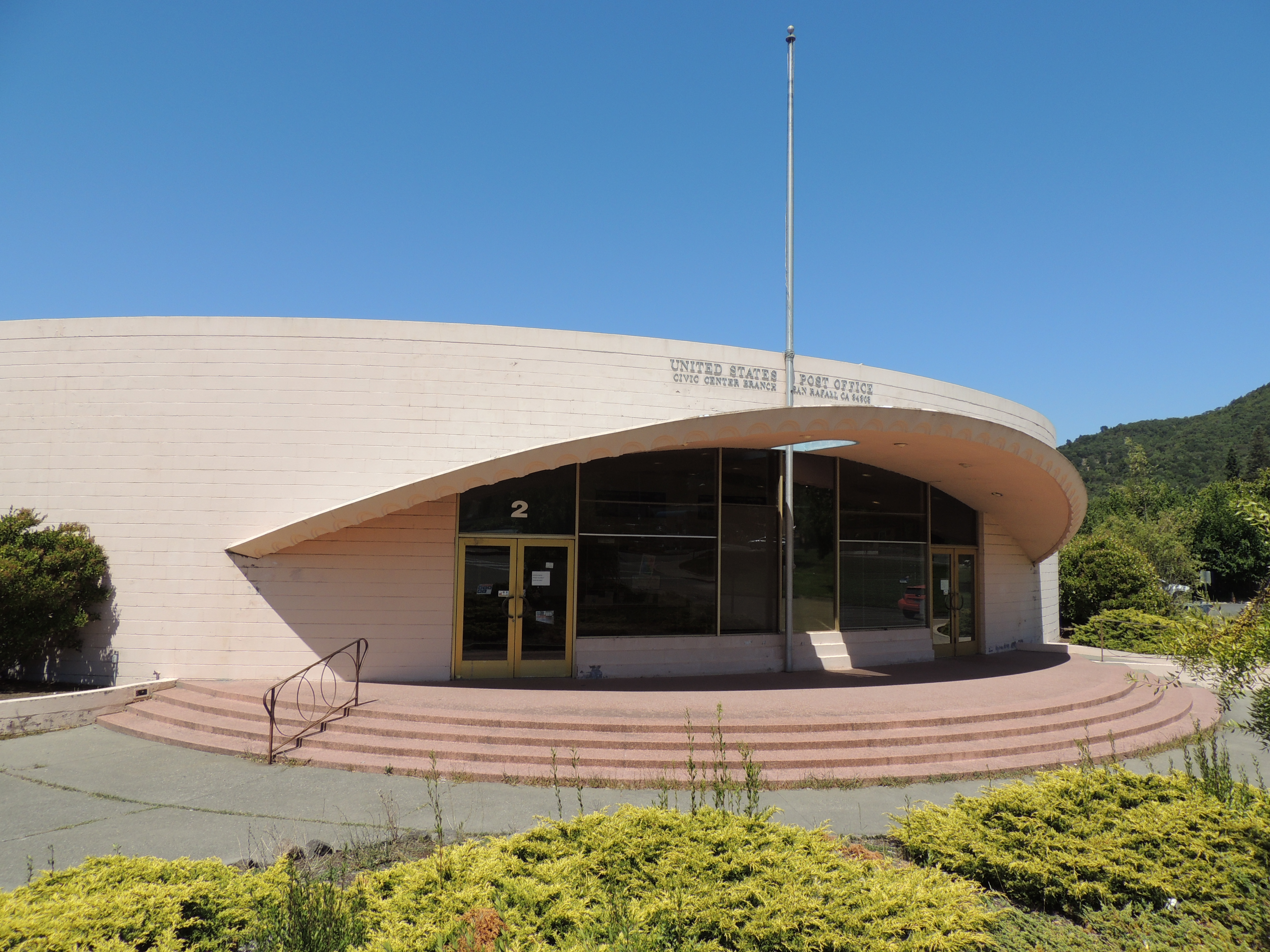
The post office

The Civic Center's post office, occupying a 4,088-square-foot (379.8 m^{2}) site, is located east of the Administration Building, directly across Civic Center Drive. It was also designed by Wright. The Marin County supervisors had mandated that the design harmonize with the overall master plan, and they refused to accept any architect other than Wright. The post office was the only U.S. federal government building Wright ever designed.

The post office, a single-story structure with an elliptical floor plan, is made of concrete masonry units and has a flat roof. The front elevation has a glass wall with metal mullions dividing it into five sections, while the rear elevation has a loading dock recessed between a pair of round windows. Protruding above the facade is a cantilevered canopy with circular embellishments. Outside the entrance originally was a plastic globe, which was later removed. Inside are 4,000 square feet (370 m^{2}) of offices and another 19,000 square feet (1,800 m^{2}) dedicated to visitor circulation and deliveries. The interior has an elliptical lobby to the south and mailroom to the north. The lobby and mailroom are separated by counters and mailboxes, which are themselves arranged on a curve.

=== Auditorium ===
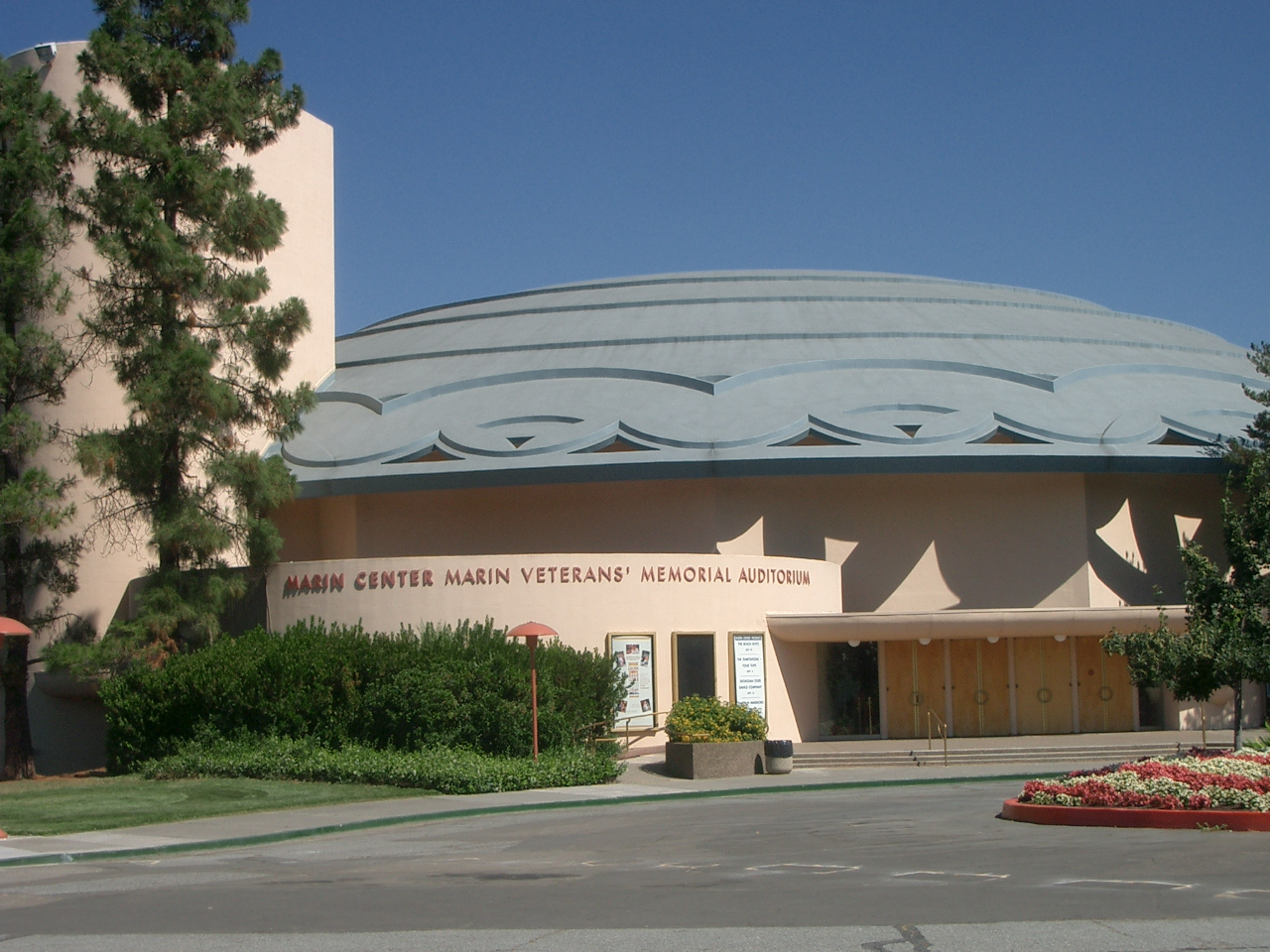
Veterans Memorial Auditorium

The Veterans' Memorial Auditorium is on the fairground north of the Hall of Justice, across Civic Center Drive and the lagoon. It was designed by TAA and was completed in 1971 in a manner compatible with the main building. Peters was the main designer responsible for the auditorium. The auditorium was designed for use by the county fair with a combination of flat-floor exhibition space and tiered seating spaces, a compromise devised by William Wesley Peters, George Izenour, and Aaron Green. It has a domed roof and an interior blue-and-sandy color scheme devised by Olgivanna Lloyd Wright.

The main hall seats about 2,000 (Note: Other sources give a different capacity of 1,960 or 2,200 seats.) when arranged in an amphitheatrical layout. It can also be used as a small 800-seat theater, since 1,200 of the seats can be folded down when not in use. The auditorium also has an 80-foot-wide (24 m) movable wall that could be slid into place to improve acoustics when the auditorium was being used as a theater. The main hall's stage has a movable platform that can be used to move props. Adjoining the main hall are two side lobbies and a rear entrance foyer. A separate Showcase Theater in the same building has a capacity of about 300 seats.

=== Other structures ===
Among the Civic Center's other buildings is a military building used by the National Guard and the Naval Reserve. The military building, located at the site's eastern corner near Madison and Roosevelt avenues, consists of a 60-by-120-foot (18 by 37 m) drill hall and a 20-foot-wide (6.1 m) lean-to. The building includes a supply room, weapons storage, classroom, and shower and locker facilities.

The fairground's convention or exhibition hall, also designed by TAA, dates from 1976. As originally planned it included a 24,500-square-foot (2,280 m^{2}) exhibition space; a 4,000-square-foot (370 m^{2}) meeting hall that could be subdivided into nine smaller meeting rooms; and a larger meeting room spanning 2,900 square feet (270 m^{2}). The final design included the exhibition space and seven meeting rooms. The exhibition hall can seat 2,000 people in a theater configuration. It can also be configured as a 1,000-seat dining room and can accommodate 5,000 people in a standing-room-only configuration.

A three-story hexagonal jail was completed in 1994 on a hill adjoining the Hall of Justice's northern end. It was primarily designed by Daniel Mann Johnson Mendenhall. The design concept was originally suggested by Aaron Green, who was the consulting architect for the project. The jail, spanning 115,000 square feet (10,700 m^{2}), is placed within an excavated portion of the hillside that measures up to 46 feet (14 m) deep. The jail is not completely underground, and trees and earth are placed around and in front of the jail to partly conceal it. Inside are 222 cells, which contain a combined 362 beds. There are 70 beds reserved for women, disabled people, and inmates with special needs, and 192 beds reserved for men. The jail connects to the Hall of Justice via a tunnel.

==== Unbuilt structures ====
The original plans also called for a 3,000-seat amphitheater and a fairground pavilion. The amphitheater had been replaced by the Veterans Memorial Auditorium in the final plan. The pavilion was never built due to concerns that the design was poorly suited for the climate; the tract reserved for the pavilion, at the complex's northwest corner, was instead developed as a garage. The pavilion had been planned as contained a tensile roof with a textile covering stretched between pylons. There had also been proposals for a senior center and a heliport at the Civic Center, but these, along with other plans such as a children's zoo and restaurant, were never built.

== Impact and legacy ==
=== Reception ===
==== Contemporary ====
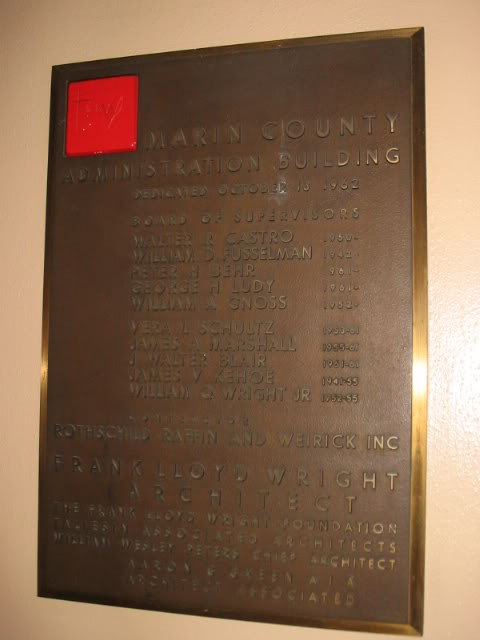
The red tile features Frank Lloyd Wright's signature.

When the plans were revealed in April 1958, commentary was mixed. After the first phase opened, the San Francisco Chronicle and The New York Times wrote that the design successfully enhanced the landscape, and the Chronicle proclaimed that "something of a miracle has been wrought in the Marin hills". San Francisco Examiner architecture critic Alexander Fried wrote that Wright's ideal of organic architecture "is beautifully fulfilled" and that the blue roof contrasted with the landscape. The Los Angeles Times wrote that the spire and dome were akin to those found in a world's fair and a state capitol, respectively, while the main building itself resembled a bridge. The Atlanta Journal wrote that the main building's design was variously called "another Taj Mahal, a glorified Hollywood diner and a taxpayers' nightmare". Public perception ranged from rage to awe. In 1963, a year after the first phase opened, the Independent Journal wrote that the complex was "the object of insults now and again from scattered mavericks" but attracted widespread attention nonetheless.

When the Hall of Justice was completed in 1969, the Independent Journal said that Wright's design was integrated "beautifully" into the landscape but that its extreme length, nearly 1/4 mile (0.40 km), failed to account for the staff's practical needs. The Examiner wrote that, though the complex was almost uniformly held in high regard among architectural commentators, the public still lambasted the design or regarded it as too costly and lavish for a government building. The Sacramento Bee likened the Hall of Justice to "Versailles of Schonbrunn in its dimensions". When the jail was being built, The Press Democrat wrote that Wright had "raised this unfocused architecture into the realm of civic art" in creating the main building, and that the jail did not conform with the original design.

Employees generally liked the design, which contrasted with the dingy and dim spaces they had previously occupied. Although the Redwood City Tribune called the Civic Center "an almost heavenly environment in which to put your eight hours", employees initially complained of minor issues such as temperature and found the complex hard to access. The Hartford Courant wrote in 1970 that "the most frequent complaint of Center employees is they have a lot of walking in the 1,400-foot-long [430 m] building".

==== Retrospective ====
The Christian Science Monitor wrote in 1976 that the complex had a "space-age look" because of the circular design motifs used throughout. The Examiner wrote in 1982 that "the county got a monument to the architect, all right". The next year, Newsweek wrote that, though Wright's other non-residential designs in the 1950s had attracted mixed commentary, the Civic Center was well-liked. The Washington Post wrote in 1987 that the Civic Center was among several of "Wright's finest buildings [...] in regular public use". In 1990, the American Institute of Architects' (AIA) California Council designated the Civic Center's main building as a building of enduring significance. Paul Goldberger wrote the next year that the Civic Center was Wright's "crowning achievement on the West Coast", just as the Guggenheim Museum had been a similar accomplishment on the East Coast. Conversely, one tour guide said in 1996 that commentators saw the decorations as too garish and more appropriate for Disneyland.

In 2000, Herbert Muschamp wrote that the Civic Center, along with the Salk Institute for Biological Studies and the Islip, New York, federal courthouse, exemplified the tradition of "suburbia as a context for modern monuments". A Chicago Tribune writer said in 2006 that the design exemplified how Wright's organic architecture fit the California landscape. Upon the 50th anniversary of the Civic Center's approval, a writer for the Chronicle said in 2009 that the Civic Center had been Wright's "forward-looking finale" and that the spire, domes, arches, and bridges in the main building's design contrasted with the rectangular Prairie School houses that typified Wright's early work. In 2014, the writer Mark Anthony Wilson regarded the complex as a gift "to the people of Marin and the world", praising its integration into the landscape. The Guardian wrote on Wright's 150th birthday in 2017 that the main building was "a fusion of a UFO and a Roman aqueduct", and The New York Times similarly called the main building an "otherworldly spectacle" and likened the auditorium to a spaceship in 2022.

Commentators wrote that the pink, gold, and blue color scheme distinguished it from other designs, as did its balconies and roof. The building was also sometimes compared to a skyscraper turned on its side. Several commentators regarded the Civic Center as being of inferior quality to Wright's other work. Robert Campbell of The Boston Globe wrote in 1983 that the Civic Center and Guggenheim Museum "do not represent Wright at his very best". Wright biographer Brendan Gill called the Civic Center "a single, radically overextended beached whale of a structure" that violated several Wrightian design principles. Another biographer, Robert McCarter, similarly called the Civic Center "perhaps Wright's most disappointing design", as the design details did not effectively convey Wright's original design intentions.

=== Landmark designations ===
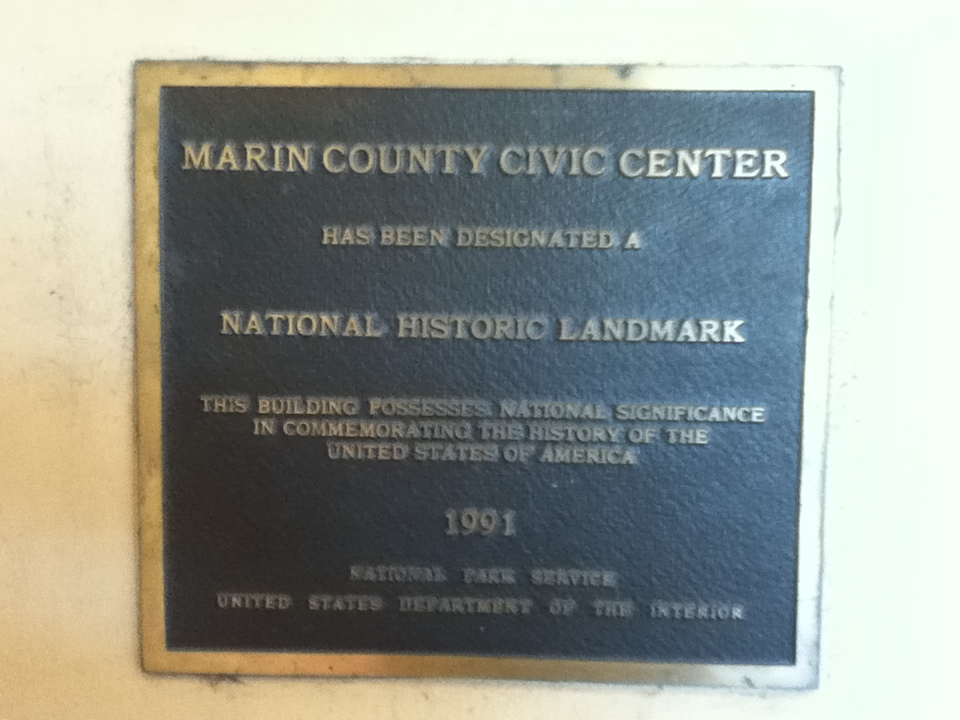
National Historic Landmark plaque

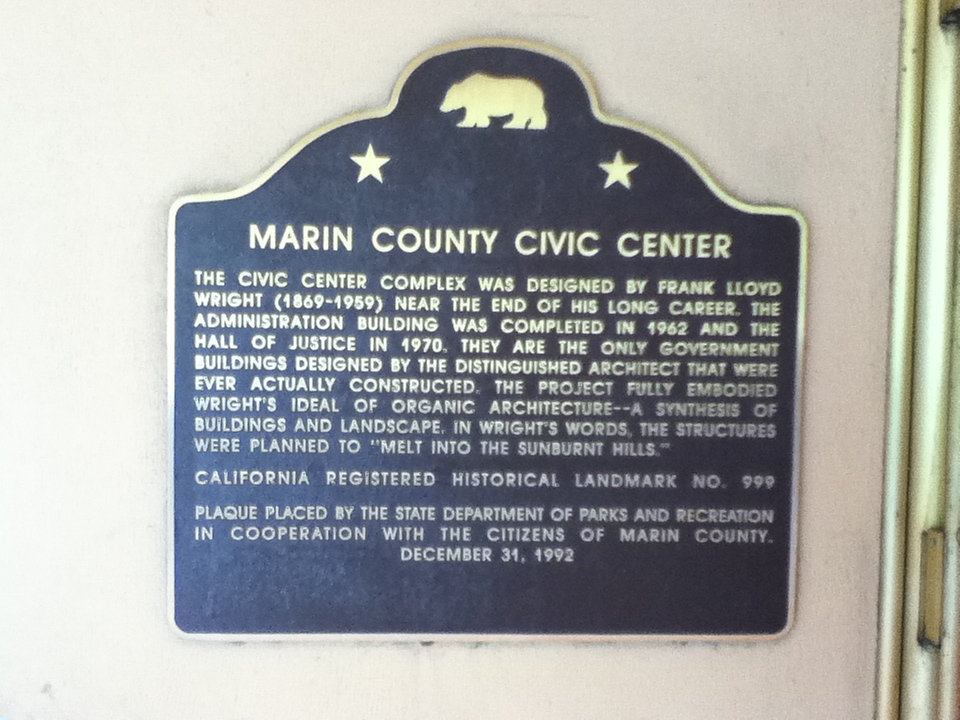
California Historical Landmark plaque

The Marin County government began seeking landmark designation for the Civic Center's main building in the late 1980s, both to receive federal funding for repairs and because of the building's architectural merits. Following a recommendation by the National Park Service Advisory Board, the Civic Center's main building was added to the National Register of Historic Places (NRHP) as a National Historic Landmark on July 17, 1991. Unlike other NRHP listings, which are typically at least 50 years old at the time of designation, the oldest Civic Center facilities were only 30 years old at the time. Only 81.5 acres (33.0 ha) of the complex, comprising the main building, post office, and lagoon, are contributing properties to the NHL designation. The NRHP listing subjects any modifications to federal preservation standards.

The Civic Center was also designated as a California Historical Landmark in 1991 as landmark number #999. Architectural Record magazine described the Civic Center in 2000 as one of the United States' "most famous [architectural] works of the mid-20th century" that were protected as local or national landmarks.

The Marin County Civic Center and other Wright-designed buildings were nominated as a UNESCO World Heritage Site in 2015, but UNESCO did not approve the nomination, referring the nomination back to the Frank Lloyd Wright Building Conservancy for revision. Eight of Wright's buildings were re-nominated to the World Heritage List in December 2018; the Civic Center and the Price Tower in Oklahoma were excluded from the proposal. UNESCO ultimately designated these properties in July 2019 under the title "The 20th-Century Architecture of Frank Lloyd Wright".

=== Media ===
When the Civic Center was under construction, a model of it was commissioned in August 1958 and shown at the California State Fair that September. The model was also displayed at New York's Metropolitan Museum of Art in 1959 before being shown at the Milan Triennial. The model was moved to the Civic Center when it was completed. The complex was also depicted in the 1984 documentary The Architecture of Frank Lloyd Wright, as well as a traveling exhibition sponsored by the Frank Lloyd Wright Foundation in the late 1980s. In addition, the main building's design is part of a countywide educational program launched in 2018.

Images of the complex were published widely and were depicted in futuristic and science-fiction films. The Marin County Civic Center was a filming location for director George Lucas's film THX 1138 (1971). Lucas later used elements of the Civic Center's design as inspiration for structures on Naboo in the Star Wars prequel trilogy. Also within the Star Wars franchise, the building inspired concept designs for the yacht of Dryden Vos in Disney's Solo: A Star Wars Story (2018). The main building was also depicted in the science-fiction film Gattaca (1997), the first film since THX 1138 to be shot at the Civic Center. The thriller film DreamQuil (2016) used the main building as a filming location as well. Music albums have also been recorded at the Civic Center, including parts of Peter Frampton's live album Frampton Comes Alive! (1976) and The Grateful Dead's In the Dark (1987). The music video for the 2011 Dr. Dre song "I Need a Doctor" was filmed at the Civic Center as well.

== See also ==
- List of Frank Lloyd Wright works
- List of National Historic Landmarks in California
- National Register of Historic Places listings in Marin County, California
