= Antonio Sotomayor =

American mural painter (1902-1985)

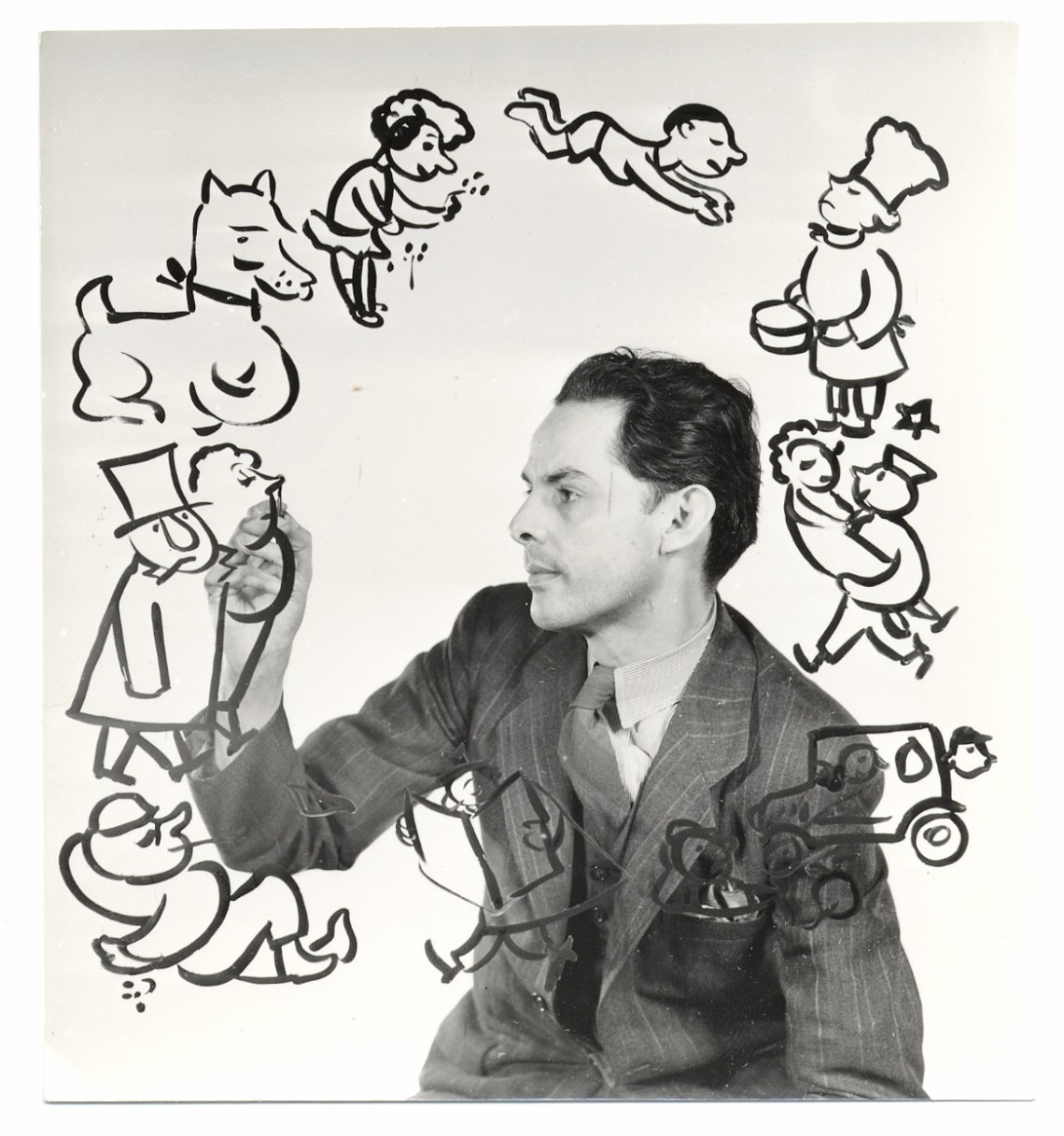
- Sotomayor Painting on Glass, c.1935.
- Born: May 13, 1902; Chulumani, Bolivia
- Died: February 10, 1985 (aged 82); San Francisco, California, U.S.
- Other name: Tony Sotomayor
- Education: Mark Hopkins Institute of Art
- Years active: 1923–1984
- Known for: Murals, Illustrations, Caricatures, Ceramics
- Spouse: Grace Eugenie LaMova Andrews Sotomayor

Antonio "Tony" Sotomayor (1902–1985) was a Bolivian-born American artist and educator, known as a painter and muralist. He also worked as an illustrator, caricaturist, designer, and ceramicist. He was nicknamed San Francisco's 'Artist Laureate'.

== Early life ==
Antonio Sotomayor was born on May 13, 1902, in Chulumani, Bolivia to parents Celia Meza and Juan Sotomayor. His family moved to La Paz when he was a teenager. He studied at Escuela de Bellas Artes in La Paz, with Belgian metal artist Adolfe Lambert.

== Career ==
In 1923, Sotomayor immigrated to San Francisco. He initially worked as a dishwasher at the Palace Hotel, a role that only lasted five days. While working at the Palace he learned English and he would paint caricatures of his co-workers at the hotel, eventually they made him the "artist in residence". In the 1930s he painted two murals at the Palace Hotel, in the room known as “The Pied Piper.” When he had first arrived in San Francisco he had wanted to be an architect, but over time he changed. He continued his studies at the Mark Hopkins Institute of Art (now San Francisco Art Institute).

In 1937, he painted El Tigrero (1937) mural for the Richard Neutra designed Arthur and Mona Hofmann House in nearby Hillsborough, California. In 1939, he created murals for the Peruvian Pavilion and the Fountain of the Pacific, (a 36 foot by 46 foot, terracotta relief map) for the Golden Gate International Exposition on Treasure Island, 1939–1940 (GGIE). The relief map was executed at Gladding McBean in Lincoln, California. The fountain is one of very few surviving artifacts of the GGIE still existing on Treasure Island. The Treasure Island Museum is making efforts to have the fountain restored and placed on display once again.

Sotomayor was an art professor at Mills College from 1942 to 1943. He taught art at California School of Fine Art (now the San Francisco Art Institute) from 1940 to 1950.

In 1945, he was invited to a reception at the Fairmont Hotel in San Francisco hosted by President Harry Truman in honor of the drafting and ratification of the Charter of the United Nations.

In 1967, Sotomayor and his wife Grace embarked on a tour of South America, which included stops in Chile and Bolivia.

In 1969, Sotomayor painted one of his masterpieces, called "The Party," which has been compared to Raphael's "The School of Athens." In his "The Party," Sotomayor recreates the history of art, beginning with the cave paintings of Lascaux and moving through Michelangelo, Raphael, Botticelli, Caravaggio, Rembrandt, Rubens, Durer, Velazquez, Goya, Renoir, Monet, Picasso, et al.

He had a strong interest in religious art. In 1982-83, Sotomayor painted a 30-panel mural for Grace Cathedral.

Sotomayor was a member of San Francisco Art Association; The Family; and Bohemian Club. For over a decade, he was a member of the San Francisco Arts Commission, and received their "Award of Honor" in 1978.

== Murals at Grace Cathedral, San Francisco ==
Mural of Gold Rush San Francisco Antonio Sotomayor 1983 Grace Cathedral

Mural of 1906 Earthquake and Great Fire San Francisco Antonio Sotomayor Grace Cathedral 1983

Mural of 1945 United Nations Charter San Francisco Antonio Sotomayor Grace Cathedral 1983

In late 1981, the dean of the cathedral, David Gillespie, persuaded the Board of Trustees to embark on a beautification of Grace Cathedral as a memorial to a parishioner who had died in an accident in Marin County. The project provided for six large murals, three on each side of the interior nave of the cathedral. Together, the six large murals, each encompassing 5 bays divided by small pillars, would illustrate key moments in the history of San Francisco and life of the Anglican/Episcopalian religious community. These milestones were (1) 1849 California Gold Rush during which a small wooden chapel was erected and named Grace Chapel; (2) 1906 Great earthquake and fire during which Grace Church, a mostly stone structure, was destroyed; (3) 1945 Drafting and ratification in San Francisco of the Charter of the United Nations; (4) 1964 completion of the final phase of construction of the new Grace Cathedral (a structure made of pre-stressed concrete); (5) 1966 commencement of the new school year at Cathedral School for Boys; (6) 1981 the installation of the new Anglican/Episcopalian Bishop Myers at Grace Cathedral in the presence of leaders of the Orthodox, Roman Catholic, Protestant, and Jewish religions. Sotomayor included himself, his wife, friend and art critic Alexander Fried, family friend Robert Darden, the archivist of Grace Cathedral Michael Lampen, a student from Kenya employed by the Sotomayors, as well as cathedral benefactor Murphy and his two grown children, in the mural of the 1945 drafting and ratification of the Charter of the United Nations.

On January 19, 1982, Sotomayor signed a two-page contract with Grace Cathedral, represented by its dean David Gillespie, to paint the six murals for $2,000 each, for a grand total of $60,000. He completed the work in October 1983.

== Death and legacy ==
Sotomayor died on February 10, 1985, at San Francisco Community Hospice, after a battle with cancer. His work is included in various public museum collections including Fine Arts Museums of San Francisco, Museum of Modern Art, among others. His archive can be found at the San Francisco Public Library's History Center.

In October 2026, following the publication of detailed feature article about Sotomayor's murals at Grace Cathedral by Javier Gonzalez-Sfeir in a Bolivian newspaper, Sotomayor's painting of the Chilean Huaso in the mural of 1849 Gold Rush San Francisco created renewed interest as a possible symbol of fraternal reconciliation between Bolivia and Chile following the official visit of Chilean president Jose Antonio Kast to the Bolivian capital of La Paz, the first such visit in 71 years.

== Personal life ==
He was married to Grace Eugenie LaMova Andrews Sotomayor in 1927. They never had any children. Grace Andrews birth name was Grace Eugenie LaMova (her family lived in the Italian-American neighborhood North Beach), and, after being orphaned by the 1906 earthquake and fire, she was adopted by the Andrews family. For forty years they lived in the Nob Hill neighborhood at no. 3 Leroy Place in San Francisco, two blocks from Grace Cathedral.

== Bibliography ==
Books with illustrations by Sotomayor.

- Jessup, Marie H.; Simpson, Lesley B. (1936). Indian Tales From Guatemala. Antonio Sotomayor (Illustrator). New York City, NY: Charles Scribner's Sons.
- Sauer, Carl (1939). Man in Nature. Antonio Sotomayor (Illustrator), Aileen Corwin (maps). New York City, NY: Charles Scribner's Sons.
- Von Hagen, Victor Wolfgang; Hawkins, Quail (1939). Quetzal Quest: A Story Of The Capture of The Quetzal, The Sacred Bird of the Aztecs and Mayans. New York City, NY: Harcourt, Brace and Company.
- Bagnani, Gilbert (1964). The Satyricon of Petronius. William Burnaby (translation), Antonio Sotomayor (illustration) (Limited edition of 1,500 numbered copies ed.). New York City, New York: The Heritage Press.

== See also ==
- List of people from San Francisco
