= Nowiński =

Nowiński (feminine: Nowińska, plural: Nowińscy) is a surname originating from Polish. Notable people with the surname include:

- Christopher Nowinski (born 1978), American author and former professional wrestler
- Ira Nowinski (born 1942), American photographer
- Hanna Konarowska-Nowińska (born 1983), Polish actress
