= Fairmount Hotel =

Fairmount Hotel or The Fairmount Hotel may refer to:

- Fairmount Hotel (Portland, Oregon)
- Fairmount Hotel (San Antonio, Texas)
- Fairmount Apartments (Jersey City, New Jersey)

== See also ==
- Fairmont Hotel (disambiguation)
