= Fairmont Hotel =

Fairmont Hotel may refer to:

- Fairmont Hotels and Resorts, a Canada-based operator of luxury hotels and resorts
  - Fairmont Nile City, a hotel in Cairo next to the Nile River, in Egypt
  - Fairmont Palliser Hotel, a 1914 hotel in Calgary, Alberta, of the Fairmont Hotels and Resorts chain
  - Hotel Vancouver, branded currently as the Fairmont Hotel Vancouver
  - Fairmont San Francisco, California
  - Fairmont San Jose, California
- Fairmont Hotel (San Antonio, Texas)
- Fairmont Hotel (Spokane, Washington), listed on the National Register of Historic Places in Spokane County, Washington

== See also ==
- The Roosevelt New Orleans, formerly the Fairmont New Orleans
- Fairmont Olympic Hotel (Seattle), a historic hotel in downtown Seattle, Washington
- Fairmount Hotel (disambiguation)
