= Arthur and Mona Hofmann House =

- U.S. National Register of Historic Places
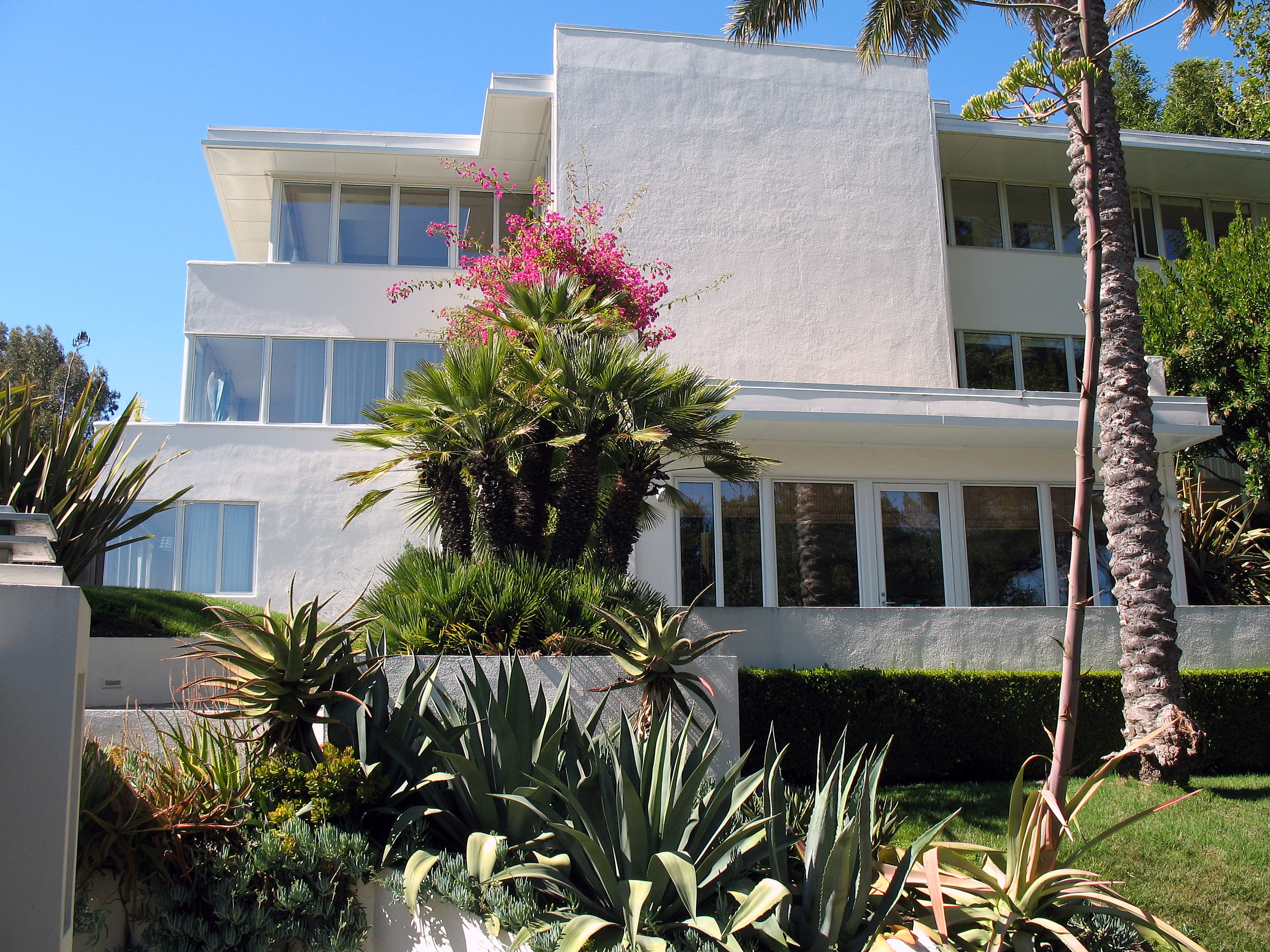

- Location within San Francisco Bay Area Location within California Location within the United States
- Location: 1048 Cuesta Road, Hillsborough, California
- Coordinates: 37.550512°N 122.3504433°W
- Built: 1937
- Architect: Richard Neutra
- Architectural style: International Style (architecture)
- NRHP reference No.: 91000926
- Added to NRHP: 1991

Arthur and Mona Hofmann House, also known as the Hofmann House, is a historic home built in 1937 at 1048 Cuesta Road in Hillsborough, California. The building was designed by Modernist architect Richard Neutra in International Style. It has been listed on the National Register of Historic Places since August 5, 1991. The house is a private residence and not open to the public.

== History ==
Arthur Hofmann (1898–1979), and his artist wife, Mona (1910–1971) were introduced to architect Richard Neutra by Dr. Sidney Joseph and his wife Emily of San Francisco. Mona Hofmann had been a painting assistant to Diego Rivera for his mural Man, Controller of the Universe, and Pan American Unity, where she also is a subject in the latter Rivera mural (in panel 2). Emily Joseph had been a translator for Diego Rivera in 1930–1931.

The Hofmann house was Neutra's first large San Francisco Bay Area home design. He worked on the architectural design of this house with his collaborator Otto Winkler. The 4200 sq. ft. house is a stucco house with three stories and a flat roof that overhangs, with an irregular, rectangular plan. In 1991, the Hoffman house was the least altered home designed by Neutra outside of Southern California.

Artist Antonio Sotomayor (1902–1985) painted a mural on one wall of the southwest wing, El Tigrero (1937). At some point the mural was painted over and then restored. The theme of a tige mural was from a story about Hofmann and a failed tiger hunt in Brazil.

The Hofmann's supported Modernism in the arts and advocated for Neutra's work. Mona was proud of the home she often spoke publicly in interviews. This home won design awards including the second prize for House Beautiful magazine (1937), historical renovations of the house were honored by the American Institute of Architects (AIA) of San Mateo County chapter (1992), amongst others.

== See also ==
- National Register of Historic Places listings in San Mateo County, California
