= American Hebrew Academy =

American college-preparatory school in North Carolina

Location
- 4334 Hobbs Road; Greensboro, North Carolina 27410; United States; 36°06′32″N 79°52′15″W

Information
- Religious affiliation: None
- Established: 2001
- CEEB code: 341579
- Campus: Gated, 100 acres (0.4 km²)
- Website: www.americanhebrewacademy.org

American Hebrew Academy is a non-profit 501(c)(3) domiciled in North Carolina. Previously it was an international college-preparatory school located in Greensboro, North Carolina. It was open to students of all faiths but was originally founded as a Jewish international school, American Hebrew Academy, the only such school in the world for boarding and day students between 9th and 12th grade. The coeducational school's 100-acre (40 ha) campus was designed by Aaron Green, protégé of renowned architect Frank Lloyd Wright. The school closed in June 2019 but later announced plans to reopen for the 2021–2022 school year. A reopening as AHA International School never occurred.

== History ==
American Hebrew Academy opened in 2001, known as "AHA". The school was founded by several leaders in Jewish education, including Alvin Mars, to create a pluralistic learning and leadership environment. The initial objective of the school was simply to create a high school option for the local Jewish community near Greensboro, and to draw a critical mass of students from other regions of the country where Jewish day school was not a feasible option. Subsequent to the school's founding, the school's unique identity as a coed, pluralistic Jewish boarding school attracted students globally and hosted a diverse student body from over 35 countries.

The academy's inception was sponsored and spearheaded by Maurice "Chico" Sabbah, a philanthropist, businessman, Sephardic Jew, and Zionist, and longtime resident of Greensboro. Sabbah's nephew, Glenn Drew, continued to manage the school and served as CEO executive director, and General Counsel since the school's beginning. Drew resigned in November 2020.

Board members included Leeor Sabbah, Glenn Drew, Joseph Weilgus, Joel Fleishman of Duke University, investor Michael Steinhardt, Jehuda Reinharz of Brandeis University, Marsha Cohen, Bonnie Lipton, Scott Shay of Signature Bank, Douglas Greene, Abe Tawil and Larry Heyman.

== Closing and rebranding ==
On June 11, 2019, Glenn Drew notified community members that the school would close after 18 years, citing financial distress. The news was broadly reported as abrupt and unexpected. On September 13, 2019 the academy announced plans to reopen in for the 2020-2021 school year.

In May 2020, the academy announced plans to rebrand itself for reopening in 2021, after negotiating a $26 million debt refinancing from a Chinese education company Puxin Limited. As part of its rebranding, the school would encourage international enrollment, including countries in the Middle East and Asia.

The academy was briefly rebranded as AHA International School and was scheduled to reopen in September 2021. As part of its reopening, the school's college prep program was expanded to place a higher emphasis on Advanced Placement courses and professional experience opportunities for students. The rebranded AHA International School also released a video announcing that campus tours would resume in September 2020, and students would be admitted for classes beginning in August 2021. Abe Tawil served as head of school. Due to the global COVID-19 pandemic, the school did not reopen.

In July 2022, The Department of Health and Human Services (HHS) announced a $50 million dollar 5-year lease of the campus to use as a transitional housing facility for unaccompanied migrant children. The HHS plans for the campus included hosting up to 800 unaccompanied minors, ages 13–17. AHA planned to operate an educational program for the children hosted on the campus according to educational requirements of the State of North Carolina. This program was known as Greensboro Global Academy. In January 2025, HHS announced the closure of the site, effective April 1, 2025. No children were ever hosted on the campus through the HHS program.

== Campus ==
The location is a 100-acre (40 ha) campus, adjacent to a 22-acre (8.9 ha) lake. Following a national architectural competition to design the campus, Frank Lloyd Wright’s associate architect, Aaron Green, was commissioned to create the master plan for the campus and building designs for every building the academy would eventually need for the immediate future and for years to come.

American Hebrew Academy had, as of 2016, the largest closed-loop geothermal exchange well field in the United States to heat and cool its campus. In 2016, the academy dedicated the new Charlotte K. Frank Center for Plant Science & Ecology which provides a state of the art research and experimentation facility for advancing the study of hydroponics, aquaculture, soil and water conservation and Israel's leadership in the development of agricultural technology.

As of April 2025, the campus, which is available for rent or sale, remains under maintenance with no active programs.
