= Ling Po (artist) =

Architecture rendering artist (1917–2014)

Ling Po and Frank Lloyd Wright in Taliesin West drafting room

in Taliesin East drafting room

Ling Po (born Chow Yi Hsien, 周儀先, aka Zhou Yixian in Beijing, China on April 28, 1917; died April 28, 2014) was an artist and apprentice to Frank Lloyd Wright. Chow's English name "Ling Po" was coined by Wright by combining Chow's ancestral home Ningbo (then Romanized as Ning Po) and the famous Chinese poet Li Bai (then Romanized as Li Po).

One of the last delineators, or rendering artists, of Frank Lloyd Wright buildings, he worked on the Frank Lloyd Wright renderings of the Guggenheim Museum interior, the Lenkurt Electric Company, and the Arizona State Capitol. The son of a Chinese Nationalist general and an artist, and an apprentice to Frank Lloyd Wright, Ling Po is best known for his architectural renderings, drawings, landscapes, and his architectural approach to creating sculpture. Ling Po left war-torn China to work in America, in 1945, under provisions of the Lend-Lease Act. He was particularly interested in industrial science and design. Upon his arrival in America, he worked briefly in Washington, DC, at the office of Marcel Breuer, and in New York with Morris B. Sanders Jr., an architect who was noted for using plastics to great advantage in modern design.

In 1946, he joined Wright's fabled Taliesin Fellowship. Soon, he was summoned back to China to lead his ailing mother out of harm's way during the communist revolution. Stalled in San Francisco on his return to China, Ling Po aids Wright and William Wesley Peters on working drawings for Wright's V. C. Morris Gift Shop design. After moving his mother to safer ground in the remote Kunming, Ling appeals to Wright and is granted a return to Taliesin with his mother. Ling Po went on to render subsequent Frank Lloyd Wright designs, design and delineate buildings for the Taliesin Associated Architects, and exhibit his art in shows from Wisconsin to California. The Smithsonian Institution, holds a Frank Lloyd Wright textile design in its collection that was executed by Ling Po. He is a contributing artist to Frank Lloyd Wright US Stamp design which was drawn by Patricia Armantides and Ling Po with lettering by Vernon Swaback and technical revisions by John Armantides.

== Early life ==
When he was old enough to hold a brush, Ling's mother tutored him in calligraphy. He spent a couple hours each day learning how to handle a brush, writing Chinese characters. Later, he studied mathematics and literature with a tutor. Ling's mother loved to paint and aptly perceiving her boy's gift enrolled him at age nine in the school of artist Chao Ho Cheng. Ling was deeply influenced by Master Cheng, the artist schoolmaster and art collector who also educated Ling's father. Here, Ling Po learned how to paint in the Chinese tradition, in the midst of a collection of paintings, scrolls, and calligraphy which surveyed 500 years of art in China. Master Cheng encouraged the boy to join a gathering of adult artists who met each Sunday to paint and write poetry. He later studied architecture at Central University in Chungking, where he first encountered Wright's work. He went on to study at the Art Institute of Chicago before becoming an apprentice at Taliesin and an instructor at the Frank Lloyd Wright School of Architecture.

== Gallery ==
Gallery
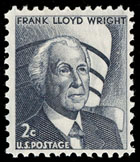
drawn by Patricia Armantides and Ling Po with lettering by Vernon Swaback and technical revisions by John Armantides
