= Ira Nowinski =

Photographer

Ira Nowinski is a photographer. Nowinski earned a Master of Fine Art's degree from the San Francisco Art Institute in 1973. From the late 1970s through the early 1980s, Nowinski served as the official photographer of the San Francisco Opera. His photographs have been collected extensively by the University of California, Berkeley's Bancroft Library; Stanford University Libraries' Department of Special Collections; Bibliothèque Nationale in Paris; the Museum of Modern Art, New York, and the National Museum of Photography, Bradford, England.

He has worked on three major photographic projects documenting various aspects of the Jewish experience in the 20th Century: In Fitting Memory: The Art and Politics of Holocaust Memorials; Karaite Jews in Egypt, Israel, and the San Francisco Bay Area; and Soviet Jews in San Francisco.

His current projects include a photographic exploration of the Galapagos Islands.

He has had major exhibitions of his photography at the Stanford University Libraries' Peterson Gallery in 2004 and the Judah L. Magnes Museum in 2007.

== Biography ==
Ira Nowinski, an American photographer of Polish and Hungarian Jewish descent, was born in 1942 in New York City and raised in New Rochelle, NY. At the age of 42, he was prodded by opera singer Regina Resnick to do a photo essay around the Jewish milieu. He had previously done photo essays of the North Beach, San Francisco, area, of the evacuation of elderly citizens from hotels in the South of Market area of San Francisco, and of the Southeast Asian Community in the same city. In addition, he had been the staff photographer of the San Francisco Opera since 1978.

Working first with Resnick and then with Seymour Fromer of the Judah L. Magnes Museum, Rhonda Abrams of the Anti-Defamation League, Anita Friedman of Jewish Family & Children's Services, and the Northern California Board of Rabbis, Nowinski began documenting the Jewish experience in the San Francisco Bay Area. One of his first projects was to document Soviet Jews who had immigrated during the 1970s and 1980s.

He also photographed the Karaite Jewish Community in Foster City. The Karaites were a Jewish community that had lived for nearly 500 years in Egypt. The Arab-Israeli war resulted in the expulsion of the Jews from Egypt at the conclusion of that conflict. Many subsequently immigrated first to Israel and then to Northern California. Nowinski retraced their migration route in reverse, first photographing Karaites in Foster City, California, then in Israel, and finally in Egypt.

Nowinski and Sybil Milton of the U.S. Holocaust Museum did a joint work on the Holocaust Memorials throughout Europe, Israel, and in the United States. This work, entitled "In fitting memory : the art and politics of Holocaust memorials" combined text provided by Milton with Nowinski's photographic essay of the monuments documenting the millions of Jews who lost their lives under the Nazi regime.

== Bibliography ==
- Milton, Sybil and Ira Nowinski. In fitting memory : the art and politics of Holocaust memorials. Detroit : Wayne State University Press; Berkeley : Judah L. Magnes Museum, ©1991. ISBN 0-8143-2066-X (10 digit) ISBN 978-0-8143-2066-2 (13 digit)
- Nowinski, Ira. Ira Nowinski photographs of pioneer Jewish cemeteries, 1984. Judah L. Magnes Memorial Museum. OCLC Number 71267095
- Nowinski, Ira. Ira Nowinski : the photographer as witness. [Stanford, CA] : Stanford University Libraries, ©2004. ISBN 0-911221-33-6 (10 digit) ISBN 978-0-911221-33-6 (13 digit)
- Nowinski, Ira. Ira Nowinski - the studio of Man Ray. Tucson : Nazraeli Press [u.a.], 2006. ISBN 1-59005-137-8 (10 digit) ISBN 978-1-59005-137-5 (13 digit)
- Nowinski, Ira. Ira Nowinski's San Francisco-Poets, Politics, and Diva. Berkeley, Calif. : Bancroft Library, University of California, Berkeley : Heyday Books, ©2006. ISBN 1-59714-040-6 (10 digit) ISBN 978-1-59714-040-9 (13 digit)
