= Fairmount Hotel (San Antonio, Texas) =

- The Fairmount Hotel
- U.S. National Register of Historic Places
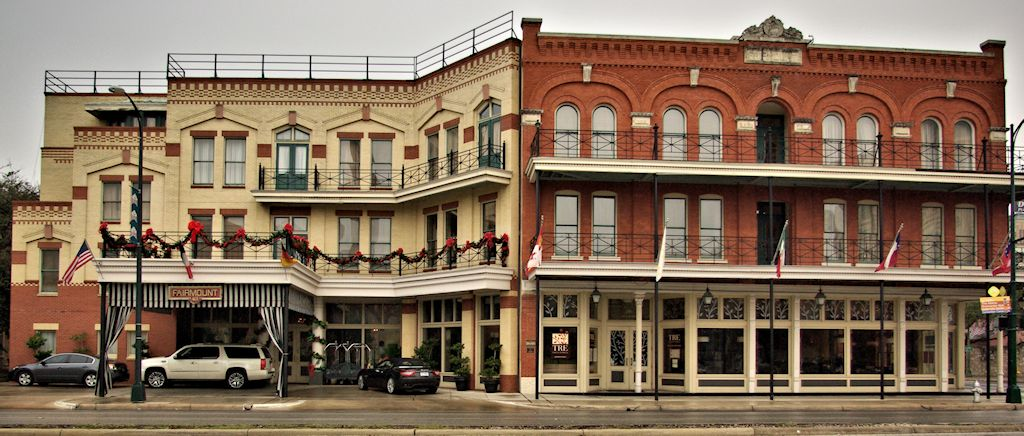
- Fairmount Hotel

- Location within Texas Location within the United States
- Location: 401 S. Alamo, San Antonio, Texas
- Coordinates: 29°25′13″N 98°29′17″W
- Area: less than one acre
- Built: 1906, 1986
- Built by: J.P. Haynes
- Architect: Dielmann, Leo M.J.
- NRHP reference No.: 88000753
- Added to NRHP: June 30, 1988

The Fairmount Hotel in San Antonio, Texas was built in 1906. It was moved about six blocks through downtown San Antonio in 1985 and was expanded in 1986. It was listed on the National Register of Historic Places in 1988.

It is one of few former small "drummer", someone who "drums up" business, hotels in San Antonio used by traveling salesmen, who would stay at the hotel due to its affordable rates.
