= Alexander Fried =

American art critic (1902–1988)

- Born: May 21, 1902; New York City, U.S.
- Died: May 9, 1988 (aged 85); San Francisco, California, U.S.
- Education: Columbia University
- Occupation: Art critic
- Spouse: Edith Trumpler
- Children: 2 daughters

Alexander Fried (May 21, 1902 - May 9, 1988) was an American art and music critic for the San Francisco Chronicle and The San Francisco Examiner.

== Life ==
Fried was born in New York City on May 21, 1902. He was introduced to opera at a young age. He attended Columbia University, where he earned a bachelor's degree, followed by a master's degree.

Fried began his career as the editor of Musical Digest in New York City. He was the music and dance editor of the San Francisco Chronicle from 1924 to 1936, and the music and art editor of The San Francisco Examiner from 1936 to 1977. According to Fried, "Criticism is a bridge between the arts and the public. It is a bridge over which an ideal critic leads the public in the arts with all possible enthusiasm, sensibility and knowledge."

Fried married Edith Trumpler, a German immigrant. They had two daughters, Harriet Fried and Madelyn English. Fried suffered from Alzheimer's disease, and he retired in the Jewish Home for the Aged. He died of a heart attack on May 9, 1988, in San Francisco, California, at age 85. His widow died in 2017.
