= Dirden =

Dirden is a surname. Notable people with the surname include:

- Brandon J. Dirden (born 1978), American actor
- Charles Dirden III (born 1970), American actor and comedian
- Johnnie Dirden (born 1954), American football player

== See also ==
- Darden (disambiguation)
- Durden
