= Angela Davis =

American academic and political activist (born 1944)

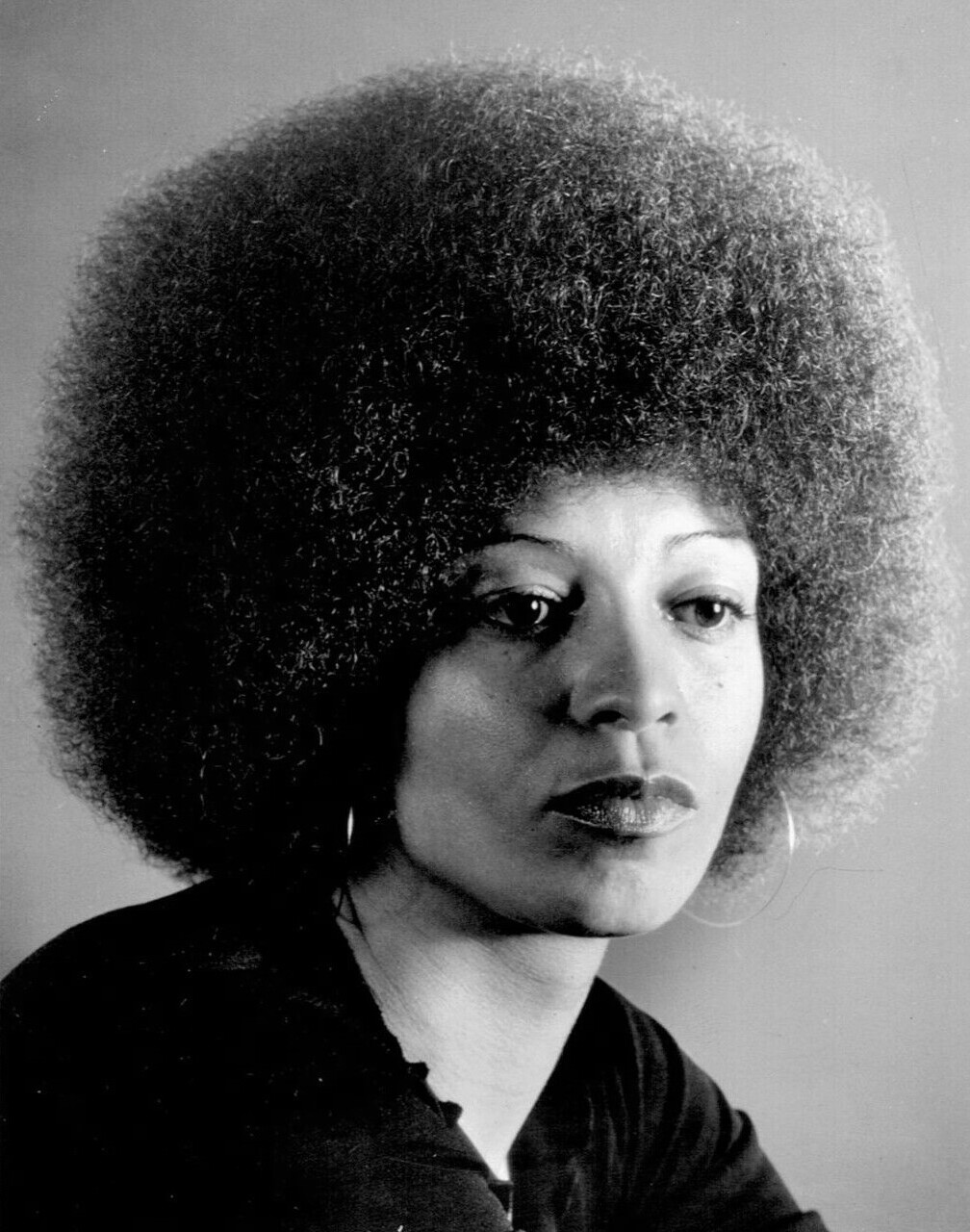
- Davis in 1974
- Born: Angela Yvonne Davis; January 26, 1944 (age 82); Birmingham, Alabama, U.S.
- Occupations: Activist; philosopher; academic; author; social theorist
- Political party: See list: CCDS (from 1991); Communist Party USA (1968–1991); Black Panther Party (1968–1969)
- Spouse: Hilton Braithwaite (m. 1980; div. 1983)
- Partner: Gina Dent
- Relatives: Ben Davis (brother); Eisa Davis (niece)
- Awards: Lenin Peace Prize

Education
- Education: Brandeis University (BA); University of Frankfurt; University of California, San Diego (MA); Humboldt University
- Academic advisor: Herbert Marcuse

Philosophical work
- Era: Contemporary philosophy
- Region: Western philosophy
- School: Critical theory; Black feminism; Marxism
- Institutions: University of California, Los Angeles San Francisco State University; University of California, Santa Cruz
- Main interests: Social theory; socialism; prison abolition; intersectionality; Black Marxism
- Notable works: Women, Race and Class (1981); Are Prisons Obsolete? (2003)

Angela Yvonne Davis (born January 26, 1944) is an American Marxist feminist political activist, philosopher, academic, and author. She is Distinguished Professor Emerita of Feminist Studies and History of Consciousness at the University of California, Santa Cruz. Davis was a longtime member of the Communist Party USA (CPUSA), running for Vice President in the 1980 and 1984 elections under that party. She is also a founding member of the Committees of Correspondence for Democracy and Socialism (CCDS). She has been active in movements such as the Occupy movement and the Boycott, Divestment and Sanctions campaign.

Davis was born in Birmingham, Alabama; she studied at Brandeis University and the University of Frankfurt. She also studied at the University of California, San Diego, before moving to East Germany, where she completed some studies for a doctorate at the Humboldt-University of Berlin. After returning to the United States, she joined the CPUSA and became involved in the second-wave feminist movement and the campaign against the Vietnam War.

In 1969, she was hired as an assistant professor of philosophy at the University of California, Los Angeles (UCLA). UCLA's governing Board of Regents soon fired her due to her membership in the CPUSA. After a court ruled the firing illegal, the university fired her for the use of inflammatory language. In 1970, guns belonging to Davis were used in an armed takeover of a courtroom in Marin County, California, in which four people were killed. Prosecuted for three capital felonies, including conspiracy to murder, she was held in jail for more than a year, before being acquitted of all charges in 1972. While in prison, she was often considered a political prisoner.

In 1991, amid the dissolution of the Soviet Union, she broke away from the CPUSA to help establish the CCDS. That same year, she joined the feminist studies department at the University of California, Santa Cruz, where she became department director before retiring in 2008. In 1997, she co-founded Critical Resistance, an organization working to abolish the prison–industrial complex.

Davis has received various awards, including the Soviet Union's Lenin Peace Prize (its last living recipient since 2025) and induction into the National Women's Hall of Fame. Due to accusations that she advocates political violence and due to her support of the Soviet Union, she has been a controversial figure. In 2020, she was listed as the 1971 "Woman of the Year" in Time magazine's "100 Women of the Year" edition. In 2020, she was included on Time's list of the 100 most influential people in the world. In 2025, Davis was awarded an Honorary Doctorate in Letters from the University of Cambridge.

== Early life ==
Davis (left) as a child in Birmingham, Alabama, 1947

Angela Davis was born on January 26, 1944, in Birmingham, Alabama. She was christened at her father's Episcopal church. Her family lived in the "Dynamite Hill" neighborhood, which was marked in the 1950s by the bombings of houses in an attempt to intimidate and drive out middle-class black people who had moved there. Davis occasionally spent time on her uncle's farm and with friends in New York City. Her siblings include two brothers, Ben and Reginald, and a sister, Fania. Ben played defensive back for the Cleveland Browns and Detroit Lions in the late 1960s and early 1970s.

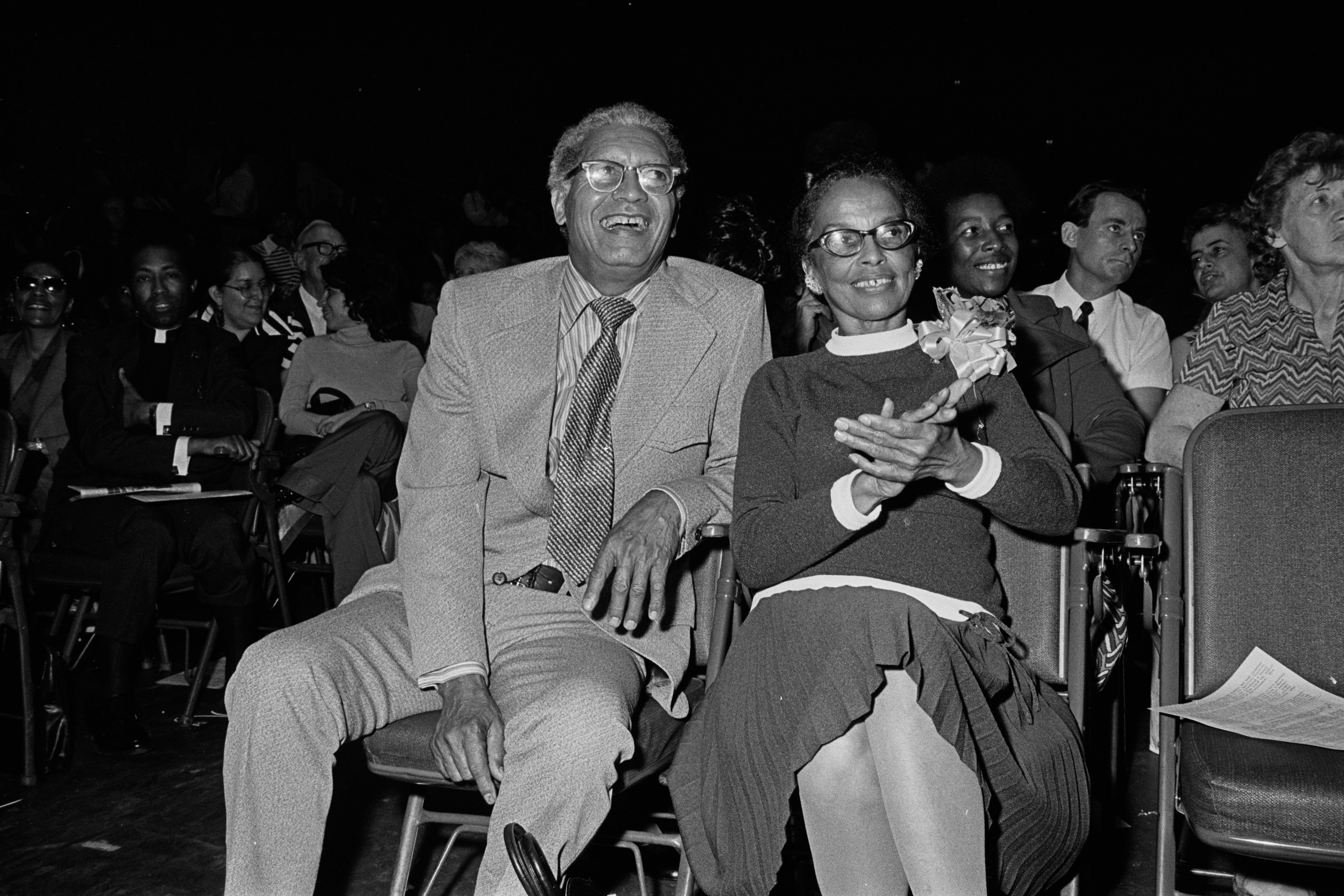
Davis's parents, Frank and Sallye, in 1972

Davis attended Carrie A. Tuggle School, a segregated black elementary school, and later, Parker Annex, a middle-school branch of Parker High School in Birmingham. During this time, Davis's mother, Sallye Bell Davis, was a national officer and leading organizer of the Southern Negro Youth Congress, an organization influenced by the Communist Party aimed at building alliances among African Americans in the South. Davis grew up surrounded by communist organizers and thinkers, who significantly influenced her intellectual development. Among them was the Southern Negro Youth Congress official Louis E. Burnham, whose daughter Margaret Burnham was Davis's friend from childhood, as well as her co-counsel during Davis's 1971 trial for murder and kidnapping.

Davis was involved in her church youth group as a child and attended Sunday school regularly. She attributes much of her political involvement to her involvement with the Girl Scouts of the United States of America. She also participated in the Girl Scouts 1959 national roundup in Colorado. As a Girl Scout, she marched and picketed to protest racial segregation in Birmingham.

By her junior year of high school, Davis had been accepted by an American Friends Service Committee (Quaker) program that placed black students from the South in integrated schools in the North. She chose Elisabeth Irwin High School in Greenwich Village. There, she was recruited by a communist youth group, Advance.

== Education ==
=== Brandeis University ===
Davis was awarded a scholarship to Brandeis University in Waltham, Massachusetts, where she was one of three black students in her class. She encountered the Frankfurt School philosopher Herbert Marcuse at a rally during the Cuban Missile Crisis and became his student. In a 2007 television interview, Davis said: "Herbert Marcuse taught me that it was possible to be an academic, an activist, a scholar, and a revolutionary." She worked part-time to earn enough money to travel to France and Switzerland and attended the eighth World Festival of Youth and Students in Helsinki, Finland. She returned home in 1963 to a Federal Bureau of Investigation interview about her attendance at the communist-sponsored festival.

During her second year at Brandeis, Davis decided to major in French and continued her study of philosopher and writer Jean-Paul Sartre. She was accepted by the Hamilton College Junior Year in France Program. Classes were initially at Biarritz and later at the Sorbonne. In Paris, she and other students lived with a French family. She was in Biarritz when she learned of the 1963 Birmingham church bombing, committed by members of the Ku Klux Klan, in which four black girls were killed; she had been personally acquainted with the victims.

While completing her degree in French, Davis realized that her primary area of interest was philosophy. She was particularly interested in Marcuse's ideas. On returning to Brandeis, she sat in on his course. She wrote in her autobiography that Marcuse was approachable and helpful. She began making plans to attend the University of Frankfurt for graduate work in philosophy. In 1965, she graduated magna cum laude, a member of Phi Beta Kappa.

=== University of Frankfurt ===
In West Germany, with a monthly stipend of $100, she lived first with a German family and later with a group of students in a loft in an old factory. After visiting East Berlin during the annual May Day celebration, she felt that the East German government was dealing better with the residual effects of fascism than were the West Germans. Many of her roommates were active in the radical Socialist German Student Union (SDS), and Davis participated in some SDS actions. Events in the United States, including the formation of the Black Panther Party and the transformation of Student Nonviolent Coordinating Committee (SNCC) to an all-black organization, drew her interest upon her return.

=== Postgraduate work ===
Marcuse had moved to a position at the University of California, San Diego, and Davis followed him there after her two years in Frankfurt. Davis traveled to London to attend a conference on "The Dialectics of Liberation". The black contingent at the conference included the Trinidadian-American Stokely Carmichael and the British Michael X. Although moved by Carmichael's rhetoric, Davis was reportedly disappointed by her colleagues' black nationalist sentiments and their rejection of communism as a "white man's thing".

She joined the Che-Lumumba Club, an all-black branch of the Communist Party USA named for revolutionaries Che Guevara and Patrice Lumumba, of Cuba and Congo, respectively.

Davis earned a master's degree from the University of California, San Diego, in 1968. She completed some work for a PhD at the University of California, San Diego, around 1970 but never received a degree because her manuscripts were confiscated by the FBI. Instead, two years later, she received three honorary doctorates: In August 1972 from Moscow State University, and from the University of Tashkent during that same visit, and in September 1972 from the Karl-Marx University in Leipzig, Germany. In 1981, she returned to East Berlin, East Germany to continue working on her PhD.

== Professor at the University of California, Los Angeles, 1969–1970 ==
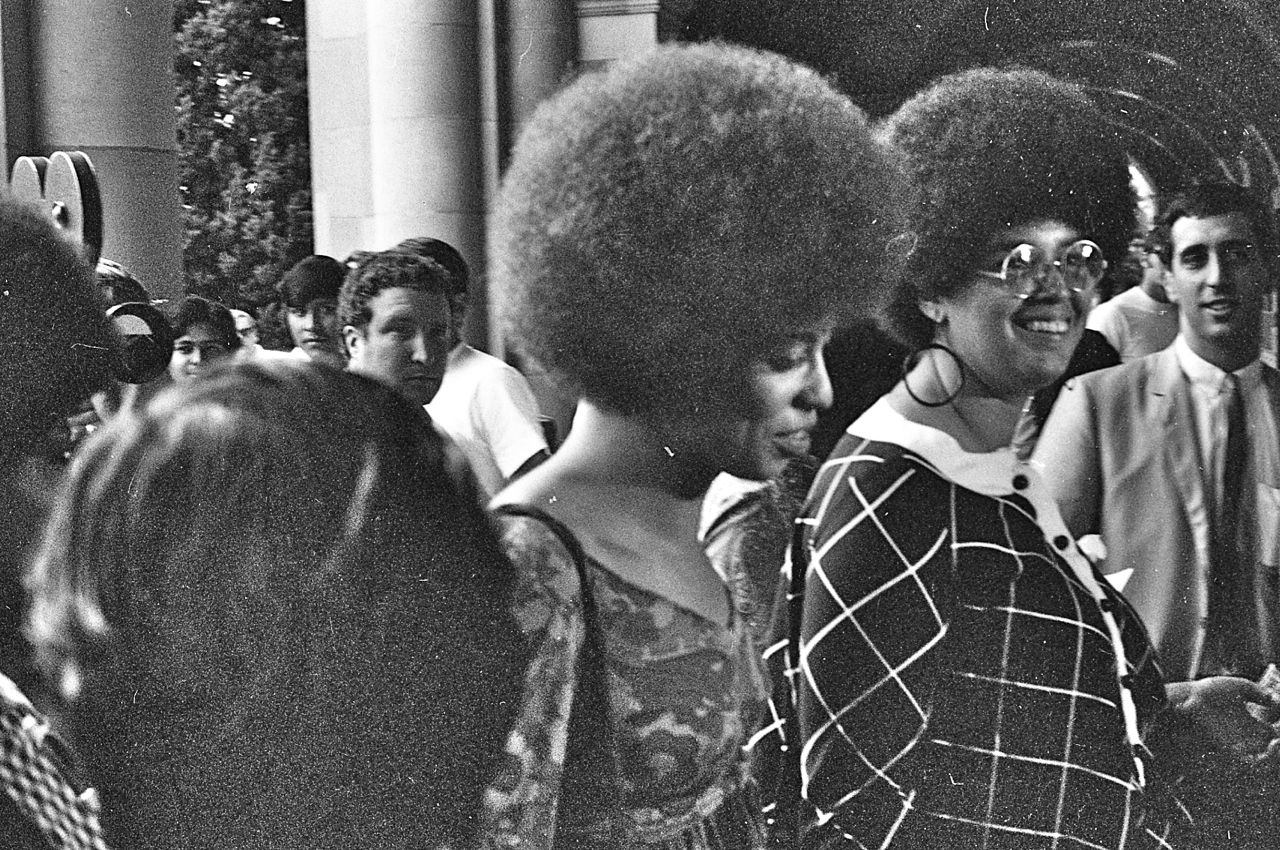
Davis (center, without glasses) enters Royce Hall with Kendra Alexander at UCLA for her first lecture, October 1969

Beginning in 1969, Davis was an acting assistant professor in the philosophy department at the University of California, Los Angeles (UCLA). Although both Princeton and Swarthmore had tried to recruit her, she opted for UCLA because of its urban location. At that time, she was known as a radical feminist and activist, a member of the Communist Party USA, and an affiliate of the Los Angeles chapter of the Black Panther Party.

Davis had previously joined the Communist Party in 1968 and had become a member of the Black Panther Party, working with a branch of the Black Panther Party in Los Angeles, where she directed political education. When Black Panther Party leadership determined that party members could not also be affiliated with other parties, Davis retained her Communist Party membership although she continued to work with the Black Panther Party.

In 1969, the University of California initiated a policy against hiring Communists. At their September 19, 1969, meeting, the Board of Regents fired Davis from her $10,000-a-year post (equivalent to $67,250 in 2025) because of her membership in the Communist Party, urged on by California Governor and future president Ronald Reagan. Judge Jerry Pacht ruled the Regents could not fire Davis solely because of her affiliation with the Communist Party, and she resumed her post.

The Regents fired Davis again on June 20, 1970, for the "inflammatory language" she had used in four different speeches. The report stated, "We deem particularly offensive such utterances as her statement that the regents 'killed, brutalized [and] murdered' the People's Park demonstrators, and her repeated characterizations of the police as 'pigs'." The American Association of University Professors censured the board for this action.

== Arrest and trial ==
Davis was a supporter of the Soledad Brothers, three inmates who were accused and charged with the killing of a prison guard at Soledad Prison.

On August 7, 1970, heavily armed 17-year-old African-American high-school student Jonathan Jackson, whose brother was George Jackson, one of the three Soledad Brothers, gained control of a courtroom in Marin County, California. He armed the Black defendants and took Judge Harold Haley, Deputy District Attorney Gary W. Thomas, and three female jurors as hostages. As Jackson transported the hostages and three black defendants away from the courtroom in a van, one of the defendants, James McClain, shot at the police. The police returned fire.

The judge and three of the men were killed in the melee. One of the jurors, the prosecutor, and one of the attackers, Ruchell Magee, were injured. Although the judge was shot in the head with a blast from a shotgun which had been taped to his neck, he also suffered a chest wound from a bullet that may have been fired from outside the van. Evidence during the trial showed that either could have been fatal. Davis had purchased several of the firearms Jackson used in the attack, including the shotgun used to shoot Haley, which she bought at a San Francisco pawn shop two days before the incident. She was also found to have been corresponding with one of the inmates involved.

Davis had befriended George and Jonathan Jackson doing work attempting to free the Soledad Brothers. She had communicated frequently with George Jackson over letters and worked extensively with Jonathan Jackson in her work with the Soledad Brothers Defense Committee. She had grown close with the Jackson family in general during this time while working with them and speaking at events together.

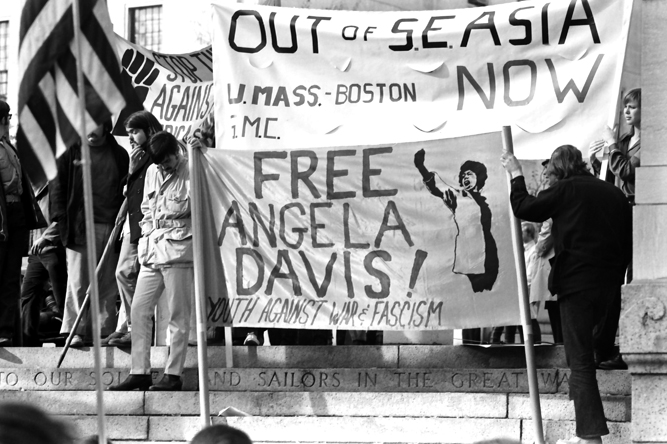
Protest against the Vietnam War, 1970

As California considers "all persons concerned in the commission of a crime, ... whether they directly commit the act constituting the offense, or aid and abet in its commission, ... are principals in any crime so committed", Davis was charged with "aggravated kidnapping and first degree murder in the death of Judge Harold Haley", and Marin County Superior Court Judge Peter Allen Smith issued a warrant for her arrest. Hours after the judge issued the warrant on August 14, 1970, a massive attempt to find and arrest Davis began. On August 18, four days after the warrant was issued, the FBI director J. Edgar Hoover listed Davis on the FBI's Ten Most Wanted Fugitive List; she was the third woman and the 309th person to be listed. Soon after, Davis became a fugitive and fled California. According to her autobiography, during this time she hid in friends' homes and moved at night. On October 13, 1970, FBI agents found her at a Howard Johnson Motor Lodge in New York City. President Richard M. Nixon congratulated the FBI on its "capture of the dangerous terrorist Angela Davis".

On January 5, 1971, Davis appeared at Marin County Superior Court and declared her innocence before the court and nation: "I now declare publicly before the court, before the people of this country that I am innocent of all charges which have been leveled against me by the state of California." John Abt, general counsel of the Communist Party USA, was one of the first attorneys to represent Davis for her alleged involvement in the shootings.

While being held in the Women's Detention Center, Davis was initially segregated from other prisoners, in solitary confinement. With the help of her legal team, she obtained a federal court order to get out of the segregated area.

Flyer advertising a celebrity fundraiser for Davis's legal defense, featuring Ray Barretto, Jerry Butler, Carmen McRae, Pete Seeger, the Voices of East Harlem, and Ossie Davis

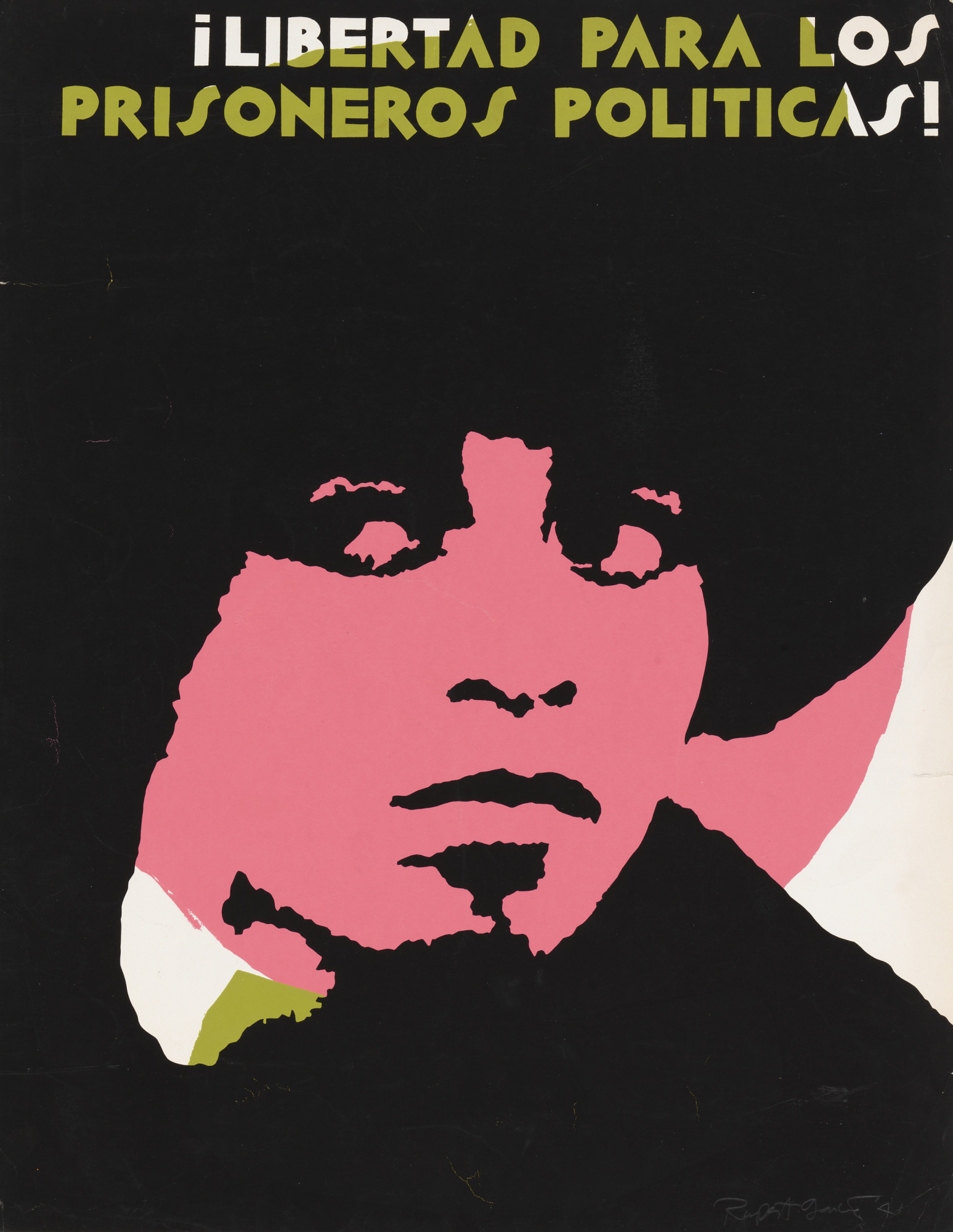
1971 poster by Rupert García urging freedom for political prisoners and depicting Angela Davis

Across the nation, thousands began organizing a movement to gain her release. In New York City, black writers formed a committee called the Black People in Defense of Angela Davis. By February 1971, more than 200 local committees in the United States, and 67 in foreign countries, worked to free Davis from jail. John Lennon and Yoko Ono contributed to this campaign with the song "Angela". In 1972, after a 16-month incarceration, the state allowed her release on bail from the county jail. On February 23, 1972, Rodger McAfee, a dairy farmer from Fresno, California, paid her $100,000 (equivalent to $582,800 in 2025) bail with the help of Steve Sparacino, a wealthy business owner. The United Presbyterian Church paid some of her legal defense expenses.

A defense motion for a change of venue was granted; they had requested the trial be held in San Francisco but that was refused and instead the trial was moved to Santa Clara County.

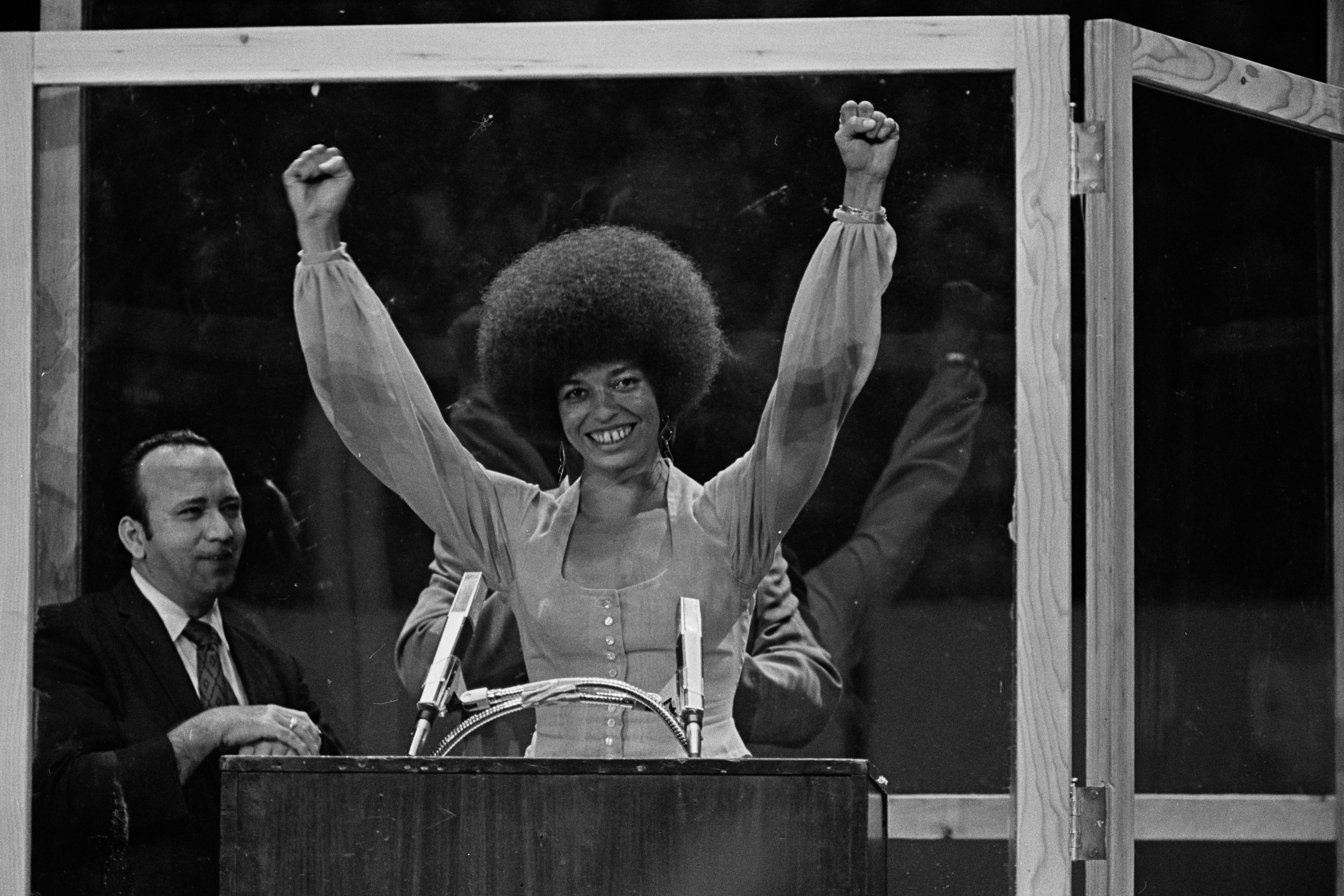
Davis greets supporters at a Madison Square Garden rally celebrating her acquittal, June 29, 1972. She stands behind a bulletproof shield installed following threats from the Jewish Defense League and other right-wing groups.

At the trial witnesses said that Davis had purchased the guns to protect the Soledad Brothers defense headquarters. On June 4, 1972, after 13 hours of deliberations, the all-white jury returned a verdict of not guilty. After the verdict, one juror, Ralph DeLange, made the Black Power salute to a crowd of spectators, which he later told reporters was to show "a unity of opinion for all oppressed people". Ten jurors later attended victory celebrations with the defense. The fact that she owned the guns used in the crime was judged insufficient to establish her role in the plot. She was represented by Howard Moore Jr. and Leo Branton Jr., who hired psychologists to help the defense determine who in the jury pool might favor their arguments, a technique that has since become more common. However, the defense were bitter that the jury was all-white. They also hired experts to challenge the reliability of eyewitness accounts.

== Other activities in the 1970s ==
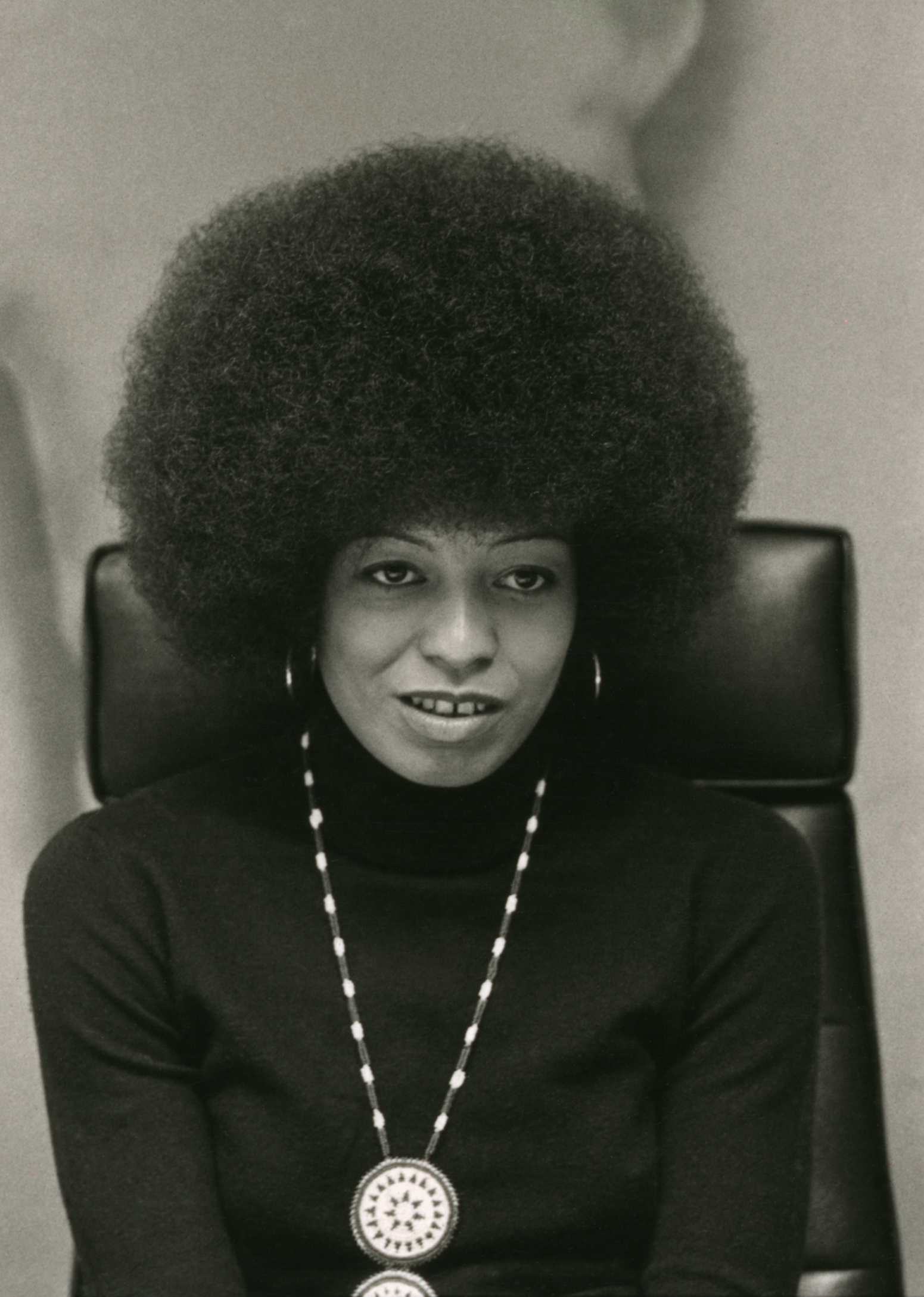
1974 portrait of Davis by Bernard Gotfryd

=== Cuba ===
After her acquittal, Davis went on an international speaking tour in 1972 and the tour included a trip to Cuba, where she had previously been received by Fidel Castro as a member of a CPUSA delegation in 1969. Robert F. Williams, Huey Newton and Stokely Carmichael had also visited Cuba, and Assata Shakur later moved there after she escaped from a U.S. prison. At a mass rally held by Afro-Cubans, Davis was reportedly barely able to speak because her reception was so enthusiastic. She perceived that Cuba was a racism-free country, which led her to believe that "only under socialism could the fight against racism be successfully executed." When she returned to the U.S., her socialist leanings increasingly influenced her understanding of racial struggles. In 1974, she attended the Second Congress of the Federation of Cuban Women.

=== Soviet Union ===
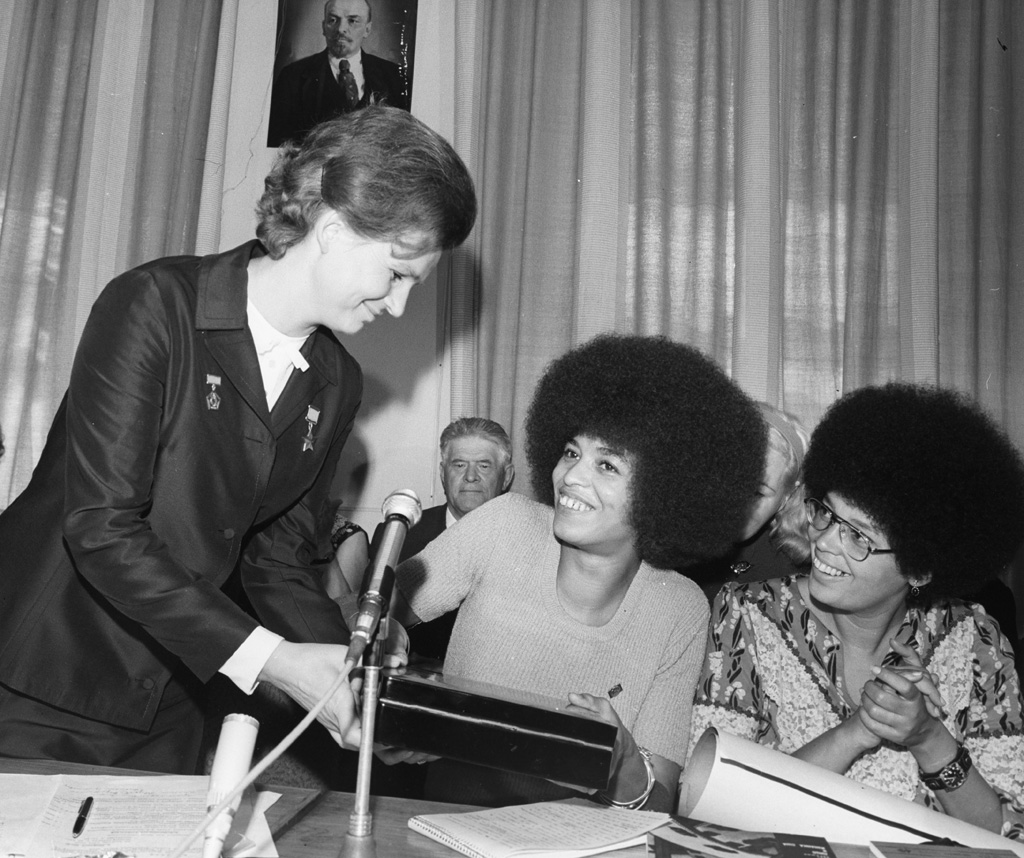
Davis and Soviet cosmonaut Valentina Tereshkova, 1972

In 1971, the CIA estimated that five percent of Soviet propaganda efforts were directed towards the Angela Davis campaign. In August 1972, Davis visited the Soviet Union at the invitation of the Central Committee. During her tour of the Soviet Union and other socialist states, Davis praised the Soviet Union for eradicating racism, and spoke favorably of Soviet childhood. Her statements and conduct during the tour disappointed some Soviet dissidents who had hoped she would support political prisoners.

On May 1, 1979, she was awarded the Lenin Peace Prize from the Soviet Union. She visited Moscow later that month to accept the prize, where she praised "the glorious name" of Vladimir Lenin and the "great October Revolution".

=== East Germany ===
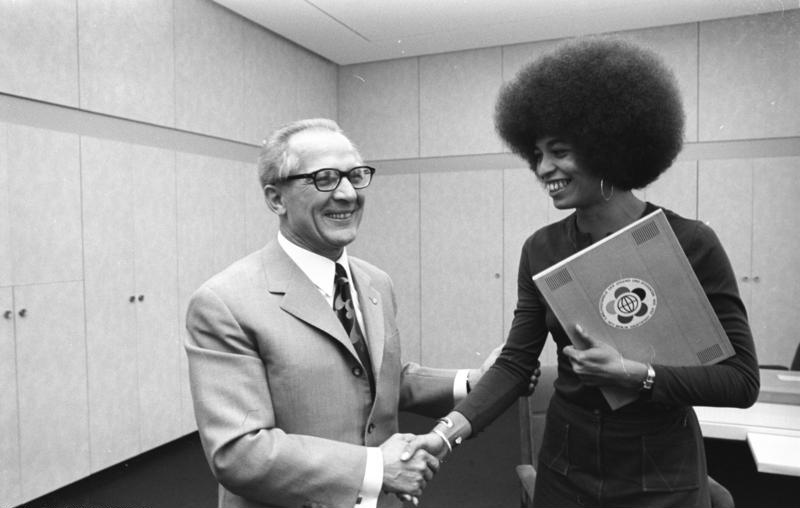
Davis and Erich Honecker in the GDR, 1972

The East German government organized an extensive campaign on behalf of Davis. In September 1972, Davis visited East Germany, where she met the state's leader Erich Honecker, received an honorary degree from the University of Leipzig and the Star of People's Friendship from Walter Ulbricht. On September 11 in East Berlin she delivered a speech, "Not Only My Victory", praising the GDR and USSR and denouncing American racism.

She visited the Berlin Wall, where she laid flowers at the memorial for Reinhold Huhn, an East German guard who had been killed by a man who was trying to escape with his family across the border in 1962. Davis said, "We mourn the deaths of the border guards who sacrificed their lives for the protection of their socialist homeland" and "When we return to the USA, we shall undertake to tell our people the truth about the true function of this border." In 1973, she returned to East Berlin, leading the U.S. delegation to the 10th World Festival of Youth and Students.

On her 1972 tour, Davis also visited Bulgaria, Czechoslovakia, and Chile.

=== Jonestown and Peoples Temple ===
In the mid-1970s, Jim Jones, who developed the cult Peoples Temple, initiated friendships with progressive leaders in the San Francisco area including Dennis Banks of the American Indian Movement and Davis. On September 10, 1977, 14 months before the Temple's mass murder-suicide, Davis spoke via amateur radio telephone "patch" to members of his Peoples Temple who were living in Jonestown in Guyana. In her statement during the "Six Day Siege", she expressed support for the Peoples Temple's anti-racism efforts and she also told Temple members that there was a conspiracy against them. She said, "When you are attacked, it is because of your progressive stand, and we feel that it is directly an attack against us as well." On February 28, 1978, Davis wrote to President Jimmy Carter, asking him not to assist in efforts to retrieve a child from Jonestown. Her letter called Jones "a humanitarian in the broadest sense of the word".

=== Aleksandr Solzhenitsyn and political prisoners in socialist states ===
In 1975, Soviet dissident and Nobel laureate Aleksandr Solzhenitsyn argued in a speech before an AFL–CIO meeting in New York City that Davis was derelict in having failed to support prisoners in various socialist countries around the world, given her strong opposition to the U.S. prison system. In 1972, Jiří Pelikán wrote an open letter in which he asked her to support Czechoslovak prisoners. According to Solzhenitsyn, Davis, in response to concerns about Czechoslovak prisoners being "persecuted by the state", had said: "They deserve what they get. Let them remain in prison." Davis's close associate Charlene Mitchell, claiming to speak on Davis's behalf, dismissed the Czechoslovak arguments and characterized emigration from socialist to capitalist countries as a "retrograde step." Davis remained largely unsympathetic to the struggles of dissidents in socialist states until the final years of the Soviet Union, while many of those dissidents likewise became skeptical of her advocacy for racial justice in the United States.

== Later academic career ==
Davis was a lecturer at the Claremont Black Studies Center at the Claremont Colleges in 1975. Attendance at the course she taught was limited to 26 students out of the more than 5,000 on campus, and she was forced to teach in secret because alumni benefactors did not want her to indoctrinate the general student population with Communist thought. College trustees made arrangements to minimize her appearance on campus, limiting her seminars to Friday evenings and Saturdays, "when campus activity is low".

Her classes moved from one classroom to another and the students were sworn to secrecy. Much of this secrecy continued throughout Davis's brief time teaching at the colleges. In 2020 it was announced that Davis would be the Ena H. Thompson Distinguished Lecturer in Pomona College's history department, welcoming her back after 45 years.

Davis taught a women's studies course at the San Francisco Art Institute in 1978 and was a professor of ethnic studies at the San Francisco State University from at least 1980 to 1984; she taught political science courses there until 1990. She was a professor in the History of Consciousness and the Feminist Studies departments at the University of California, Santa Cruz, and Rutgers University from 1991 to 2008. Since then, she has been a distinguished professor emerita.

Davis was a distinguished visiting professor at Syracuse University in the spring of 1992 and October 2010, and was the Randolph Visiting Distinguished Professor of philosophy at Vassar College in 1995.

In 2014, Davis returned to UCLA as a regents' lecturer. She delivered a public lecture on May 8 in Royce Hall, where she had given her first lecture 45 years earlier.

In 2016, Davis was awarded an honorary Doctor of Humane Letters in Healing and Social Justice from the California Institute of Integral Studies in San Francisco.

In 2025, Davis was awarded an Honorary Doctorate in Letters from the University of Cambridge. Davis was also honored in 2025 with the José Muñoz Award given by CLAGS (The Center for LGBTQ Studies) at the CUNY Graduate Center. The award honors an LGBTQ community leader or activist for their advocacy.

== Political activism and speeches ==
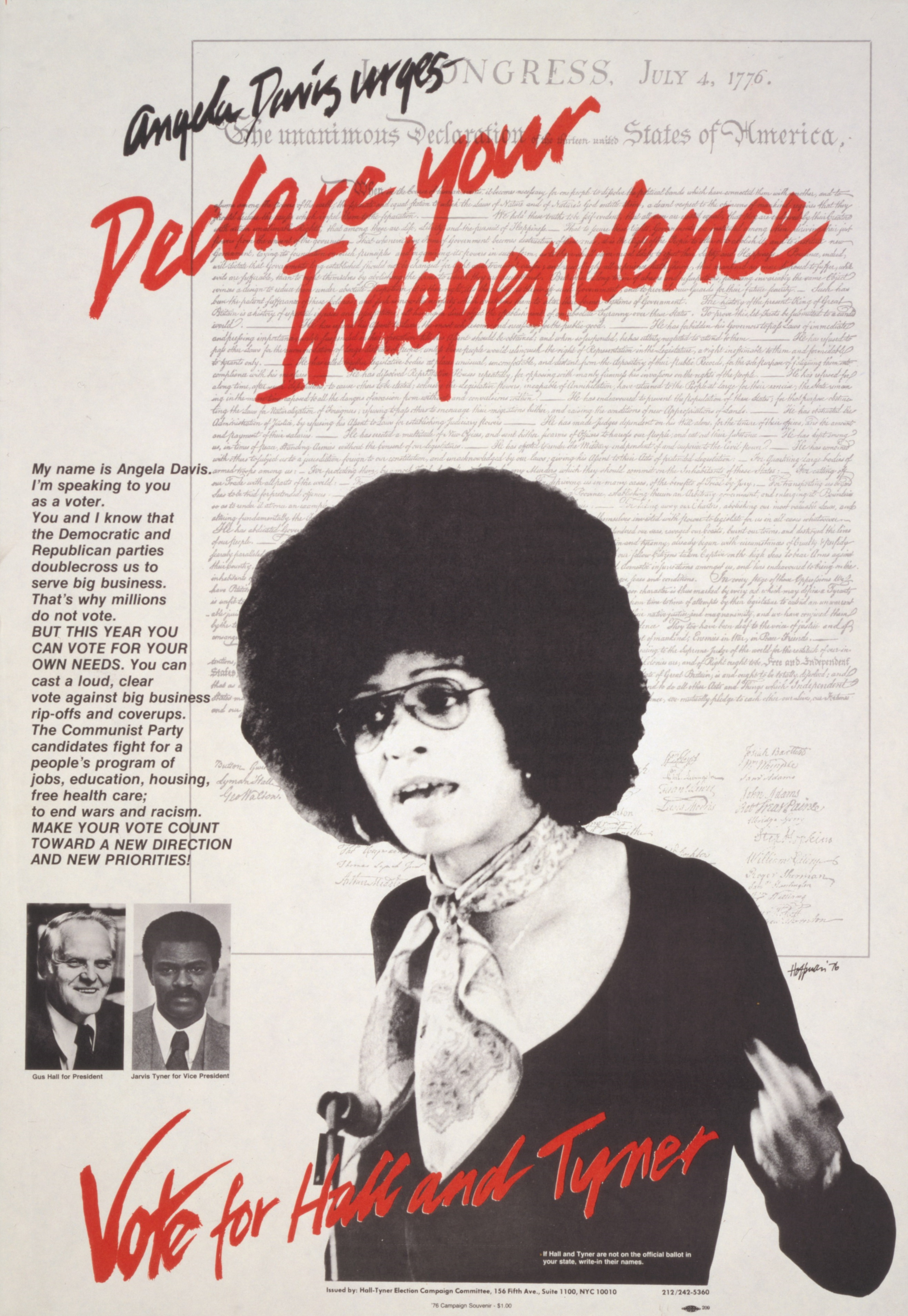
A Communist Party USA campaign poster featuring Davis, 1976

Davis accepted the Communist Party USA's nomination for vice president, as Gus Hall's running mate, in 1980 and in 1984. They received less than 0.02% of the vote in 1980. She left the party in 1991, founding the Committees of Correspondence for Democracy and Socialism. Her group broke from the Communist Party USA because of the latter's support of the 1991 Soviet coup d'état attempt after the fall of the Soviet Union and tearing down of the Berlin Wall. Davis said that she and others who had "circulated a petition about the need for democratization of the structures of governance of the party" were not allowed to run for national office and thus "in a sense ... invited to leave". In 2014, she said she continues to have a relationship with the CPUSA but has not rejoined. In the 2020 presidential election, Davis supported the Democratic nominee, Joe Biden.

Davis is a major figure in the prison abolition movement. She has called the United States prison system the "prison–industrial complex" and was one of the founders of Critical Resistance, a national grassroots organization dedicated to building a movement to abolish the prison system. In recent works, she has argued that the US prison system resembles a new form of slavery, pointing to the disproportionate share of the African-American population who were incarcerated. Davis advocates focusing social efforts on education and building "engaged communities" to solve various social problems now handled through state punishment.

As early as 1969, Davis began public speaking engagements. She expressed her opposition to the Vietnam War, racism, sexism, and the prison–industrial complex, and her support of gay rights and other social justice movements. In 1969, she blamed imperialism for the troubles oppressed populations suffer:

We are facing a common enemy and that enemy is Yankee Imperialism, which is killing us both here and abroad. Now I think anyone who would try to separate those struggles, anyone who would say that in order to consolidate an anti-war movement, we have to leave all of these other outlying issues out of the picture, is playing right into the hands of the enemy.

She has continued lecturing throughout her career, including at numerous universities.

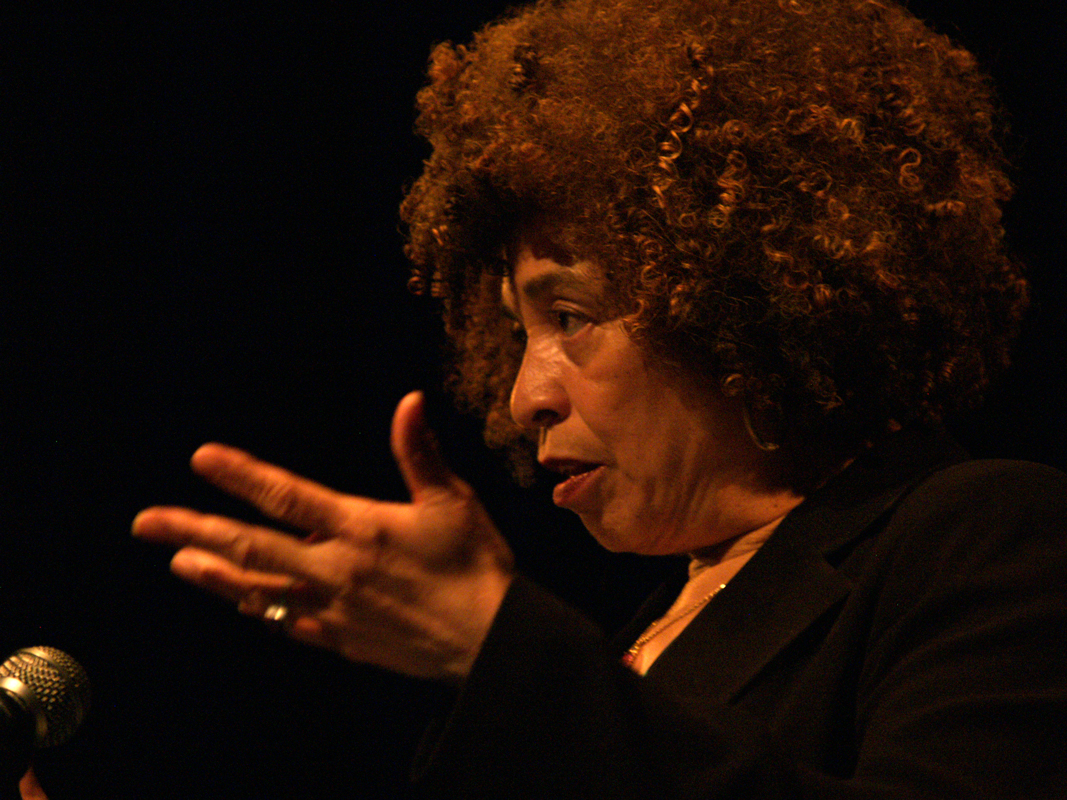
Davis at the University of Alberta in 2006

In 2001, she publicly spoke against the war on terror following the 9/11 attacks, continued to criticize the prison–industrial complex, and discussed the broken immigration system. She said that to solve social justice issues, people must "hone their critical skills, develop them and implement them". Later, in the aftermath of Hurricane Katrina in 2005, she declared that the "horrendous situation in New Orleans" was due to the country's structural racism, capitalism, and imperialism. Davis opposed the 1995 Million Man March, arguing that the exclusion of women from this event promoted male chauvinism. She said that Louis Farrakhan and other organizers appeared to prefer that women take subordinate roles in society. Together with Kimberlé Crenshaw and others, she formed the African American Agenda 2000, an alliance of black feminists.

Davis has continued to oppose the death penalty. In 2003, she lectured at Agnes Scott College, a liberal arts women's college in Decatur, Georgia, on prison reform, minority issues, and the ills of the criminal justice system. On October 31, 2011, Davis spoke at the Philadelphia and Washington Square Occupy Wall Street assemblies. Due to restrictions on electronic amplification, her words were human microphoned. In 2012, Davis was awarded the 2011 Blue Planet Award, an award given for contributions to humanity and the planet.

At the 27th Empowering Women of Color Conference in 2012, Davis said she was a vegan. She has called for the release of Rasmea Odeh, associate director at the Arab American Action Network, who was convicted of immigration fraud in relation to her hiding of a previous murder conviction.

Davis supports the Boycott, Divestment and Sanctions campaign against Israel.

Davis was an honorary co-chair of the January 21, 2017, Women's March on Washington, which occurred the day after President Donald Trump's inauguration. The organizers' decision to make her a speaker was criticized from the right by Humberto Fontova and the National Review. Libertarian journalist Cathy Young wrote that Davis's "long record of support for political violence in the United States and the worst of human rights abusers abroad" undermined the march.

On October 16, 2018, Dalhousie University in Halifax, Nova Scotia, presented Davis with an honorary Doctor of Laws degree.

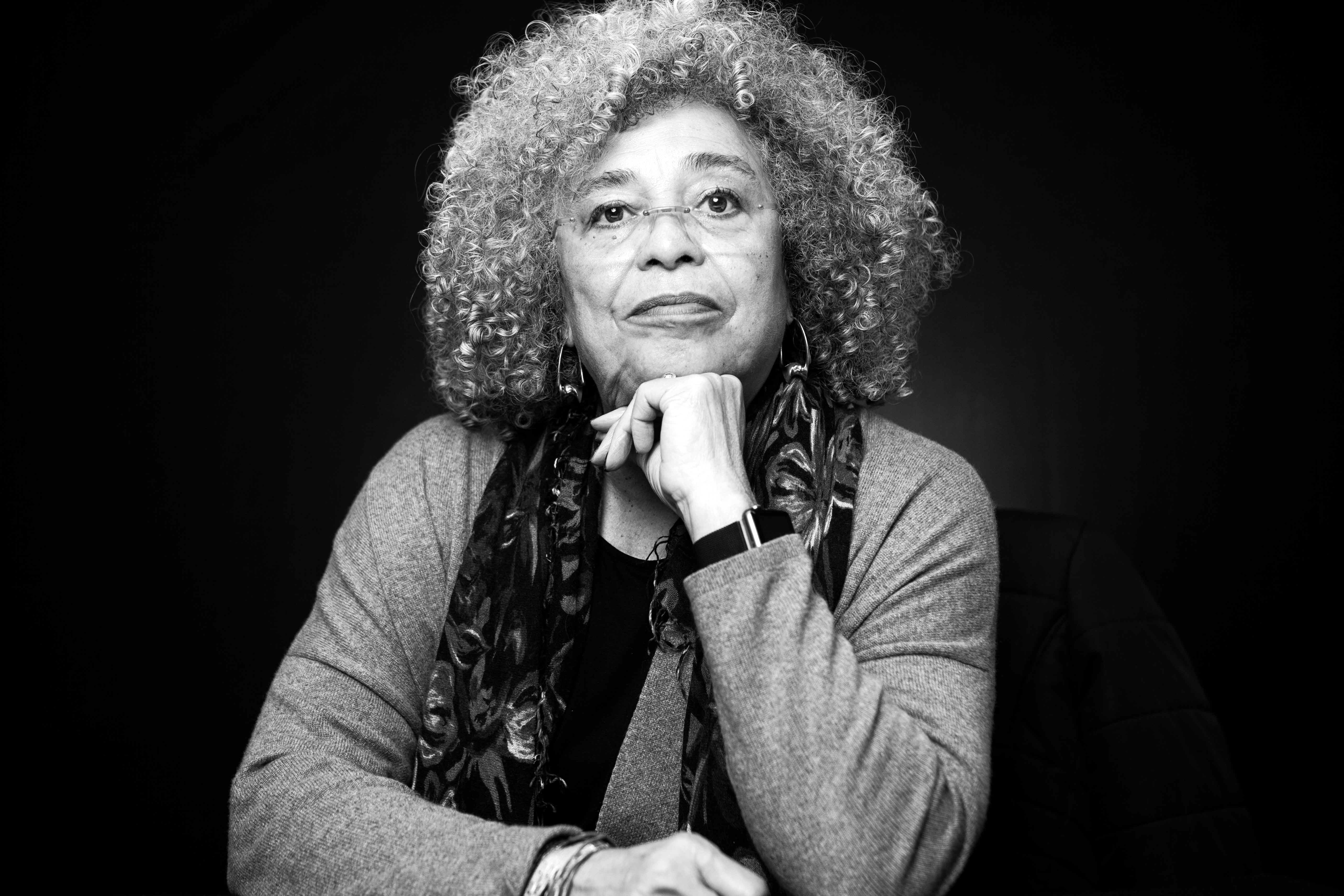
Davis in 2019

On January 7, 2019, the Birmingham Civil Rights Institute (BCRI) rescinded Davis's Fred Shuttlesworth Human Rights Award, saying she "does not meet all of the criteria". Birmingham Mayor Randall Woodfin and others cited criticism of Davis's vocal support for Palestinian rights and the movement to boycott Israel. Davis said her loss of the award was "not primarily an attack against me but rather against the very spirit of the indivisibility of justice". On January 25, the BCRI reversed its decision and issued a public apology, stating that there should have been more public consultation.

In November 2019, along with other public figures, Davis signed a letter supporting Labour Party leader Jeremy Corbyn describing him as "a beacon of hope in the struggle against emergent far-right nationalism, xenophobia, and racism in much of the democratic world", and endorsed him in the 2019 UK general election.

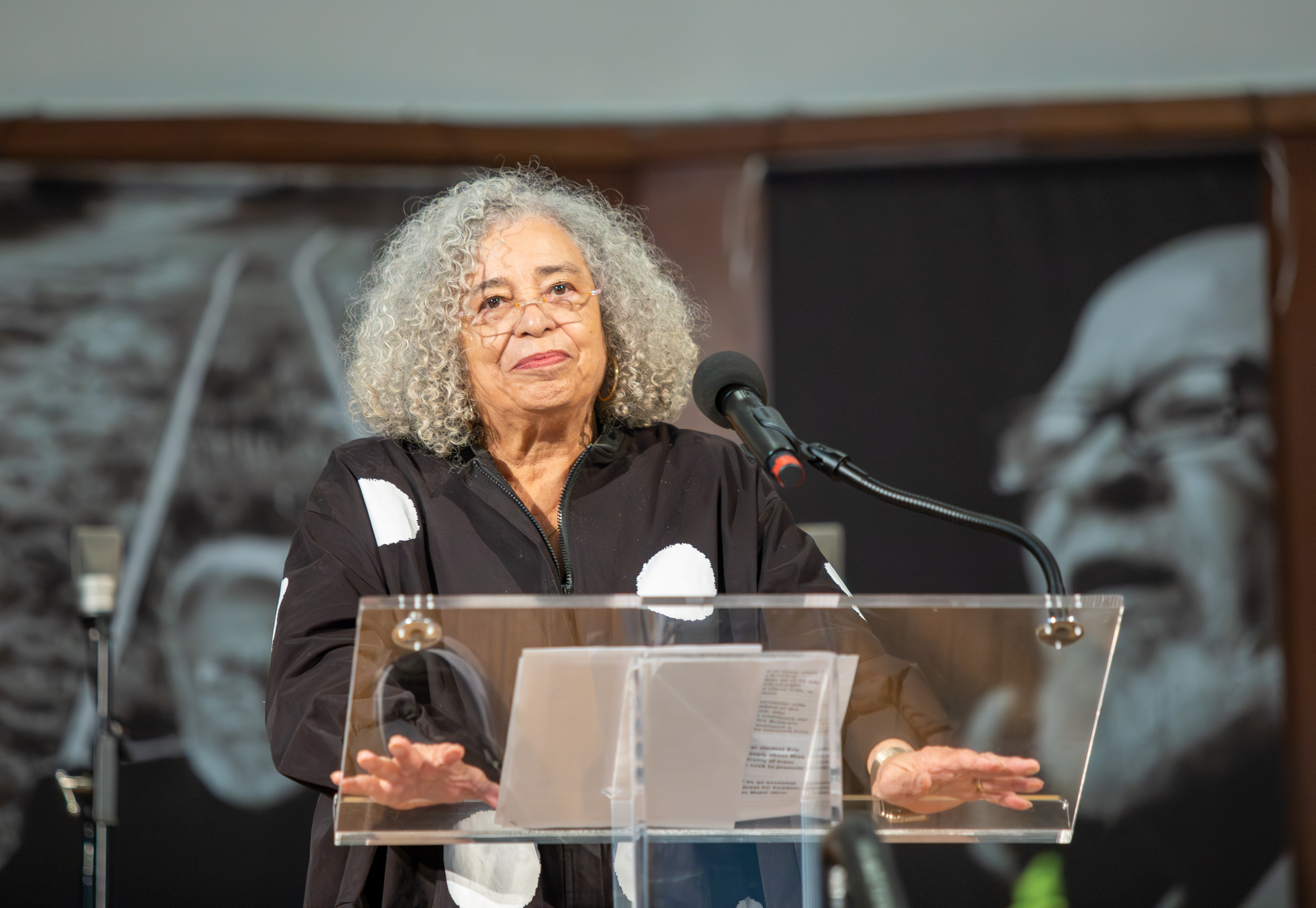
Davis speaks at a memorial for Miss Major Griffin-Gracy at Glide Memorial Church, December 2025.

On January 20, 2020, Davis gave the Memorial Keynote Address at the University of Michigan's MLK Symposium.

Davis was elected as a member of the American Academy of Arts and Sciences in 2021.

In recent years, Davis's work has reflected her concern over the incarceration of poverty-stricken and marginalized groups. In line with this, in December 2020, it was reported that Davis entered into a collaboration with Renowned LA fashion label to create clothing inspired by black activists called "Heroes of Blackness", where a beneficiary of the fashion line is Underground Grit, a prison reform group.

== Personal life ==
From 1980 to 1983, Davis was married to Hilton Braithwaite. In 1997, she came out as a lesbian in an interview with Out magazine. By 2020, Davis was living with her partner, the academic Gina Dent, a fellow humanities scholar and intersectional feminist researcher at UC Santa Cruz. Together, they have advocated the abolition of police and prisons, and championed black liberation and Palestinian solidarity.

In a 2023 episode of the PBS series Finding Your Roots, Henry Louis Gates revealed to Davis that she is a descendant of William Brewster, a passenger on the Mayflower. Another ancestor revealed in the episode was Alabama politician John A. Darden, who is Davis's grandfather. In another episode titled Secret Lives it is revealed that Davis is related to Niecy Nash.

== Representation in other media ==
- The first song released in support of Davis was "Angela" (1971), by Italian singer-songwriter and musician Virgilio Savona with his group Quartetto Cetra. He received some anonymous threats.
- In 1972, German singer-songwriter and political activist Franz Josef Degenhardt published the song "Angela Davis", the opener to his sixth studio album Mutter Mathilde.
- The Rolling Stones song "Sweet Black Angel", recorded in 1970 and released on their album Exile on Main Street (1972), is dedicated to Davis. It is one of the band's few overtly political releases. Its lines include: "She's a sweet black angel, not a gun-toting teacher, not a Red-lovin' schoolmarm / Ain't someone gonna free her, a free de sweet black slave, free de sweet black slave".
- John Lennon and Yoko Ono released their song "Angela" on the album Some Time in New York City (1972) in support of Davis, and a small photo of her appears on the album's cover at the bottom left.
- The jazz musician Todd Cochran, also known as Bayete, recorded his song "Free Angela (Thoughts...and all I've got to say)" in 1972.
- Tribe Records co-founder Phil Ranelin released a song dedicated to Davis, "Angela's Dilemma", on Message From the Tribe (1972), a spiritual jazz collectible.
- In 2019, Julie Dash, who is credited as the first black female director to have a theatrical release of a film (Daughters of the Dust) in the US, announced that she would be directing a film based on Davis's life, from a screenplay by Brian Tucker.

=== References in other venues ===
On January 28, 1972, Garrett Brock Trapnell hijacked TWA Flight 2. One of his demands was Davis's release.

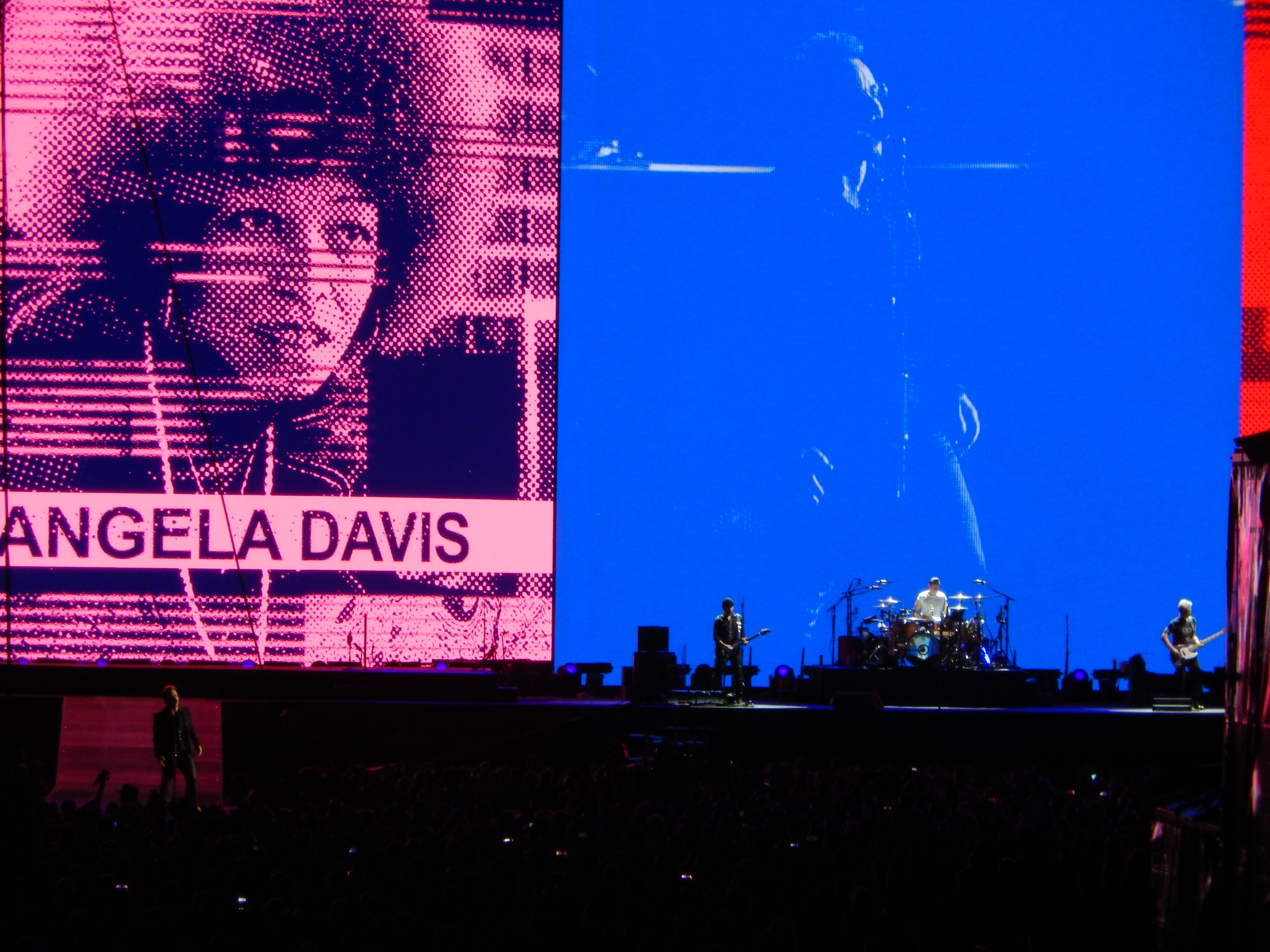
U2's concert in Soldier Field, Chicago, 2017

In Renato Guttuso's painting The Funerals of Togliatti (1972), Davis is depicted, among other figures of communism, in the left framework, near the author's self-portrait, Elio Vittorini, and Jean-Paul Sartre.

In 1971, black playwright Elvie Moore wrote the play Angela is Happening, depicting Davis on trial with figures such as Frederick Douglass, Malcolm X, and H. Rap Brown as eyewitnesses proclaiming her innocence. The play was performed at the Inner City Cultural Center and at UCLA, with Pat Ballard as Davis. The documentary Angela Davis: Portrait of a Revolutionary (1972) was directed by UCLA Film School student Yolande du Luart. It follows Davis from 1969 to 1970, documenting her dismissal from UCLA. The film wrapped shooting before the Marin County incident.

In the movie Network (1976), Marlene Warfield's character Laureen Hobbs appears to be modeled on Davis.

Also in 2018, a cotton T-shirt with Davis's face on it was featured in Prada's 2018 collection.

A mural featuring Davis was painted by Italian street artist Jorit Agoch in the Scampia neighborhood of Naples in 2019.

Also in 2019, Time created 89 new covers to celebrate women of the year starting from 1920; it chose Davis for 1971.

Ms. Davis by Amazing Améziane and Sybille Titeux de la Croix is a graphic biography focusing on Davis's early years and trial. It was published in French in 2020 and in English in 2023.

The Angela Davis mural, painted by San Jose artist Ian S. Young, was unveiled at the African American Community Service Agency (AACSA) in San Jose, California, on March 18, 2022. Angela Davis participated in the unveiling.

In 2026, Mikel Urdangarin, illustrator Usue Egia, and Ainhoa Olaso, published a graphic novel in Basque. The book features fictional encounters between Angela Davis and Basque philosopher Joxe Azurmendi, in which they discuss a wide range of issues.

== Books written ==
- If They Come in the Morning: Voices of Resistance (New York: Third Press, 1971), ISBN 0-893-88022-1.
- Angela Davis: An Autobiography, Random House (1974), ISBN 0-394-48978-0.
- Joan Little: The Dialectics of Rape (New York: Lang Communications, 1975)
- Women, Race and Class, Random House (1981), ISBN 0-394-71351-6.
- Women, Culture & Politics, Vintage (1990), ISBN 0-679-72487-7. The essay "Let Us All Rise Together: Radical Perspectives on Empowerment for Afro-American Women" (an address to the National Women's Studies Conference at Spelman College, June 25, 1987) is included in Daughters of Africa (1992), edited by Margaret Busby, pp. 570–77.
- The Angela Y. Davis Reader (ed. Joy James), Wiley-Blackwell (1998), ISBN 0-631-20361-3.
- Blues Legacies and Black Feminism: Gertrude "Ma" Rainey, Bessie Smith, and Billie Holiday, Pantheon Books (1998), ISBN 0-679-77126-3.
- Are Prisons Obsolete? , Seven Stories Press (2003), ISBN 1-58322-581-1.
- Abolition Democracy: Beyond Prisons, Torture, and Empire, Seven Stories Press (2005), ISBN 1-58322-695-8.
- The Meaning of Freedom: And Other Difficult Dialogues (City Lights, 2012), ISBN 978-0872865808.
- Freedom Is a Constant Struggle: Ferguson, Palestine, and the Foundations of a Movement, Haymarket Books (2015), ISBN 978-1-60846-564-4.
- Herbert Marcuse, Philosopher of Utopia: A Graphic Biography (foreword, City Lights, 2019), ISBN 9780872867857.

== Interviews and appearances ==
- 1971
  - An Interview with Angela Davis. Cassette. Radio Free People, New York, 1971.
  - Myerson, M. "Angela Davis in Prison". Ramparts, March 1971: 20–21.
  - Seigner, Art. Angela Davis: Soul and Soledad. Phonodisc. Flying Dutchman, New York, 1971.
  - Walker, Joe. Angela Davis Speaks. Phonodisc. Folkways Records, New York, 1971.
- 1972–1985
  - Black Journal; 67; "Interview with Angela Davis", 1972-06-20, WNET. Angela Davis makes her first national television appearance in an exclusive interview with host Tony Brown, following her recent acquittal of charges related to the San Rafael courtroom shootout.
  - Jet, "Angela Davis Talks about her Future and her Freedom", July 27, 1972: 54–57.
  - Davis, Angela Y. I Am a Black Revolutionary Woman (1971). Phonodisc. Folkways, New York, 1977.
  - Phillips, Esther. Angela Davis Interviews Esther Phillips. Cassette. Pacifica Tape Library, Los Angeles, 1977.
  - Cudjoe, Selwyn. In Conversation with Angela Davis. Videocassette. ETV Center, Cornell University, Ithaca, 1985. 21-minute interview.
- 1991–1997
  - A Place of Rage Online. Directed by Pratibha Parmar, Kali Films, season-01 1991, vimeo.com/ondemand/aplaceofrage.
  - Davis, Angela Y. "Women on the Move: Travel Themes in Ma Rainey's Blues", in Borders/diasporas. Sound Recording. University of California, Santa Cruz: Center for Cultural Studies, Santa Cruz, 1992.
  - Davis, Angela Y. Black Is... Black Ain't. Documentary film. Independent Television Service (ITVS), 1994.
  - Interview Angela Davis (Public Broadcasting Service, Spring 1997)
- 2000–2002
  - Davis, Angela Y. The Prison Industrial Complex and its Impact on Communities of Color. Videocassette. University of Wisconsin – Madison, Madison, WI, 2000.
  - Barsamian, D. "Angela Davis: African American Activist on Prison-Industrial Complex". Progressive 65.2 (2001): 33–38.
  - "September 11 America: an Interview with Angela Davis". Policing the National Body: Sex, Race, and Criminalization. Cambridge, Ma. : South End Press, 2002.
- 2010–2016
  - Mountains That Take Wing: Angela Davis & Yuri Kochiyama – A Conversation on Life, Struggles & Liberation, documentary film released 2010.
  - The Black Power Mixtape 1967–1975, a documentary film prominently featuring Davis in a number of rarely seen Swedish interviews, was released in 2011.
  - "Feminism and Abolition: Theories and Practices for the 21st Century", University of Chicago, 2013.
  - "Activist Professor Angela Davis" episode of Woman's Hour, BBC Radio 4, December 3, 2014.
  - Criminal Queers, a fictional DIY film examining the relationship between the LGBT community and the criminal justice system, was released in 2015.
  - 13th, a 2016 documentary film directed by Ava DuVernay, about the 13th Amendment and history of the civil rights movement, in which Davis features.
  - Visions of Abolition: From Critical Resistance to A New Way of Life, released 2011; updated in 2021.
- 2025
  - A Conversation with Dr. Angela Davis. Guest speaker/appearance at the University of California, Santa Barbara, to ask and answer questions surrounding today's government and social dynamics. February 26, 2025.

== Archives ==
- The National United Committee to Free Angela Davis collection is at the Main Library at Stanford University, Palo Alto, California (A collection of thousands of letters received by the committee and Davis from people in the US and other countries.)
- The complete transcript of her trial, including all appeals and legal memoranda, has been preserved in the Meiklejohn Civil Liberties Library in Berkeley, California.
- Davis's papers are archived at the Schlesinger Library at the Radcliffe Institute for Advanced Study in Cambridge, Massachusetts.
- Records including correspondence, statements, clippings and other documents about Davis's dismissal from the University of California, Los Angeles due to her political affiliation with the Communist Party are archived at UCLA.

== See also ==
- Africana philosophy
- Billy Strachan, headed the London branch of the Angela Davis Defence Committee

Party political offices
| Preceded by Jarvis Tyner | Communist Party USA vice presidential candidate 1980 (lost), 1984 (lost) | Succeeded by — |
