= Cinema United =

American film exhibition trade organization

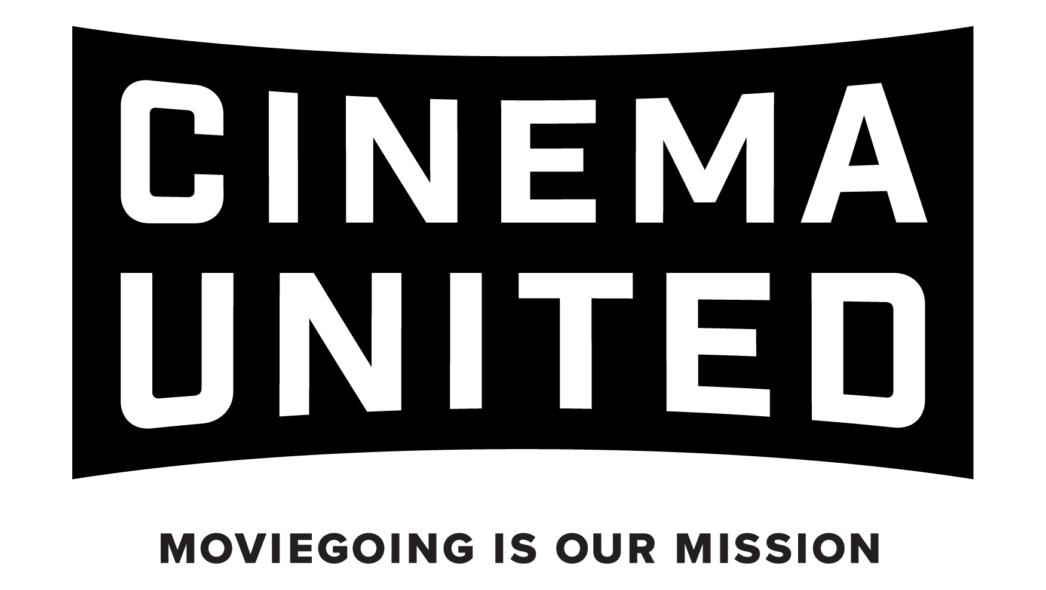
- Logo introduced in 2025
- Abbreviation: NATO (1965–2025)
- Formation: 1965; 61 years ago (as National Association of Theatre Owners); March 18, 2025; 19 months ago (current name)
- Merger of: Theater Owners of America; Allied States Association of Motion Picture Exhibitors
- Type: Trade organization
- Headquarters: Washington, D.C.
- Location: United States
- Region served: Worldwide
- Services: CinemaCon
- Fields: Movie theaters; Exhibition; Trade shows
- Official language: English
- President and CEO: Michael O'Leary
- Board of directors: 20 members
- Key people: Bob Bagby, Chairman; Mike Bowers, Vice chairman; Joe Masher; Bo Chambliss
- Publication: Boxoffice Pro
- Website: cinemaunited.org
- Formerly called: National Association of Theatre Owners (1965–2025)

Cinema United, formerly known as the National Association of Theatre Owners (NATO), is an American trade organization whose members are the owners of movie theaters. Most of the operators of worldwide major theater chains are members, as are hundreds of independent theater operators; collectively, they account for the operation of over 35,000 motion picture screens in all 50 U.S. states and over 33,000 screens in 100 other countries.

NATO was founded in 1965 by the merger of the largest movie theater trade organizations; the Theater Owners of America and the Allied States Association of Motion Picture Exhibitors. The long-running official magazine of NATO is Boxoffice (now Boxoffice Pro); between 2001 and 2007, they also published In Focus. On March 18, 2025, NATO rebranded as Cinema United, to honor and support movie theaters.

== History ==
=== Early history ===
The original National Association of Theatre Owners logo

As the motion picture industry became larger, movie production companies began consolidating and controlling distribution. The largest producer, Famous Players–Lasky, joined and later merged with the largest distributor, Paramount (eventually becoming Paramount Pictures), and together they began block-booking in 1917, forcing theaters to buy mediocre films to get the good ones. Theaters banded together to bargain for better pricing, with 26 of the largest combining into First National Exhibitors Circuit—which went on to become a producer and distributor in its own right, before being bought by Warner Bros. By 1921, Paramount already owned 300 theaters, and other producers were catching up. Studios soon contracted with each other to keep first-runs inside the affiliated network, using this access to coerce independents into selling out.

In 1921, the first predecessor of NATO was founded, the largely affiliated Motion Picture Theater Owners of America (MPTOA), soon followed by the independent Allied States Association of Motion Picture Exhibitors (Allied), Unaffiliated Independent Motion Picture Exhibitors of America, National Independent Theatre Exhibitors, and more, to demand better pricing and access to first-runs. Unlike the others, the MPTOA embraced affiliated theaters, and soon became the largest organization.

During World War II, many theaters joined the new War Activities Committee, after the war becoming the Theatre Activities Committee and soon American Theatre Association (ATA), which strongly supported United States v. Paramount Pictures, Inc., the antitrust case against all of the major studios. A plan to merge with MPTOA, which strongly supported the studios, ran into friction, with many affiliated theaters leaving the ATA over its stance; conversely Allied, the largest purely-independent group, refused to join over the presence of affiliates. The merger went ahead in 1947, minus affiliates of Loews, RKO, and Warner Bros., and they became the Theater Owners of America (TOA) with about 10,000 theaters.

After divestiture in the fallout of the 1948 Paramount decision, many formerly-affiliated theaters ended up joining either TOA or Allied. During the post-war period, theater revenue collapsed as television became widespread, even as film rental became more expensive, and thousands of theaters closed, particularly in city centers hard hit by suburban flight. Finally, in 1966 TOA and Allied merged into the National Association of Theatre Owners, largely based on TOA's structure but headed by Marshall Fine, former Allied chairman.

The 1970s were difficult for NATO; although the blockbuster The Godfather revitalized theater-going and revenue, in 1975 a new National Independent Theatre Exhibitors (NITE) came together to challenge NATO, eventually numbering almost a thousand theaters, and governance reforms were pushed by members as well. When the reforms stalled, the entire California and Illinois chapters pulled out in 1977, along with many small chains around the nation. After 1980, many of the requested reforms were finally implemented, including a full-time president and a full-time lobbyist in Washington, as well as moving its headquarters from New York to Los Angeles; by the end of the decade, NITE had folded back into NATO, leaving only one dominant organization.

The 1980s saw a relaxation of antitrust regulation and subsequent purchasing of many chains by distributors and large conglomerates, including 120 theaters by Paramount and Warner; by the end of the decade, consolidation left the top 10 owners in control of 55 percent of the industry. In the 1990s, theater growth exploded, and by 1999, movie screens peaked at 36,448, the vast majority of which were affiliated with NATO.

=== Rebranding ===
In March 2025, the National Association of Theatre Owners announced that it had rebranded to Cinema United and a new slogan, "Moviegoing is Our Mission", as part of an effort to honor and support movie theaters by emphasizing audiences viewing movies theatrically. The new name also avoids confusion with the North Atlantic Treaty Organization, the military alliance known as NATO.

== Conventions ==
As ShoWest, the convention was formerly one of four major worldwide annual events owned by the Film Group unit of Nielsen Business Media before being sold in 2011 to e5 Global Media and operated exclusively by NATO.

Renamed CinemaCon in 2011, the convention is NATO's only official convention of theater owners controlled by the organization itself. The first gathering took place in March 2011 at Caesars Palace in Las Vegas, Nevada, with the second held April 23–26, 2012, at the same venue.

CinemaCon is now a stand-alone cinematic theater industry trade exposition originally established by NATO in 2011. Usually held in Las Vegas in March.

On March 11, 2020, NATO canceled CinemaCon 2020 due to the COVID-19 pandemic.

The remaining Nielsen Media event properties include CineEurope held in Barcelona, Spain in June, CineAsia held in early December in varying locations throughout Southeast Asia, and ShowEast, held in late October or early November in the Southeastern United States, usually somewhere in the Miami-Dade area.

== ShoWest Convention Awards ==
ShoWest Convention 1976

- George Barrie – Producer of the Year Award

ShoWest Convention 1978

- George Lucas – Director of the Year Award
- Mark Hamill – Male Star of Tomorrow Award
- Henry Winkler – Male Star of the Year Award
- Robert Mitchum – Lifetime Achievement Award

ShoWest Convention 1979

- Jane Fonda – Female Star of the Year Award
- Jon Voight –Male Star of the Year Award
- Sylvester Stallone – Star of the Year Award
- Michael Douglas – Star/Producer of the Year Award

ShoWest Convention 1981

- George Hamilton – Showman of the Year Award

ShoWest Convention 1982

- Steven Spielberg – Director of the Year Award
- Frank Marshall – Producer of the Year Award
- Pia Zadora – Young Star of the Year Award
- Chuck Norris – Action Star of the Year Award
- Rich Little – Entertainer of the Year Award
- Clint Eastwood – Male Star of the Decade Award
- Lori Singer – Newcomer of the Year Award
- Sean Connery – Worldwide Star of the Year Award

ShoWest Convention 1983

- Taylor Hackford – Director of the Year Award
- Shelley Long – Female Star of Tomorrow Award
- Debra Winger – Female Star of the Year Award
- David Keith – Male Star of Tomorrow Award
- Richard Gere – Male Star of the Year Award
- Sydney Pollack – Producer of the Year Award
- Louis Gossett, Jr. – Best Supporting Actor Award

ShoWest Convention 1984

- Lori Singer – Breakthrough Performer of the Year Award
- Sylvester Stallone – Star of Stars Award
- Charlton Heston – Lifetime Achievement Award

ShoWest Convention 1985

- Kelly LeBrock – Female Star of Tomorrow Award
- Eric Stoltz – Male Star of Tomorrow Award
- Arnold Schwarzenegger – International Star of the Year Award
- Eddie Murphy – Star of the Year Award

ShoWest Convention 1986

- Roy Scheider – Career Achievement Award

ShoWest Convention 1987

- Leonard Nimoy – Director of the Year Award
- Paul Hogan – Male Star of the Year Award
- Tom Cruise – Box Office Star of the Year Award

ShoWest Convention 1988

- Bette Midler – Female Star of the Year Award
- Don Johnson – Male Star of the Year Award

ShoWest Convention 1989

- James L. Brooks – Director of the Year Award
- Carey Lowell & Talisa Soto – Female Star of Tomorrow Award
- Glenn Close – Female Star of the Year Award
- Danny DeVito – Male Star of the Year Award
- David Zucker, Jerry Zucker, Robert K. Weiss & Jim Abrahams – Comedy Filmmakers of the Year Award
- Leslie Nielsen – Male Comedy Star of the Year Award

ShoWest Convention 1990

- Tim Burton – Director of the Year Award
- Winona Ryder – Female Star of Tomorrow Award
- Anjelica Huston – Female Star of the Year Award
- Johnny Depp – Male Star of Tomorrow Award
- Jeff Bridges – Male Star of the Year Award
- Joel Silver – Producer of the Year Award

ShoWest Convention 1991

- Jerry Zucker – Director of the Year Award
- Robin Givens – Female Star of Tomorrow Award
- Julia Roberts – Female Star of the Year Award
- Richard Grieco – Male Star of Tomorrow Award
- Andy Garcia – Male Star of the Year Award
- John Hughes – Producer of the Year Award

ShoWest Convention 1992

- Lawrence Kasdan – Director of the Year Award
- Jodie Foster – Female Star of the Year Award
- Nicole Kidman – Female Star of Tomorrow Award
- Stephen Dorff – Male Star of Tomorrow Award
- Patrick Swayze – Male Star of the Year Award
- Brian Grazer – Producer of the Year Award
- John Singleton – Screenwriter of the Year Award
- John Singleton – Directorial Debut of the Year Award
- Chuck Norris – International Box Office Star of the Year Award
- Oliver Stone – Meritorious Achievement Award
- Cuba Gooding, Jr. – Newcomer of the Year Award
- Eddie Murphy – Star of the Decade Award

ShoWest Convention 1993

- Clint Eastwood – Director of the Year Award
- Juliette Lewis – Female Star of Tomorrow Award
- Whoopi Goldberg – Female Star of the Year Award
- Brad Pitt – Male Star of Tomorrow Award
- Mel Gibson – Male Star of the Year Award
- Mace Neufeld & Robert Rehme – Producer of the Year Award
- Richard Friedenberg – Screenwriter of the Year Award
- Arnold Schwarzenegger – International Star of the Decade Award
- George Kennedy – Special Award of Merit
- Jack Lemmon & Walter Matthau – Lifetime Achievement Award

ShoWest Convention 1994

- Steven Spielberg – Director of the Year Award
- Tia Carrere – Female Star of Tomorrow Award
- Michelle Pfeiffer – Female Star of the Year Award
- Chris O'Donnell – Male Star of Tomorrow Award
- Robin Williams – Male Star of the Year Award
- Arnold Kopelson – Producer of the Year Award
- Steven Zaillian – Screenwriter of the Year Award
- Elijah Wood – Young Star of the Year Award
- Harrison Ford – Box Office Star of the Century Award
- Kirk Douglas – Lifetime Achievement Award

ShoWest Convention 1995

- Robert Zemeckis – Director of the Year Award
- Julia Ormond – Female Star of Tomorrow Award
- Demi Moore – Female Star of the Year Award
- Martin Lawrence & Will Smith – Male Star of Tomorrow Award
- Tom Hanks – Male Star of the Year Award
- James Cameron – Producer of the Year Award
- Paul Attanasio – Screenwriter of the Year Award
- Mara Wilson – Young Star of the Year Award
- Jim Carrey – Comedy Star of the Year Award
- Christina Ricci – Star of the Year Award
- Faye Dunaway – Lifetime Achievement Award

ShoWest Convention 1996

- Mel Gibson – Director of the Year Award
- Cameron Diaz – Female Star of Tomorrow Award
- Sandra Bullock – Female Star of the Year Award
- Greg Kinnear – Male Star of Tomorrow Award
- John Travolta – Male Star of the Year Award
- James G. Robinson – Producer of the Year Award
- Edward Burns – Screenwriter of the Year Award
- Jonathan Taylor Thomas – Young Star of the Year Award
- John Lasseter – Outstanding Achievement Award
- Sophia Loren – Lifetime Achievement Award

ShoWest Convention 1997

- Joel Schumacher – Director of the Year Award
- Claire Danes – Female Star of Tomorrow Award
- Winona Ryder – Female Star of the Year Award
- Howie Long – Male Star of Tomorrow Award
- Denzel Washington – Male Star of the Year Award
- Arnon Milchan – Producer of the Year Award
- Albert Brooks & Monica Mcgowan Johnson – Screenwriter of the Year Award
- Alex D. Linz – Young Star of the Year Award
- The Rock – Favorite Movie of the Year Award
- Will Smith – International Box Office Achievement Award
- Cuba Gooding, Jr. – Supporting Actor of the Year Award
- Elizabeth Hurley – Supporting Actress of the Year Award
- Arnold Schwarzenegger – Humanitarian Award

ShoWest Convention 1998

- Anthony Hopkins – Actor of the Year Award
- Helen Hunt – Actress of the Year Award
- Barry Levinson – Director of the Year Award
- Minnie Driver – Female Star of Tomorrow Award
- Matt Damon – Male Star of Tomorrow Award
- Laurie MacDonald & Walter F. Parkes – Producer of the Year Award
- Ronald Bass – Screenwriter of the Year Award
- Burt Reynolds – Supporting Actor of the Year Award
- Joan Allen – Supporting Actress of the Year Award
- Jerry Bruckheimer – International Box Office Achievement Award
- Julia Roberts – International Star of the Year Award
- Susan Sarandon – Humanitarian Award

ShoWest Convention 1999

- Will Smith – Actor of the Year Award
- Meg Ryan – Actress of the Year Award
- John Madden – Director of the Year Award
- Heather Graham – Female Star of Tomorrow Award
- Giovanni Ribisi – Male Star of Tomorrow Award
- Jerry Bruckheimer – Producer of the Year Award
- Bobby Farrelly & Peter Farrelly – Screenwriter of the Year Award
- William H. Macy – Supporting Actor of the Year Award
- Catherine Zeta-Jones – Supporting Actress of the Year Award
- Tom Hanks – Box Office Star of the Decade Award
- Adam Sandler – Comedy Star of the Year Award
- Sean Connery – Lifetime Achievement Award

ShoWest Convention 2000

- Anthony Minghella – Director of the Year Award
- Hilary Swank – Female Star of Tomorrow Award
- Annette Bening – Female Star of the Year Award
- John Williams – Maestro of the Year Award
- Michael Clarke Duncan – Male Star of Tomorrow Award
- Jim Carrey – Male Star of the Year Award
- Armyan Bernstein – Producer of the Year Award
- Alan Ball – Screenwriter of the Year Award
- Ving Rhames – Supporting Actor of the Year Award
- Angelina Jolie – Supporting Actress of the Year Award
- Drew Barrymore – Comedy Star of the Year Award

ShoWest Convention 2001

- Wolfgang Petersen – Director of the Year Award
- Sandra Bullock – Female Star of the Year Award
- Ang Lee – International Filmmaker of the Year Award
- Michelle Yeoh – International Star of the Year Award
- Heath Ledger – Male Star of Tomorrow Award
- Russell Crowe – Male Star of the Year Award
- Richard D. Zanuck & David Brown – Producer of the Year Award
- William Broyles, Jr. – Screenwriter of the Year Award
- Haley Joel Osment – Supporting Actor of the Year Award
- Judi Dench – Supporting Actress of the Year Award
- Chris Rock – Comedy Star of the Year Award
- Nicolas Cage – Distinguished Decade of Achievement in Film Award

ShoWest Convention 2002

- Ron Howard – Director of the Year Award
- Naomi Watts – Female Star of Tomorrow Award
- Jennifer Lopez – Female Star of the Year Award
- Jean-Pierre Jeunet – International Filmmaker of the Year Award
- Josh Hartnett – Male Star of Tomorrow Award
- Will Smith – Male Star of the Year Award
- Douglas Wick – Producer of the Year Award
- Julian Fellowes – Screenwriter of the Year Award
- Marisa Tomei – Supporting Actress of the Year Award
- Chris Tucker – Comedy Star of the Year Award
- Nicole Kidman – Distinguished Decade of Achievement in Film Award
- Steven Spielberg – Lifetime Achievement Award

ShoWest Convention 2003

- Sam Mendes – Director of the Year Award
- Alison Lohman – Female Star of Tomorrow Award
- Diane Lane – Female Star of the Year Award
- Fernando Meirelles – International Achievement in Filmmaking Award
- LL Cool J – Male Star of Tomorrow Award
- Adam Sandler – Male Star of the Year Award
- David Heyman – Producer of the Year Award
- Antwone Fisher – Screenwriter of the Year Award
- Christopher Walken – Supporting Actor of the Year Award
- Catherine Zeta-Jones – Supporting Actress of the Year Award
- Chris Wedge – Animation Director of the Year Award
- Brian Grazer – Lifetime Achievement Award

ShoWest Convention 2004

- Jennifer Garner – Female Star of Tomorrow Award
- Halle Berry – Female Star of the Year Award
- Niki Caro – International Filmmaker of the Year Award
- Ryan Gosling – Male Star of Tomorrow Award
- Jude Law – Male Star of the Year Award
- John Davis – Producer of the Year Award
- Djimon Hounsou – Supporting Actor of the Year Award
- Andrew Stanton – Animation Director of the Year Award
- Jack Black – Comedy Star of the Year Award
- Drew Barrymore & Gwyneth Paltrow – Distinguished Decade of Achievement in Film Award
- Lawrence Gordon – Lifetime Achievement Award

ShoWest Convention 2005

- Rob Cohen – Director of the Year Award
- Jessica Biel – Female Star of Tomorrow Award
- Jennifer Aniston – Female Star of the Year Award
- Danny Boyle – International Filmmaker of the Year Award
- Hayden Christensen – Male Star of Tomorrow Award
- Matt Damon – Male Star of the Year Award
- Rachel McAdams – Supporting Actress of the Year Award
- Catalina Sandino Moreno – International Star of the Year Award
- George Lucas – Galactic Achievement Award

ShoWest Convention 2006

- M. Night Shyamalan – Director of the Year Award
- Jennifer Hudson – Female Star of Tomorrow Award
- Natalie Portman – Female Star of the Year Award
- Guillermo del Toro – International Achievement in Filmmaking Award
- Brandon Routh – Male Star of Tomorrow Award
- Hugh Jackman – Male Star of the Year Award
- Dakota Fanning – Supporting Actress of the Year Award
- Vince Vaughn – Comedy Star of the Year Award
- Laurence Fishburne – Distinguished Decade of Achievement in Film Award
- John Lasseter – Pioneer of Animation Award
- Keke Palmer – Rising Star of the Year Award

ShoWest Convention 2007

- Christopher Miller & Raman Hui – Animation Director of the Year Award
- Dane Cook – Breakout Performance of the Year Award
- Quentin Tarantino & Robert Rodriguez – Director of the Year Award
- Mark Burg & Oren Koules – Excellence in Producing Award
- Emma Roberts – Female Star of Tomorrow Award
- Kirsten Dunst – Female Star of the Year Award
- Alfonso Cuaron – International Achievement in Filmmaking Award
- Shia LaBeouf – Male Star of Tomorrow Award
- Don Cheadle – Male Star of the Year Award
- Jerry Weintraub – Producer of the Year Award
- Bruce Joel Rubin – Screenwriter of the Year Award
- Freddy Rodriguez – Supporting Actor of the Year Award
- Rosario Dawson – Supporting Actress of the Year Award
- Steve Carell – Comedy Star of the Year Award

ShoWest Convention 2008

- Helen Hunt – Breakthrough Director of the Year Award
- Marvin Levy – Career Achievement in Film Making Award
- Christopher Nolan – Director of the Year Award
- Brendan Fraser – Distinguished Decade of Achievement in Film Award
- David Mamet – Excellence in Filmmaking Award
- Abigail Breslin – Female Star of Tomorrow Award
- Anne Hathaway – Female Star of the Year Award
- Alan Ball – Groundbreaking Filmmaker of the Year Award
- Sergei Bodrov – International Achievement in Filmmaking Award
- Emile Hirsch – Male Star of Tomorrow Award
- Robert Downey, Jr. – Male Star of the Year Award
- Charles Roven – Producer of the Year Award
- Jim Sturgess, Kevin Spacey, Kate Bosworth, Laurence Fishburne, Aaron Yoo, Liza Lapira, Jacob Pitts & Josh Gad – Best Ensemble Award
- Seth Rogen – Comedy Star of the Year Award
- Sarah Jessica Parker – ShoWest Vanguard Award
- Ang Lee & James Schamus – ShoWest/NATO Freedom of Expression Award
- Robert Redford – Visionary Award

ShoWest Convention 2009

- Zac Efron – Breakthrough Performer of the Year Award
- Zack Snyder – Director of the Year Award
- Briana Evigan, Leah Pipes, Rumer Willis, Jamie Chung, Audrina Patridge & Margo Harshman – Female Star of Tomorrow Award
- Rachel McAdams – Female Star of the Year Award
- Chris Pine – Male Star of Tomorrow Award
- Dennis Quaid – Male Star of the Year Award
- Sienna Miller – Supporting Actor of the Year Award
- Patricia Clarkson – Independent Award for Excellence in Acting
- Kathryn Bigelow – Triumph Award for Outstanding Direction
- Roger Ebert – Career Achievement in Film Journalism
- Bradley Cooper – Comedy Star of the Year Award
- Michael Bay – ShoWest Vanguard Award for Excellence in Filmmaking
- Mark Christiansen – Ken Mason InterSociety Award
- Michael Caine – Lifetime Achievement Award

ShoWest Convention 2010

- Amanda Seyfried – Breakthrough Female Star of the Year Award
- Todd Phillips – Director of the Year Award
- Sarah Jessica Parker, Kim Cattrall, Kristin Davis & Cynthia Nixon – Ensemble Award
- Vanessa Anne Hudgens – Female Star of Tomorrow Award
- Katherine Heigl – Female Star of the Year Award
- Alex Pettyfer – Male Star of Tomorrow Award
- Sam Worthington – Male Star of the Year Award
- Jay Roach – Comedy Director of the Decade Award
- Zach Galifianakis – Comedy Star of the Year Award
- Jerry Bruckheimer – Lifetime Achievement Award

ShoWest Convention 2011

- Chloe Bridges & Sasha Pieterse – Breakthrough Performer of the Year Award

ShoWest Convention 2014

- Cameron Deane Stewart, Justin Deeley, Meaghan Martin, Allie Gonino, Ally Maki, Nikki Blonsky, Alex Newell, Scott Bakula, Marin Hinkle & Ana Gasteyer – Ensemble Award

== American Movie Awards ==
In 1980, NATO initiated the American Movie Awards, held at the Wilshire Theater, Beverly Hills, California, and broadcast on NBC, with the winners selected based on voting by theater patrons. Various legal difficulties prevented the awards from being presented in 1981, and the event was discontinued after the 1982 awards due to competition from other awards shows.

== CinemaCon Awards 2011 ==
- Cameron Diaz – Female Star of the Year Award
- Vin Diesel – Action Star of the Year Award
- Rosie Huntington-Whiteley – Female Star of Tomorrow Award
- Chris Hemsworth – Male Star of Tomorrow Award
- Blake Lively – Breakthrough Performer of the Year Award
- Ryan Reynolds – Male Star of the Year Award
- Harry Potter Film Franchise – Hall of Fame Award
- Helen Mirren – Career Achievement Award
- Russell Brand – Comedy Star of the Year Award
- Morgan Spurlock – Documentary Filmmaker of the Year Award
- Tyler Perry – Visionary Award
- Jason Momoa – Rising Star of 2011 Award (male)
- Julianne Hough – Rising Star of 2011 Award (female)
- Sid Ganis – Inter-Society's 2011 Ken Mason Award
- Miky Lee – Global Achievement in Exhibition Award
- Richard Fox – CinemaCon Passepartout Award
- Dick Cook – Pioneer of the Year

== CinemaCon Awards 2012 ==
- Jennifer Garner – Female Star of the Year Award
- Jeremy Renner – Male Star of the Year Award
- Dwayne Johnson – Action Star of the Year Award
- Anna Faris – Comedy Star of the Year Award
- Chloë Grace Moretz – Female Star of Tomorrow Award
- Taylor Kitsch – Male Star of Tomorrow Award
- Josh Hutcherson – Breakthrough Performer of the Year Award
- Charlize Theron – Distinguished Decade of Achievement in Film Award
- Michelle Pfeiffer – Cinema Icon Award
- Sylvester Stallone – Career Achievement Award
- Judd Apatow – Award of Excellence in Filmmaking
- Timur Bekmambetov – International Filmmaker of the Year Award
- Universal Pictures International's Jack Ledwith – Passepartout Award
- Ted Pedas – NATO Marquee Award
- Delfin Fernandez – International Achievement in Exhibition Award
- Jeffrey Katzenberg – Pioneer of the Year

== National Cinema Day ==
Cinema Foundation, the nonprofit arm of NATO, announced National Cinema Day for September 3, 2022, in which over 3,000 theaters would offer showings for US$3. National Cinema Day occurred again on August 27, 2023, in which 3,000 theaters offered showings for US$4.

=== International Dates ===
- 2022: September 3 – £3
- 2023: September 2 – £3
- 2024: August 31 – £4
- 2026: September 5–6 – £4 (two-day event known as "National Cinema Weekend")

== Average U.S. movie ticket price ==
NATO provides an annual average movie ticket price, in April, each year. In 2019, at $9.16, this stopped, due to Covid closures. In 2022, box office receipts were 66 percent of 2019, yet attendance levels were 55 percent of 2019. In 2022, IndieWire concluded that average movie ticket prices rose, at least 20 percent, to $11, based on the 2022 second-quarter AMC Theatres earnings call which stated a 22 percent ticket revenue rise compared to the 2019 second-quarter.

== See also ==
- Nielsen Business Media (Nielsen Media Film Group)
