= Women, Race and Class =

1981 book by Angela Davis

- First edition
- Author: Angela Davis
- Genre: History
- Publisher: Random House
- Publication date: 1981
- Publication place: United States
- Pages: 271

Women, Race and Class is a 1981 book by the American academic and author Angela Davis. It contains Marxist feminist analysis of gender, race and class. The third book written by Davis, it covers U.S. history from the slave trade and abolitionism movements to the women's liberation movements that began in the 1960s.

== Background ==
Angela Davis was born in Alabama, United States, in 1944, as the oldest of four children in a black middle-class family. She was an activist from an early age, inspired by female parental figures who opposed the Jim Crow laws, and became involved with socialist groups and Marxism–Leninism. She attended Brandeis University, majoring in French. She later studied under the philosopher Herbert Marcuse and joined the Black Panther Party and Communist Party USA in the late 1960s. After completing a master's degree, she began teaching philosophy at the University of California, Los Angeles. She was repeatedly fired over her political beliefs and jailed for two years for purchasing guns later used by revolutionary Jonathan P. Jackson, being released in 1972 and later acquitted.

The 1981 work Women, Race and Class was Davis's third book. It followed If They Come in the Morning: Voices of Resistance (1971), a collection of writings edited by Davis, including contributions in which she discusses her experiences in prison, and Angela Davis: An Autobiography (1974), which was about the civil rights movement and its impact on her ideology. Both Angela Davis and Women, Race and Class were edited by Toni Morrison during her tenure as senior editor at Random House.

== Synopsis ==
Women, Race and Class is a collection of 13 essays about the American women's liberation movement from the 1960s up to the point at which the book was published, and also about slavery in the United States. She applies Marxist analysis to the relation of class and race to capitalism in America. Davis criticizes that the women's liberation movement has been run by and for white middle-class women, to the exclusion of black women, other women of color and other social classes. She makes similar comments about women's suffrage. Davis comments on the participation of white women in the abolitionism movement. The book also describes the woman's club movement.

Davis explores the economic role of black women slaves. She writes that black women under slavery had similar struggles to black men, both groups sharing the task of manual labor and participating in abolitionist activism. However, women were also expected to perform the household labor, similar to women of other races. Engaging in Marxist analysis, Davis argues that women's liberation should consist of women participating in wage labor and domestic labor becoming socialized. She believes that rape is a crime of power, giving the example of white men raping their black slaves. Davis describes the role of race in rape and the archetype of the black male rapist. She also comments on race and birth control, linking abortion-rights movements to the Eugenics Society and commenting on the sterilization of black and Puerto Rican women.

== Analysis ==
Bernice McNair Barnett of the journal Race, Gender & Class wrote that, in Women, Race and Class, Davis was one of the first scholars to make an intersectional analysis of race, gender and class. She and other women of color writers around the same period led to the development of such analyses and research in academia. The field is sometimes known as "integrative race, gender, and class studies". Reviewers for Race & Class compared the book to Ain't I a Woman? (1981) by bell hooks, as both begin with comparisons between white and black women in the abolitionism and suffrage movements of the U.S.

== Reception ==
Valerie A. Batts of the journal Women & Therapy praised the book as an "extremely well documented account" of women's movements in the U.S. She praised Davis' writing as "clear and highly readable". Anne Laurent of the Washington Post agreed that the book was "well-documented" in terms of early history, but criticized it for offering "little new information" and for being "curiously dated" on contemporary history. She praised the book's "factual abundance" but reviewed that it was "a gathering of disparate essays". Race & Class reviewers critiqued that some questions are "left unanswered", particularly in regard to the Marxist analysis omitting discussion of women's relations to use value and exchange value in a capitalist economy, and not accounting for the fact that women's "subordination to" wage labor would be undesirable.
