= Lillian B. Rubin =

American sociologist and writer (1924–2014)

Lillian Breslow Rubin (January 13, 1924 – June 17, 2014) was an American writer, professor, psychotherapist and sociologist. She was a distinguished professor of sociology at Queens College and also worked as a senior researcher at the Institute for the Study of Social Change at the University of California, Berkeley. Rubin was a feminist.

== Biography ==
Rubin was born in Philadelphia, and her parents were Jewish immigrants from Russia. Her father died when she was five. Rubin and her brother moved to New York after her father died where Rubin's mother worked in the garment industry. The family grew up poor, and her mother was abusive, and often told Rubin that "Girls shouldn't be born." Rubin graduated high school at age fifteen and was hired as a secretary, a job her family saw as "a high achievement." Another reason she started working was so that she could help contribute money for her brother to go to college. Her mother had emphasized that girls "marry up," while boys should go to college. Rubin got married when she was nineteen, and had a daughter, Marci. Her first marriage was to an accountant, Seymour Katz. She and her new family moved to Los Angeles in 1952 where she worked as a manager for progressive congressional campaigns. Rubin managed Norman Martell's and Jerry Pacht's congressional campaigns. She and her husband divorced in 1959.

She married Hank Rubin in 1962 and together they moved to the Bay Area. In 1963, Rubin went back to school. Rubin and her daughter attended University of California, Berkeley at roughly the same time, with Rubin earning her bachelor's degree in 1967 and then her masters in 1968. She earned a Ph.D. from UC Berkeley in sociology in 1971. After earning her degrees, she practiced as a private therapist and continued her sociology research. Rubin would spend the rest of her career between both of these fields, "never completely fitting into either." Her work marked her as one of the first feminists to use intersectionality.

In 1973, she was a distinguished professor of sociology at Queens College. Rubin worked as a senior research associate at the Institute for the Study of Social Change at UC Berkeley in 1977. In 1992, she was given an honorary doctorate of humane letters by the State University of New York.

Rubin's husband, Hank, died in 2011 after living with dementia for a decade. Rubin died in her bed of natural causes in 2014.

== Work ==
Rubin wrote several non-fiction books and was a contributor to Salon. She had several best sellers, including Just Friends (1985), Intimate Strangers (1983) and Women of a Certain Age (1979). She also appeared on television to discuss her work and books, such as appearing on the Donahue show.

Rubin's 1976 book, Worlds of Pain: Life in the Working Class Family describes the daily drudgery in the life of "the average worker." These workers were defined as "intact families with neither spouse having more than a high school education," with the husband working manual labor and having at least one child under 12 living at home. Rubin's study was based on her experience with 50 working class couples in the Bay Area. She conducted over 100 interviews with the husbands and wives separately. Rubin also highlights how many working mothers not only had their jobs to contend with, but also the sexist attitude that housework was women's work. The book was considered by the Library Journal to be of interest to both general readers and students of sociology. Worlds of Pain also served as a reminder to middle-class, white feminists that working-class women had been largely forgotten in second-wave feminism.

Women of a Certain Age (1979), looks at middle age from a woman's perspective and relies interviews from 160 different women for the narrative. Rubin found that many women who had lived the first half of their lives as dependents on their husband's income often had difficulty transitioning and becoming more independent. The book helps dispel some stereotypes about middle age, like the idea that middle-aged people have less interest in sex, and that women experience an "empty nest syndrome" when their children leave home.

Rubin addressed couples in Intimate Strangers: What Goes Wrong in Relationships Today - And Why (1983) which found that men often considered their wives their best friends and needed them for emotional support. Rubin felt that it was important to examine not just the emotions and problems of women, but also to get into what men are thinking. She said, "I'm trying to do what hasn't been done before. I want to explain men, not as male chauvinist pigs or power-hungry people, but as comprehensible individuals."

Rubin continued to write about women in Just Friends (1985), which primarily examines female friendship. Rubin described many different types of friendships and how these could change over time as women's roles changed. She interviewed 300 men and women which she used to create the book. Her assessment of men's friendship is that it is more akin to bonding, but not as intimate as what women experience.

Rubin wrote Quiet Rage: Bernie Goetz in a Time of Madness (1986) after the 1984 New York City Subway shooting. The book rejects vigilantism and is critical of Goetz's actions. While promoting the book, she found that she had "tapped into a huge reservoir of anger and hostility when she suggested on radio talk shows that the gunman had not, after all, done a good thing," according to The Washington Post. Rubin found that people continued to support incorrect facts about the case even after having the truth brought forward. In the book, she used letters written to newspapers to show the public's attitude towards the black teenagers who were involved in the incident. The Los Angeles Times called it "an important book on an American dilemma--the urban fear of crime and its devastating impact on race relations."

Her book, Erotic Wars (1991), explores through interviews with 375 adults, sexuality and sexual behavior in America. Rubin found that many sexual problems between heterosexual partners occurred because Americans still felt that sex was a very taboo subject. She also found that many Americans had unrealistic expectations about their sexual partners. Another finding that was she discovered that most Americans did not curtail sexual activity in response to the AIDS crisis, but rather used it as an excuse to slow down their sexual activity.

Families on the Fault Line (1994) is a work that describes the way that race and class are "so intimately intertwined in U.S. society that one often serves as a proxy for the other. Rubin again turns to the working-class in this book and the economic insecurity that many people are facing. She conducted around 400 interviews with working-class people from different racial and ethnic groups to create the book.

Her 2003 book, The Man With the Beautiful Voice, describes some of her experiences as a psychotherapist. In the book, she talks about how psychotherapy is practiced and how it can be reformed. She describes several of her own cases, both the success stories and her own failures.

Rubin's book about aging, 60 On Up (2007), uses her own experiences and the interviews with other senior citizens to describe the challenges aging brings to people today.

== Selected bibliography ==
- Busing and Backlash: White Against White in a California School District. Berkeley: University of California Press. 1972. ISBN 9780520022577.
- Worlds of Pain: Life of the Working-class Family. New York: Basic Books. 1976. ISBN 9780465097241.
- Women of a Certain Age: The Midlife Search for Self. New York: Perennial Library. 1979. ISBN 9780060908331.
- Just Friends: The Role of Friendship in Our Lives. New York: Harper & Row. 1985. ISBN 9780060154608.
- Quiet Rage: Bernie Goetz in a Time of Madness. New York: Farrar, Straus & Giroux. 1986. ISBN 9780571149445.
- Erotic Wars: What Happened to the Sexual Revolution?. New York: Harper Perennial. 1991. ISBN 9780060965648.
- Families on the Fault Line: America's Working Class Speaks about the Family, the Economy, Race, and Ethnicity. New York: Harper Collins. 1994. ISBN 9780060167417.
- Tangled Lives: Daughters, Mothers, and the Crucible of Aging. Boston: Beacon Press. 2000. ISBN 9780807067949.
- The Man With the Beautiful Voice: And More Stories From the Other Side of the Couch. Boston: Beacon Press. 2003. ISBN 9780807029268.
- 60 On Up: The Truth About Aging in the Twenty-first Century. Boston: Beacon Press. 2007. ISBN 9780807029299.
