= Dearden =

- Pronunciation: English: /ˈdɪərdən/
- Language: English

Origin
- Language: English
- Meaning: "the valley of the deer"

Dearden is a patronymic and an English family name meaning "the valley of the deer" deriving from the location, Dearden, near Edenfield, Lancashire.

== People with the surname ==
- Barry Dearden, also known as Barry Deardon (born 1963), Canadian international soccer player
- Basil Dearden (1911–1971), English film director
- Bill Dearden (b. 1944), English athlete and manager in football
- Dick Dearden (1938–2019), United States political figure from Iowa
- Harry Dearden (born 1997), English cricketer
- James Dearden (b. 1949), English film director and screenwriter
- John Dearden (1891–1972), English-born Irish athlete in cricket
- John Francis Dearden (1907–1988), United States prelate and cardinal in the Roman Catholic Church
- Kate Dearden, British politician
- Kevin Dearden (b. 1970), English athlete in football
- Lorraine Dearden (b. 1961), Australo-British economist
- Stephen Dearden (b. 1968), English athlete in cricket
- Stuart Dearden (b. 1990), Scottish athlete in football
- Taylor Dearden (born 1993), American actress
- Thomas Dearden (born 2001), Australian professional rugby league footballer
- Venetia Dearden (born 1975), British photographer and filmmaker
- Nicholas Dearden (born 1960) British Product Designer and inventor of the Expanding Capstan Table
- Michael Dearden (born 1946) South African Springbuck basketball player.

== See also ==
- Duerden
- Durden
