= Reinhold Huhn =

East German border guard (1942–1962)

- Born: 8 March 1942; Braunsberg, Nazi Germany
- Died: 18 June 1962 (aged 20); East Berlin, East Germany
- Military career
- Allegiance: East Germany
- Service years: 1960–1962
- Unit: 4th Border Division

Reinhold Huhn (8 March 1942 – 18 June 1962) was an East German soldier who was killed while serving as a border guard in East Berlin when he attempted to stop a family from escaping to West Berlin.

== Early life ==
Huhn was born in Braunsberg, East Prussia, but in 1946, his family was forced to leave the area for Adorf, Vogtland, since Braunsberg was then controlled by Poland. He completed training as a cattle breeder and briefly worked on a state-owned farm. In 1960, when he turned 18, Huhn enlisted in the police force. In June 1961, Huhn's unit was transferred to Berlin, where they assisted in the construction of the Berlin Wall. After construction, Huhn remained in East Berlin as a guard of the 4th Border Division.

== Death ==
On June 18, 1962, Huhn was standing guard in the middle of the city along with his guard leader.

=== Background ===
Rudolf Müller was a former "border crosser", or a person who had commuted between West and East Berlin for work before the construction of the Berlin Wall. Following construction of the wall, Müller had been living in West Berlin while his wife, two children, and sister-in-law were required by East German authorities to stay in East Berlin. With the help of his brother, Müller dug a tunnel from the grounds of the Springer Verlag to the basement of a building located at Zimmerstrasse 56 in East Berlin.

=== Confrontation ===
When Huhn asked Müller for his papers, Müller produced a pistol and shot Huhn in the chest.

== Legacy ==
A year after his death, the East Berlin city commander dedicated a memorial at the site on the border where he was shot. In the 1970s, this site was expanded into a more general memorial for soldiers who died while guarding the Berlin Wall. On September 11, 1972, American professor and communist Angela Davis visited East Berlin and laid a wreath at the site of the Huhn Memorial. Davis praised Huhn, describing him as a "loyal soldier, who sacrificed his life for his socialist country."

The memorial was removed after the reunification of Germany.

In 1999, Rudolf Müller was convicted of manslaughter and received a one-year suspended sentence. In 2000, the Federal Court of Justice changed the verdict to murder, but did not modify the sentence.
