= Are Prisons Obsolete? =

2003 book by Angela Davis

- Author: Angela Y. Davis
- Language: English
- Genre: Non-fiction
- Publisher: Seven Stories Press
- Publication date: January 4, 2003
- Pages: 128
- ISBN: 9781583225813

Are Prisons Obsolete? is a 2003 book by Angela Y. Davis that advocates for the abolition of the prison system. The book examines the evolution of carceral systems from their earliest incarnation to the modern prison industrial complex. Davis argues that incarceration fails to reform those it imprisons, instead systematically profiting from the exploitation of prisoners. The book explores potential alternatives to the prison system that could transform the justice system from a punitive instrument of control and retribution into a tool capable of changing lives for the better through a combination of autobiography and academic examination. It is a core text in the prison abolition movement.

== Summary ==
=== Chapter 1: Introduction: Prison Reform or Prison Abolition? ===
Davis begins by comparing attitudes towards advocacy for abolishing the death penalty and advocacy for abolishing prisons. Whereas the average person can quite readily imagine a system of justice in which the death penalty has no place, most people cannot imagine the same concerning prisons. Unlike the death penalty, prisons are considered "an inevitable and permanent feature of our social lives". The mission of Are Prisons Obsolete? is to cause the reader to see the prison system as they likely do the death penalty by exposing how unnecessary, ineffective, and inhuman it is. Between 1960 and 2003, the US prison population exploded from 200,000 to over 2,000,000. That makes the United States home to 20% of the world's incarcerated people, a number far out of proportion with its percentage of the world population at large. Davis contends that there is something wrong with this picture and, therefore, something wrong with the systems underlying it.

=== Chapter 4: How Gender Structures the Prison System ===
While a frequent justification to the attention given towards the issues experienced in women's prisons is that they only represent a small proportion of incarcerated individuals in the world, Davis points to how women today are the fastest-growing sector in the United States Prison Population. Davis explores in this chapter how women have been left out of public discussions regarding the expansion of the U.S. prison system, more specifically how practices in both men and women's prisons are gendered. Davis first delves into Assata Shakur's memoirs, which reveal "the dangerous intersections of racism, male domination and state strategies of political oppression." Throughout the chapter Davis explores how women were introduced to the prison industrial complex, the exclusion of female penitentiaries from several prison reforms, the mentalities behind women's incarceration and its justification, and more. For example, Davis explores how in the mid-1800s, male punishment was linked to penance, and that the forfeiture of their rights could be reversed with self-reflection, religious study, and work. In contrast, since women were not considered in possession of those rights, they could not participate in this penance or redemption. Male prisoners were considered to be "public individuals: who had broken a social contract, while women were considered to be "irrevocably fallen women, with no possibility of salvation." Throughout the evolution of women in the prison system, certain reforms resulted in black and Native American women to be segregated from white women, as well as being disproportionately sentenced to male prisons. Passages by Lucia Zedner point also to a link between sentencing practices and the eugenics movement, as prison and lengthy sentences was a way to remove undesirable and "genetically inferior women from social circulation for as many of their child-bearing years as possible."

Davis also delves into the concept of "state-sanctioned sexual assault," where she outlines how women's prison environments are "violently sexualized," mirroring the violence that many women experience in their private lives outside of incarceration. She makes the link between the hyper-sexualisation of female prisoners and that of women of colour in the media, as way to justify the sexual violence that is inflicted upon them. Davis writes that "Studies in female prisons throughout the world indicate that sexual abuse is an abiding, though unacknowledged, form of punishment to which women, who have the misfortune of being sent to prison, are subjected." This is also present in the strip search, which is just one way that the state sanctions an invasive form of assault and violence on women and men very liberally. With a strip search, police officers are vested with powers to do an act which would be considered sexual assault the minute they punch out their time clock.

Davis ends this chapter by stating that the combination of racism and misogyny retains its consequences in women's prisons, and that the uncontested sexual abuse in women's prisons in one of many examples.

== Reception ==
Kim Pate, writing in the Journal of Law and Social Policy, describes Are Prisons Obsolete? as "wonderfully digestible, and therefore accessible", further praising Davis for her recognition of and appreciation for the social realities out of and upon which the modern prison system is built. In Dignity, Savannah Dicus writes that the book "carefully deconstructs prison by examining the origin of imprisonment, its usage as a tool to reinstate institutionalized slavery, and its connections to capitalism." Civil rights activist and former 49ers quarterback Colin Kaepernick wrote that Are Prisons Obsolete? "effectively analyzes the purpose of prisons."
