= Leo Branton Jr. =

American trial lawyer (1922–2013)

Leo Branton Jr. (February 17, 1922 – April 19, 2013) was an American trial lawyer. He attended Tennessee State University and earned his law degree from Northwestern University School of Law in 1948. He served in the Army during World War II. Branton represented Nat King Cole in a label dispute, and Jimi Hendrix's estate, among others. He was well known for representing Angela Davis during her 1972 murder trial and subsequent acquittal.

Branton was born in Pine Bluff, Arkansas on February 17, 1922 to Leo Branton Sr. and Pauline Wiley, the oldest of five children. His mother was a graduate of the Tuskegee Institute.

In 2011, the NAACP honored Branton by awarding him the William Robert Ming Advocacy Award for the spirit of financial and personal sacrifice displayed in his legal work.
