= Durden =

Durden is a surname.

== Notable people with the surname "Durden" include ==
- Benji Durden (born 1951), American coach of runners and former distance runner
- David Durden (born 1998), American football player
- Jane Grier Durden, American civic leader
- Jonathan Durden (born 1957), English businessman and journalist, a contestant on the British 8th season of Big Brother
- Kent Durden (1937–2007), American wildlife photographer
- Nino Durden (born 1963), officer in the elite Los Angeles Police Department Community Resources Against Street Hoodlums unit
- Reggie Durden, former Canadian Football League defensive back
- Richard Durden, (born 1944), English actor
- Tommy Durden (1919–1999), American steel guitarist and songwriter, co-writer of Elvis Presley's Heartbreak Hotel
- William Durden, President of Dickinson College from 1999 to 2013
- Tyler Durden, fictional protagonist and antagonist of the novel Fight Club and its film and comic book adaptations

== See also ==
- Durden Machinery, general engineers to the automotive industry from 1948
- Jo Durden-Smith (1941–2007), British documentary film maker
- Mark Durden-Smith (born 1968), British television presenter
- Forgive Durden, indie rock band from Seattle, Washington, who got their name from the novel Fight Club
- Dearden
