= Duerden =

Duerden is a surname. Notable people with the surname include:

- Brian I. Duerden (born 1948), an English bacteriologist
- Dave Duerden (born 1977), a former Canadian ice hockey player
- Ian Duerden (born 1978), an English former professional football player
- James Duerden, an English professional football player
- James Edwin Duerden, a British zoologist
- Paul Duerden (born 1974), a Canadian volleyball player
- Peter Duerden (born 1945), a retired English-Canadian football defender
- Susan Duerden, a British actress whose roles include the character "Carole Littleton" in the television series "Lost"
- Thomas Lucas Duerden (1898–1969), an English cathedral organist

== See also ==
- Dearden
