= Darden =

Darden may refer to:

== People ==
- Christine Darden (born 1942), American mathematician and engineer
- Christopher Darden (born 1956), American lawyer
- Colgate Darden (1897–1981), American congressman, governor, and University of Virginia president
- Evelyn O. A. Darden, American civil rights lawyer
- George Darden (born 1943), American politician
- Geraldine Claudette Darden (born 1936), African-American mathematician
- Jaelon Darden (born 1999), American football player
- Jimmy Darden (1922–1994), American professional basketball player and coach
- John A. Darden (1879–1942), Alabama attorney, publisher, and state legislator
- Joshua Darden (born 1979), American typeface designer
- Mills Darden (1798–1857), American who was one of the largest people in history
- Ollie Darden (born 1944), American retired professional basketball player
- Paul Darden (born 1968), American poker player
- Thom Darden (born 1950), American retired National Football League player
- Thomas Darden (1900–1961), 37th governor of American Samoa and US Navy captain
- Tony Darden (born 1957), American retired sprinter
- Tony Darden (American football) (born 1975), American National Football League player
- Severn Darden (1929–1995), American comedian and actor
- Stephen Heard Darden (1816–1902), American politician and Confederate politician and officer
- Willie Darden (1933–1988), American man executed in Florida
- Darden Hamilton (born 1956), American politician
- Darden Smith (born 1962), American singer-songwriter

== Other uses ==
- Darden, Tennessee, United States, an unincorporated community and census-designated place
- University of Virginia Darden School of Business, a graduate school
- Darden Field, home stadium for the Colorado School of Mines baseball teams
- Darden Hotel (Hamilton, North Carolina), on the National Register of Historic Places
- City Hotel (Marthaville, Louisiana), also known as "Hotel Darden", on the National Register of Historic Places
- Darden Restaurants, a restaurant management company
