= Humberto Fontova =

Cuban-American political commentator

- Born: 1954 (age 71–72); Havana, Cuba
- Occupations: Author, Columnist, Public Speaker, Political commentator

Humberto Fontova (born 1954) is a Cuban-American author, blogger, political commentator, and conservative polemicist. A critic of the Castro regime, many of his works are aimed at correcting the record to what he contends is the unreported and inaccurate portrayal of Castro's Cuba. Fontova is a frequent contributor to several websites and has made guest appearances on The O’Reilly Factor and Fox News show Hannity and Colmes.

== Early life ==
Fontova was born in 1954 in Havana, Cuba. Fontova's family went into exile to the United States (New Orleans) in 1961, when he was seven years old. Coinciding with their exodus, his father was held prisoner by the regime of Fidel Castro for three months after the Cuban Revolution, although he was later released. A short time later Fontova's cousin Pedro, whom he describes as a "fervent Catholic activist" who spoke out against the new regime, died while in Cuban state custody. The official cause of death given was a heart attack, although Fontova believes he was murdered by police interrogators.

== Writing career ==
=== Outdoors ===
As an avid hunter, fisherman and scuba diver, Fontova began his publishing career writing for the outdoor themed magazines Louisiana Sportsman, Sierra, Scuba Times and Bowhunter. In 2001 he published his first book The Helldivers' Rodeo, an account of an extreme scuba diving and spear fishing adventure, followed in 2003 by The Hellpig Hunt, about a hunting adventure in the wetlands along the Mississippi River.

=== Politics ===
Fontova later entered the political publishing arena and authored three Cuba-related polemics. Fidel: Hollywood's Favorite Tyrant in 2005, Exposing the Real Che Guevara and the Useful Idiots Who Idolize Him in 2007, and The Longest Romance: The Mainstream Media and Fidel Castro in 2013. The former criticizes American celebrities, particularly Hollywood actors, who lavishing praise on Fidel Castro's government in Cuba and meeting with Castro personally. Among those singled out are Jack Nicholson, Danny Glover, Harry Belafonte, Chevy Chase, Steven Spielberg, Ted Turner, and Dan Rather. Fontova interviews dissidents as well as former government agents, such as Delfin Fernandez. In Exposing the Real Che Guevara, Fontova critiques the life of Che Guevara and those who lionize him.

== Reviews ==
Robert D. Chapman, a former CIA officer who served in Cuba, wrote in a review of Exposing the Real Che Guevara in the International Journal of Intelligence and CounterIntelligence that "His information is based almost exclusively upon exile sources. Some accounts I know are true, some untrue, and others are exaggerated war fables." Writing a review of The Longest Romance in the same journal, Chapman writes that "I don't know where he obtained the many doubtful statistics he cites" and that "Fontova often presents pictures of Cuba that never happened".

Travel author Rolf Potts, in a review of Exposing the Real Che Guevara for World Hum, noted that "taken in selective doses", the book puts "some well-placed holes in Che’s presumed humanism and military competence." However, Potts said that what "is meant to be a polemic against Guevara’s t-shirt-certified mythology" actually ends up showing "how Che’s reputation benefits from the myopic fury and misguided political influence of those who hate him the most." Potts said that the book's "slightly schizophrenic tone" meanders off into subject matter that has little to do with the book's premise, that the book seems "less an indictment of Guevara than the New York Times or John F. Kennedy. Ultimately, Potts states, the book is "less about Che Guevara than the King Lear-style resentments of the Cuban-Americans who hate him — and the effectiveness of its argument suffers as a result."

Commentator and former research director of the Adam Smith Institute Alex Singleton reviewed Exposing the Real Che Guevara for the Social Affairs Unit. He said that "Fontova's book aims to challenge the mythology surrounding Guevara. At the very least, it will provide useful factual ammunition for conservatives and libertarians." Singleton differed with Fontova's view on libertarian opponents of America's Cuban embargo, saying that, "The embargo has been completely ineffective but created an excuse for Cuba's poor economic performance." Nevertheless, Singleton concluded that the book was an important one, having earlier in the review expressed the hope that it would "encourage scholars to reanalyse the conventional wisdom."

Journalist and Buenos Aires bureau chief for Dow Jones Newswires Michael Casey reviewed Exposing the Real Che Guevara in his 2009 book Che's Afterlife: The Legacy of an Image. Casey described it as "an art form of mixing frustration with ridicule." Casey said that Fontova's prose was a marriage of Ann Coulter with the Gonzo journalism of Hunter S. Thompson, and that Fontova "basically yells at his readers, mixing a sarcastic wit with a touch of self-deprecation until it is overwhelmed by disdain for his opponents." Lastly, Casey observed that Fontova often "lathers himself into a rage" when it comes to the issue of Che Guevara, noting that his barrage of hyperbole leads him to describe Guevara as an "assassin", "sadist", "bumbler", "fool", and "whimpering-sniveling-blubbering coward" who is "revered by millions of imbeciles." Other descriptions by Fontova of Guevara, cited by Casey, were "shallow", "boorish", "epically stupid", "a fraud", a "murdering swine", an "intellectual vacuum", and an "insufferable Argentine jackass."

== Works ==
- The Helldivers' Rodeo: A Deadly, X-Treme, Scuba-Diving, Spearfishing, Adventure Amid the Off Shore Oil Platforms in the Murky Waters of the Gulf of Mexico, M.Evans & Company, (2001), ISBN 978-0-87131-936-4
- The Hellpig Hunt, M.Evans & Company, (2003), ISBN 978-1-59077-009-2
- Fidel: Hollywood's Favorite Tyrant, Regnery Publishing, (2005), ISBN 978-0-89526-043-7
- Exposing the Real Che Guevara and the Useful Idiots Who Idolize Him, Sentinel HC, (2007), ISBN 978-1-59523-027-0
- The Longest Romance: The Mainstream Media and Fidel Castro, Encounter Books, (2013), ISBN 978-1594036675
