= Durden Machinery =

- Industry: Woodworking machinery
- Founded: 1948; 78 years ago
- Founder: Frank Reginald Durden
- Headquarters: Glynde, South Australia, Australia
- Number of employees: 20

== The beginning ==
Durden and Co. commenced business as general engineers to the automotive industry in 1948. The founder Frank Reginald Durden produced his first woodworking machine, a thickness planner, in 1951. This was quickly followed with the introduction of the popular "Pacemaker" universal woodworker in 1954. Several models of the 'Pacemaker" were produced in the ensuing years and exported to different countries around the world.

== Growth ==
The years from 1960 saw the company grow with the introduction of a range of machinery for the 'Do it yourself' market and educational training. The range included thickness planner, circular saws, planers, bandsaws and wood lathes.

== Today ==
Today Durden machines are used in industry and technical colleges. The Durden Top Turn Wood Lathe is offered with electronic variable speed drives, knee bar stop actuation and modular bed design. Sadly Durden was bought out by Hercus some years ago and now the Durden side of the company no longer exists. No parts are available for any of their machines anymore.
