= Charles Dirden III =

American actor and comedian

- Born: November 17, 1970 (age 54); Los Angeles, CA, U.S.
- Occupation: Actor/Comedian
- Spouse: Lynay Dirden

Charles Dirden III (born November 17, 1970) is an American actor and comedian.

Charles Dirden III was born on November 17, 1970, in Los Angeles, California, US. He is an actor and comedian, known for The Movies Getting back to Zero, Shot, and Let's Meet Those People. As well as his television work in the America Crime TV series on ABC and GangInc TV series. He has been married to Lynay Dirden since 2002 and they have three daughters.

== Film ==
Year	Film	Role
2013	Gang Inc.	Delroy
2013	Getting Back to Zero	James
2001	Focus	Rap Artist
2001	Let's Meet Those People	Jim
