= If They Come in the Morning =

1971 book by Angela Davis

- 2016 edition by Verso Books
- Author: Angela Davis
- Subject: Prisons
- Genre: Non-fiction
- Publisher: The Third Press
- Publication date: 1971
- Publication place: United States
- Pages: 266
- ISBN: 9781784787691

If They Come in the Morning: Voices of Resistance is a collection of writings about U.S. legal trials and prisons, edited by Angela Davis and published in 1971. Contributors included Black Panther Party members and the Soledad Brothers. As Davis' first book, it contains description of her experiences in prison. The book was positively received by African-American and communist media of the time.

== Background ==
Angela Davis is a Marxist feminist author born in Alabama, United States, in 1944. After majoring in French at Brandeis University and studying under the philosopher Herbert Marcuse, she taught philosophy at the University of California, Los Angeles, but was fired, re-hired and then fired a second time over her political beliefs in the late 1960s. In 1970, the Soledad Brothers—George Jackson, Fleeta Drumgo, and John Clutchette—were charged with murdering a white prison guard, whose shooting of three black prisoners involved in a fist fight was judged "justifiable homicide". In the 1970 Marin County Civic Center attacks, Jackson's brother Jonathan Jackson and others attempted to force the release of the Soledad Brothers by holding a judge hostage, the resultant shootout leaving Jackson and three others dead. Davis was jailed from 1970 to 1972 for purchasing guns used by Jonathan Jackson in the attack. She was later acquitted. If They Come in the Morning was published in 1971. It was Davis' first book credit.

== Synopsis ==
The book is a collection of 27 writings, edited by Angela Davis in collaboration with Bettina Aptheker. It contains letters from each of the three Soledad Brothers, as well as contributions from prominent Black Panther Party (BPP) members and Davis' co-counsels Margaret Burnham and Howard Moore. Julian Bond provided a foreword.

The writings cover the U.S. legal system, particularly trials and prisons. Davis gives an account of her experiences in prison, while Aptheker writes about their social functions. BPP co-founders Huey P. Newton and Bobby Seale and activist Ericka Huggins analyze contemporary trials of BPP members. Jessica Mitford argues that California's approach to prisons, which she calls "psychological rehabilitation", cannot be fixed by reform until prisoners are allowed legal representation. A group of Folsom State Prison inmates contribute a manifesto of demands.

== Reception ==
Labour Monthly reviewer William J. Pomeroy called the book "perhaps the most shattering indictment yet to appear of the repression by the American state of black militants". Robert Chrisman of The Black Scholar found it "a brilliant and comprehensive collection [...] on the revolutionary struggle of black prisoners against the repressive machinery of prisons and the court system". The Sun-Reporter's Gwen Evans praised it for "brilliant statements on the right of self-representation and lucid political analysis". Loyle Hairston of New York Amsterdam News highlighted contributor Ruchell Magee—who was involved in the Marin County Civic Center attacks—as "the most moving personality in the book". Hairston also lauded the "depth of [Davis'] humanity, the force of her eloquence [and] the fierceness of her integrity".

The British writer Benjamin Zephaniah wrote that the book was an influence on him as a teenager. Though he found the book difficult to follow, he said that "Angela Davis taught me that I did not have to tolerate the racism that I was suffering in the playground [...] I was not alone", adding that "it was in this book that I first came across the word 'Solidarity', then I realised the importance of working together".
