= John Dearden (cricketer) =

Irish cricketer (1891–1972)

Cricket information
- Batting: Right-handed

International information
- National side: Ireland

Career statistics
Competition	First-class
Matches	2
Runs scored	84
Batting average	28.00
100s/50s	0/1
Top score	84
Catches/stumpings	1/1
- Source: CricketArchive, 6 December 2022

John Dearden, also known as John Deardon (26 December 1891 – 4 May 1972) was an Irish cricketer. A right-handed batsman and wicket-keeper, he made his debut for the Ireland cricket team against Scotland in July 1922 and went on to play for Ireland on four occasions, his last match coming against Wales in June 1926.

Of his matches for Ireland, two had first-class status. In all matches for Ireland, he scored in only one match, an innings of 84 against Wales in his final game.

He also played in a Minor Counties Championship match for the Lancashire Second XI against the Yorkshire Second XI.
