= Jerry Pacht =

American judge

Mendel Jerome Pacht
- Born: January 24, 1922; Los Angeles, California, U.S.
- Died: April 1, 1997 (aged 75); Santa Monica, California, U.S.
- Education: UCLA, USC
- Occupations: Judge, lawyer
- Years active: 1965–1997
- Notable work: Rulings on public drunkenness, Angela Davis case, tenant rights
- Spouse: Judith Pacht
- Parent(s): Isaac Pacht, Rose Rudolph

Mendel Jerome Pacht (January 24, 1922 – April 1, 1997) was an American judge who served on the California Superior Court. Pacht proclaimed himself an "activist" and was known for dismissing a charge of public drunkenness against a defendant, ruling that alcoholism was a disease and not a crime.

Pacht was born in Los Angeles and earned a bachelor's degree at UCLA, worked briefly at Metro-Goldwyn-Mayer, then joined the Army as a lieutenant during World War II. He had a desire to become a singer, but instead earned a law degree at USC after the war. He became a litigation lawyer, specializing in publishing and entertainment.

He twice ran unsuccessfully for Congress as a Democrat and was chairman of the Los Angeles County Democratic Central Committee. He headed the legal committee of the county branch of the American Civil Liberties Union and was also in charge of the local legal defense fund of the National Association for the Advancement of Colored People.

Pacht was named by Governor Edmund G. (Pat) Brown to the Los Angeles Municipal Court in 1965 and elevated to the Superior Court bench the next year. His rulings. which amounted to 135 in number, included:

- A decision in municipal court that alcoholism or public drunkenness was not a crime, but a disease. He was overruled on appeal, but he "proudly noted that his ruling influenced legislation to set up detoxification centers and was reprinted in the Congressional Record."
- Striking down a University of California policy against the hiring of Communists when he forbade the UC Board of Regents from firing philosophy instructor Angela Davis from her job at UCLA. The ruling prompted a recall effort, which failed.
- Invalidation of a 90-year-old "claim and delivery" law, which had permitted law-enforcement officers to seize personal property when installment debtors fell behind in their payments. He said the debtor had a right to contest in court any seizure of property.
- Upholding the right of the Los Angeles Times to caricature Mayor Sam Yorty during an election campaign. Yorty lost an appeal to the U.S. Supreme Court.
- Judge Pacht also ruled that periodic tenancies required good cause for termination, despite state law allowing termination for any or no reason. Under AB1482, eff. January 1, 2020, tenancy terminations require just cause, as specified. His vision has also materialized at the legislative level.

== Personal life ==
Pacht was the son of judge Isaac Pacht and Rose (née Rudolph). He was married to Judith Pacht. He died of a cerebral hemorrhage on April 1, 1997, in Santa Monica, California.
