= John A. Darden =

American politician

John Austin Darden (1879 – June 7, 1942) was an American attorney and publisher who served in the Alabama state legislature.

Darden was "a prominent, very wealthy member of his community", and served in the Alabama House of Representatives from 1914 to 1919, and again from 1926 to 1933, and in the Alabama Senate from 1931 to 1933. In addition, Darden practiced law in Goodwater, Alabama, for 40 years, and was the publisher of a newspaper called the Goodwater Enterprise, and "served as correspondent for the Birmingham News and Age-Herald and the Montgomery Advertiser". In 1919, Darden established an annual homecoming at Poplar Springs Baptist Church, and in 1940 he established another one at the Flint Hill Methodist Church.

In 2023, it was discovered that Darden was the biological grandfather of civil rights activist Angela Davis, through an extramarital relationship with Davis's grandmother, who was black. Darden also had four sons and two daughters through his marriage to his white wife, who survived him. Darden died in Goodwater, Alabama, at the age of 63. A memorial was dedicated to him at his church the following month.
