= Delfín Fernández =

Cuban spy

Delfín Fernández is a former Cuban spy who spent 15 years working for the Cuban counterintelligence Department 11 with the codename Agent Otto. He defected from Cuba and moved to Spain in 1999. He settled in Spain for five years, becoming one of Europe's most successful bodyguards. In 2005 Fernández moved to Miami, Florida and as of 2006 he was waiting to get U.S. residency under the Cuban Adjustment Act.

== Defection from Cuba ==
Fernández, 44 in 2006, emigrated from Cuba in 1999 after becoming disillusioned with Castro's government. As part of Fidel and Raúl Castro's inner circle, Delfín Fernández asserts that he learnt everything from why the Cuban leader incinerates his dirty underwear to his cravings for pricey Spanish ham. Fernández claims that he was once sent to Spain to bring $2,500 worth of the pata negra delicacy back to Cuba because Fidel Castro had a penchant for imported cured Spanish hams and a paranoia about assassination. Fernández said that chief bodyguard, Bienvenido "Chicho" Pérez, had told him that Castro had his underwear burned to foil any assassination plots with chemicals during laundering.

His disillusionment with the government, he said, and his ambitions for a better life compelled him to defect. Fernández made a series of allegations, including a claim that Raúl Castro had stolen millions of pounds from government coffers. He said that Fidel Castro and his brother, Raúl, assembled incriminating dossiers on foreign businessmen who wanted to invest in Cuba. Fernández recorded every word and movement of high-profile visitors to Cuba with a high-tech array of hidden microphones and video cameras. He worked for Cuba's Department 11, set up to infiltrate hotels and travel agencies. There he acted as a spy under the cover of his official title as Operations Manager for the Guitart hotel chain, where he claimed that guests could be open to blackmail. He also stated that he bugged the hotel rooms of foreign politicians and businessmen under orders from Raúl. Fernández said he carried suitcases with cash out of Cuba for the Castro brothers.

Fernández said he defected in Spain in 1999 on a trip to Europe to drop off Raúl's daughter, Mariela Castro Espín, in Italy to visit her father-in-law and pick up a Rottweiler in Germany for Fidel. According to former CIA analyst Brian Latell, a senior researcher at the University of Miami's Institute for Cuban and Cuban American Studies and someone described by the Miami Herald as "helping shape public opinion about Cuba's future", "A lot of the stories he told me were fascinating, and I found almost all of them to be highly credible." Fernández has been an outspoken critic of the Cuban government since he defected.

== Bodyguard ==
Fernández settled in Spain for five years, becoming one of Europe's most successful bodyguards. Among his clients in Spain: actors Antonio Banderas and his wife, Melanie Griffith, soccer star David Beckham, Spanish actresses Ana Obregón and Esther Cañadas, former Spice Girl Emma Bunton, bullfighter Francisco Rivera Ordóñez and several high-profile businessmen. Before his defection, Fernández claims that one of his key tasks was to spy on wealthy visitors to the island, including film stars Leonardo DiCaprio and Jack Nicholson. In 2004 he worked minding Hollywood star Antonio Banderas in Spain.

=== Sports star scandal ===
According to David Smith of the Observer, Fernández who worked for David Beckham for three months when he first moved to Madrid and in 2004 would sell personal information about his ex-boss's affairs with Rebecca Loos for £500,000. Fernández admitted he had been approached by paparazzi, who would follow Beckham everywhere. But he insisted that he had always turned down their lucrative cash offers to spill the beans. Fernández said that he saw Beckham kissing Rebecca Loos in the back of his car and that he drove them to the Santa Mauro hotel in Madrid three times. He said, "I could see them kissing in the rear-view mirror. The car had dark tinted windows so nobody could see in from the outside. After that there were three more occasions I drove them to hotels in the early hours." Fernández said that when they had their privacy Beckham and his assistant were "all over each other like teenagers". Victoria (Posh Spice) Beckham was said to be in tears over tabloid reports that her husband, "Becks," had been having a torrid affair with his former aide, Rebecca Loos. Beckham had been photographed clubbing with Loos who used to work for his management company.

== Public life ==
The Spanish media have embraced him, writing dozens of articles about his life as a Castro insider and bodyguard. He was also a consultant on an investigative book, Conexión Habana, by Spanish authors.

After living in Spain for five years he arrived in Miami where he had a spot on a TV show on WJAN-Channel 41. There, as a regular television guest, he caught the imagination of the Cuban community with his disclosures of Castro's habits and idiosyncrasies and the workings of his inner circle. Oscar Haza, a popular Spanish language talk show host on Channel 41, has invited Fernández on his show, A Mano Limpia, at least six times, firing up the ratings when he's a guest, said Channel 41 news director Miguel Cossío. The ratings were so strong that Channel 41 offered to let Fernández be a permanent guest on a new daily weekday show, Arrebatados, at 6 p.m., hosted by Maria Laria.
