= Marin County Civic Center attacks =

1970 attacks in California, US

Marin County Civic Center attack
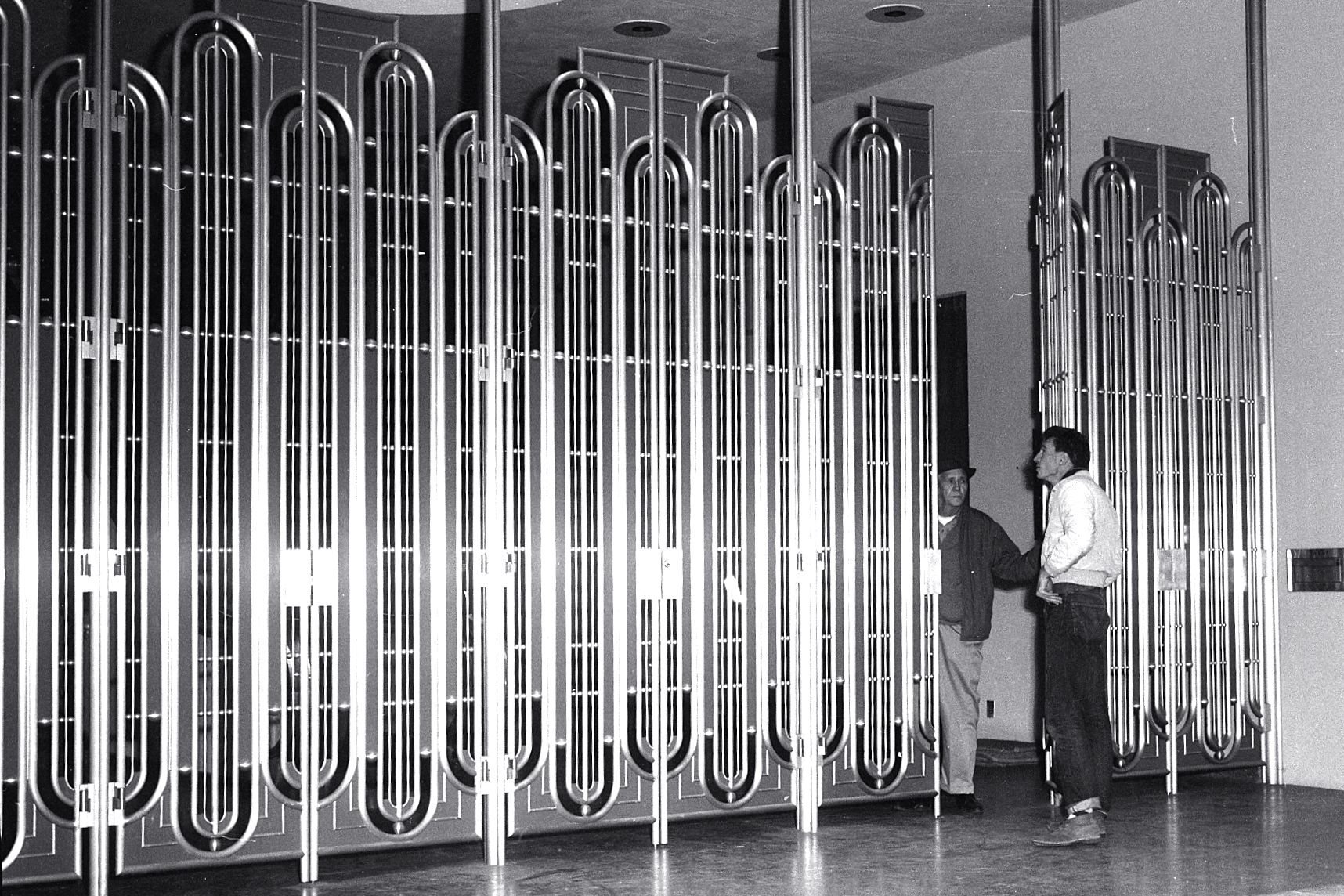
- Entrance to Marin County Civic Center, photographed in 1963
- Location: 37°59′54″N 122°31′51″W; Marin County Civic Center, San Rafael, California, US
- Date: August 7, 1970
- Attack type: Kidnapping, murder, psychological torture
- Deaths: 4 (including 3 perpetrators)
- Injuries: 3 (including 1 perpetrator)
- Assailants: Jonathan P. Jackson (killed); James McClain (killed); Ruchell Magee; William Arthur Christmas (killed)
- Motive: Release of the Soledad Brothers

The Marin County Civic Center attacks were two related attacks in 1970 at the Marin County Superior Court, located in the Marin County Civic Center in San Rafael, California, United States, tied to escalating racial tensions in the state's criminal justice system.

On August 7, 17-year-old Jonathan P. Jackson attempted to coerce the release of the Soledad Brothers (including Jackson's older brother George) by kidnapping Superior Court judge Harold Haley from the Marin County Civic Center. As the kidnappers attempted to leave with five hostages by car, one of the kidnappers shot at police. Four people were killed in the ensuing gunfight, including Jonathan Jackson and Haley, and three others were wounded.

The event received intense media coverage, as did the subsequent manhunt and trial of Angela Davis, an ousted professor from UCLA with connections to George and Jonathan Jackson, and the Black Panthers. Davis owned the weapons used in the incident but stated that she had no knowledge of its happening.

The second attack took place on October 8 of that year, when the Weathermen detonated explosives at the Civic Center in support of the earlier incident.

== Background ==
=== Petition by W.L. Nolen ===
In the summer of 1969, W.L. Nolen, a 25-year-old inmate at Soledad prison in California who had been convicted in 1963 for robbery, began circulating a petition to file a lawsuit against the prison's superintendent, Cletus J. Fitzharris. Nolen's petition charged that guards and officials at the facility knew of "existing social and racial conflicts" and that they had been seeking to excite them through "direct harassment and in ways not actionable in court," including the filing of false disciplinary reports and intentionally leaving black inmates' cells unlocked to put them in danger of assault. He claimed officials were "willfully creating and maintaining situations that creates and poses dangers to the plaintiff [himself]" and that he "feared for his life."

=== Soledad shootings on January 13, 1970 ===
On January 13, 1970, three black prisoners were shot and killed at Soledad by corrections officer Opie G. Miller. The three prisoners were:

1. W.L. Nolen (see above);
2. Cleveland Edwards, then 21, who had been convicted in 1967 of assaulting a police officer; and
3. Alvin Miller, then 23, who had been convicted of robbery.

According to Ellsworth Ferguson, an administrative assistant to Fitzharris at the time, a fight began during a scheduled exercise period for 15 inmates from the maximum security wing of the prison. During the conflict, two white inmates among the group were beaten to the ground and officer Miller was reportedly "fearful that several might be seriously hurt or killed." Officials later stated that it was "surmised" that the fight was racial in nature.

Officer Miller, an expert marksman, shouted and blew a whistle but gave no warning shot before firing on Nolen, Edwards and Alvin Miller. White inmate Billy D. Harris, then 23, who was serving time for assault and perjury, was injured.

According to statements made by inmates, there had been an intentional mixing of white and black prisoners who were known racists in the yard, and that some manner of fight had been anticipated. The congregation of the 15 men in the prison yard had been the first integrated exercise period in several months. The death of a black inmate, Clarence Causey, who had been stabbed to death in 1968, had left racial tensions running high, and for several months prior to January 13, inmates had only been allowed exercise in the yard one at a time.

Furthermore, inmates claimed that the guards intentionally barred them from taking the wounded prisoners to the hospital, allowing the three shooting victims to bleed for nearly twenty minutes before they were finally taken to receive medical aid. Thomas Meneweather, a black inmate who was present for the shootings and reportedly attempted to carry Alvin Miller inside, stated, "I started to walk toward the door through which we had entered the yard but the tower guard pointed the gun at me and shook his head. Then I started forward with tears in my eyes, expecting to be shot down every minute, but the tower guard told me, 'That's far enough.' "

The next day, 13 black inmates housed in the prison began a hunger strike, demanding a federal investigation of Officer Miller's actions, in addition to requesting segregated facilities and "psychiatric examinations by a black psychiatrist for all gun tower guards."

Officer Opie Miller was exonerated of the deaths of prisoners a few days later by a Monterey County grand jury. None of the black inmates present for the shootings were asked to testify.

=== Murder of John Vincent Mills at Soledad ===
On January 17, 1970, four days after the shootings, prison guard John Vincent Mills was beaten, dragged up three flights of stairs and tossed to his death. A note found beside his body read "One down, two to go."

Three black inmates were charged with the murder and were transferred to San Quentin to await trial. The three defendants, Fleeta Drumgo, John Clutchette and George Jackson, eventually came to be known as the "Soledad Brothers". Jackson was known at the time to be a political activist and writer, and he and Nolen had worked together in 1966 to found the prison gang the Black Guerrilla Family, a black power group targeting what they saw as the white racist infrastructure of the prison system.

=== Escalating racial violence at Soledad ===
Following the January 13 shootings and the subsequent murder of John Mills, racial tensions grew increasingly violent at Soledad. On March 16, 1970, white guards William Monagan and Wallace Coffman were held hostage for approximately 45 minutes by five inmates before tear gas was deployed to free them. The incident was reported in The Bulletin.

On July 23, 1970, a white guard, William H. Shull, was found stabbed to death in a shed for exercise equipment. Forty different wounds were found on his body. Six days later, the body of a white convicted robber, Roy William Turner, was found shoved under his prison cell cot.

== August 7, 1970, attack ==
In August 1970, a group associated with the Soledad Brothers organized an armed assault on the Marin County courthouse to demand George Jackson's immediate release. The assault took place during a trial for James McClain, for the stabbing of a prison guard, with Judge Harold Haley presiding.

The person in charge of the kidnapping was George Jackson's younger brother, Jonathan Peter Jackson, aged 17. Two days before the kidnapping, former UCLA instructor Angela Davis purchased a shotgun from a pawn shop in San Francisco. After Davis paid for the shotgun, its barrel was sawed off so as to be concealable.

On the day before the kidnapping, Angela Davis and Jonathan Jackson were alleged to have been in a rented yellow utility van at the Marin Courthouse. Jonathan Jackson went into the courtroom where James McClain was on trial. Jackson was wearing a long buttoned-up raincoat, despite the heat and lack of rain. The van had trouble running, so Jackson and Davis drove to a gas station down the street from the courthouse to get the van repaired.

On Friday, August 7, 1970, a heavily armed Jonathan Jackson returned to the courthouse in the yellow van. He entered the courtroom again wearing the long raincoat, and brought three guns registered to Davis into the Hall of Justice.

Jackson sat among the spectators for a few minutes before opening his satchel, drawing a pistol and throwing it to Black Panther defendant James McClain. Jackson then produced an Iver Johnson paratrooper-style, vertical front-gripped M1 carbine with a 20-round "banana"-shaped magazine from his raincoat as McClain held the pistol against Haley's head. Jackson was reported as saying "Freeze. Just freeze." He then told court officials, attorneys and jurors to lie on the floor while another San Quentin inmate, Ruchell Magee, who was to have witnessed at McClain's trial, went to free three other testifying prisoners from their holding cell. A couple with a baby was also ordered into the judge's chambers.

After being freed by Magee, a fourth man, Black Panther William Arthur Christmas, joined the other three kidnappers. Haley was forced at gunpoint to call the sheriff Louis P. Mountanos, in the hopes of convincing the police to refrain from intervening. Road flares, which were used to simulate sticks of dynamite, were held against Haley's neck before being replaced with the sawed-off shotgun which was fastened under his chin with adhesive tape. The kidnappers, after some debate, then secured four other hostages whom they bound with piano wire: Deputy District Attorney Gary Thomas and jurors Maria Elena Graham, Doris Whitmer, and Joyce Rodoni.

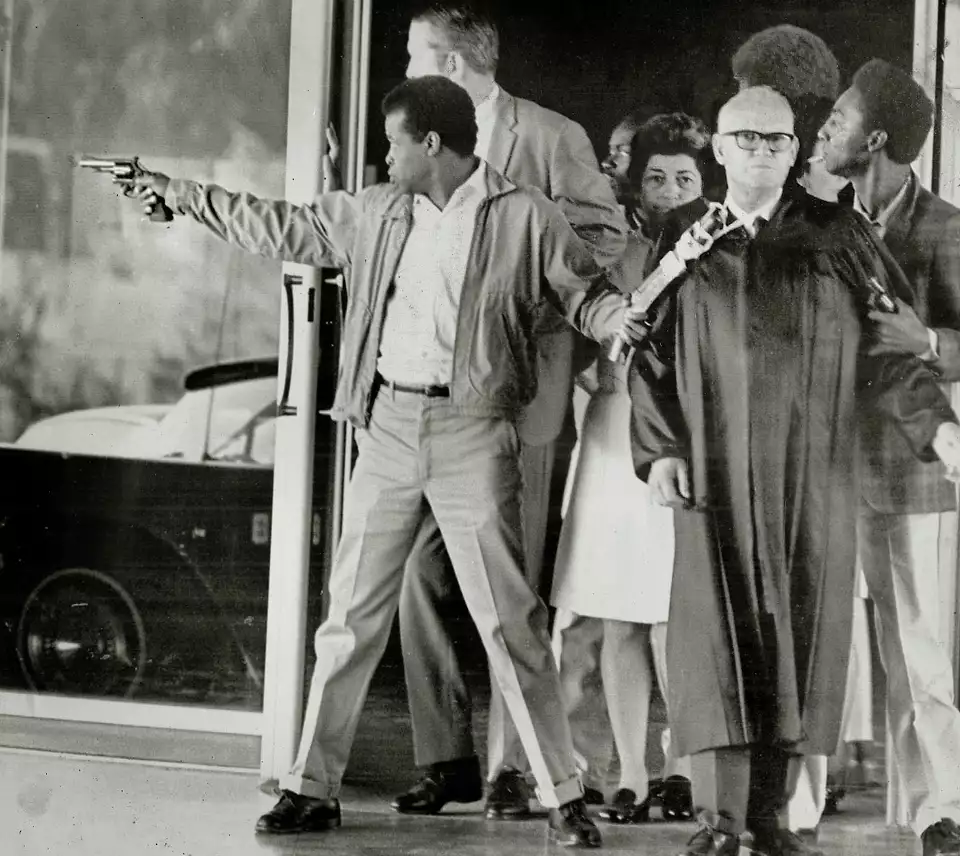
McClain holds a gun to Haley's head as he escorts the hostages out of the building

The four kidnappers and five hostages then moved into the corridor of the courthouse, which at this point had become crowded with responding police who had been summoned by a bailiff. No action was taken against them at this point. Around this time, Jim Kean, a photographer for the San Rafael Independent Journal, arrived at the building after he had heard news of the incident from police radio in his car. He stepped off an elevator directly adjacent to the hostages and kidnappers, and was reportedly told by one of them, "You take all the pictures you want. We are the revolutionaries." Kean and his colleague Roger Bockrath took a series of photographs of the group, apparently after some brief discussion as to whether the two journalists should be added to the ranks of the hostages.

The group then entered the elevator, informing the police that "[they wanted] the Soledad brothers freed by 12:30 today." When the hostages were forced out onto the sidewalk in front of the Hall of Justice, Haley asked where they were being taken. He was told they were being taken to the airport where they would get a plane. The kidnappers then forced the hostages into a rented Ford van which they began to drive towards an exit leading to the U.S. 101 freeway.

The police had set up a roadblock outside of the Civic Center in anticipation of the group leaving. As Jonathan Jackson drove the hostages and three convicts away from the courthouse, front passenger McClain shot at the police stationed in the parking lot. The police shot back. Haley died as a result of a fatal wound from the shotgun which left a "gaping hole" in his head as well as a pistol shot to the chest fired inside the van from a stolen .357 Magnum pistol. Deputy District Attorney Gary Thomas, one of the hostages, grabbed a gun from Jackson and began shooting at the kidnappers. A shooting melee ensued, in which three Black Panthers were killed. The sole Black Panther abductor to survive was Ruchell Magee, who was wounded. Thomas was paralyzed for life by a bullet through the spine. Maria Elena Graham, one of the jurors being held captive, suffered a bullet wound to her arm.

== Aftermath ==
Four people died during the Civic Center shooting and three were wounded. The four dead were Judge Harold Haley, Jonathan Jackson, William Christmas, and James McClain. Haley died as a result of wounds from the shotgun which had been taped to his neck and a pistol shot to the chest from a .357 magnum that Christmas had taken from Sheriff Louis Mountanos. Jackson and Christmas were killed by the police. Prosecutor Thomas (who had taken a .357 magnum pistol from Jackson) and Deputy David Mori, shot McClain fatally in the back and seriously wounded Magee in the chest. In addition to Magee, the two others wounded were Deputy District Attorney Gary Thomas and juror Maria Elena Graham. Thomas was seriously wounded and paralyzed by three bullets fired from a .30-caliber rifle by San Quentin Prison guards. Graham, one of the jurors being held captive, was shot in the arm by William Christmas.

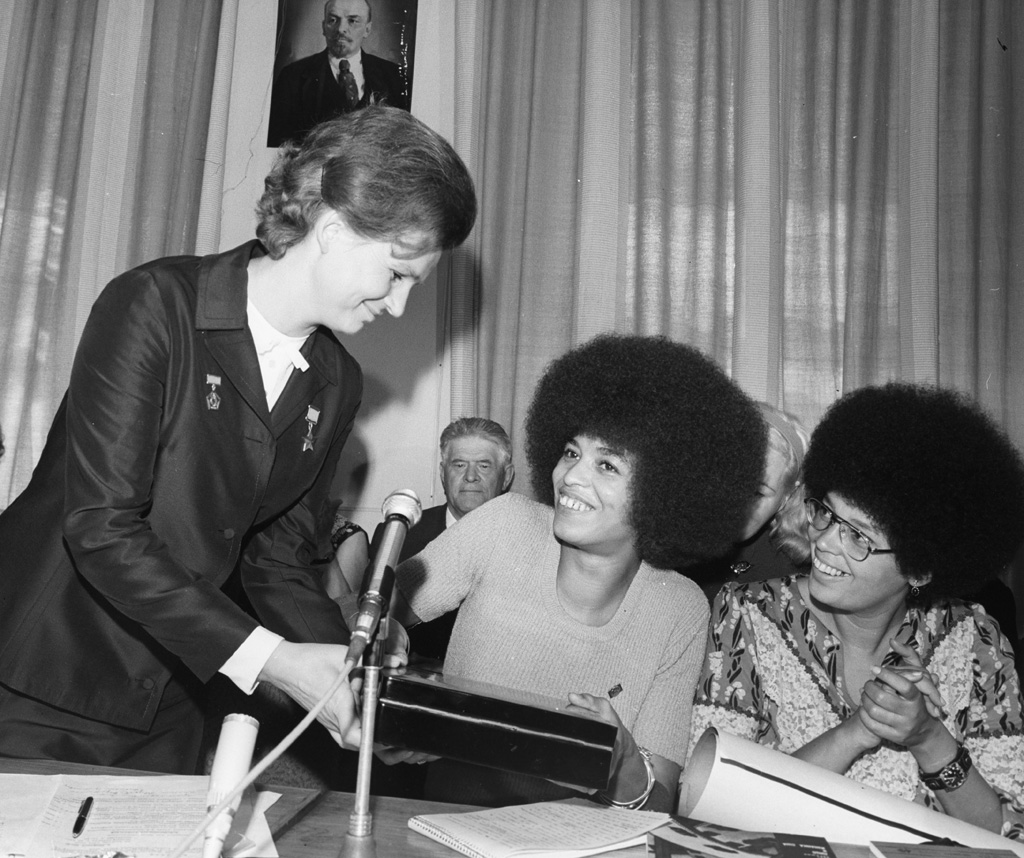
Angela Davis with Valentina Tereshkova

Following the events of August 7, a warrant was issued for the arrest of Angela Davis. She became a fugitive and fled California. She was secreted to Chicago to meet up with fellow Communist leader David Poindexter Jr., who took her to Miami, Florida. In an effort to hide from authorities, Davis used false identification, cut off her afro, wore a wig, plucked her eyebrows, wore makeup, and donned business eyeglasses. On October 13, 1970, FBI agents found her at the Howard Johnson Motor Lodge in New York City. President Richard M. Nixon congratulated the FBI on its "capture of the dangerous terrorist, Angela Davis". Davis was charged as an accomplice to conspiracy, kidnapping, and homicide. In 1972, she was tried and found not guilty on all counts.

Ruchell Magee pleaded guilty to the charge of aggravated kidnapping for his part in the assault. In return for his plea, the Attorney General asked the Court to dismiss the charge of murder (of Judge Harold Haley). Magee later attempted unsuccessfully to withdraw his plea, and was sentenced in 1975 to life in prison. He was imprisoned in Corcoran State Prison and lost numerous bids for parole. On July 21, 2023, Magee received compassionate release and died a few weeks later; he had spent 67 years of his life in prison.

== October 8 bombing and beyond ==
Marin County Civic Center bombing (October 1970)
- Location: 37°59′54″N 122°31′51″W; Marin County Civic Center, San Rafael, California, US
- Date: October 8, 1970
- Attack type: Bombing
- Perpetrator: Weather Underground
- Motive: Retribution for law enforcement response to August attack and glorification of its perpetrators

On October 8, 1970, the Marin County Courthouse was bombed. A group known as the Weathermen later claimed responsibility for the action, which was carried out in retaliation for the killing of Jackson and the other abductors.

In 1971, three days before he was to go on trial for the Mills murder (see § Murder of John Vincent Mills at Soledad), George Jackson was fatally shot in the prison yard of San Quentin during a riotous escape attempt. Officials claim that Jackson had smuggled a 9mm pistol into the prison and he and nearly two dozen other prisoners were attempting to escape. During the conflict, three corrections officers and two other inmates were killed. Six of the inmates (known as the San Quentin Six) were later tried for their participation.

Susie Edwards, Perry and Sadie Miller, and O.C. and Addie Nolen, the parents of Cleveland Edwards, Alvin Miller and W.L. Nolen, respectively, eventually filed a $1.2 million damage suit against corrections officer Opie G. Miller for the deaths of their sons during the Soledad Prison shooting of January 13, 1970 (described above). Jet magazine reported in its May 22, 1975, edition that the families ultimately received a total of "$270,000 from the state of California after an all-white jury decided that eight prison employees had caused the inmates' deaths".

== See also ==
- Black August (film)
- List of homicides in California
- Prison reform
