= Black August (film) =

2007 U.S. biographical film

- DVD cover
- Directed by: Samm Styles
- Produced by: Tcinque Sampson
- Starring: Gary Dourdan; Darren Bridgett; Ezra Stanley "Big" Leroy Mobley; Don Williams
- Cinematography: Kev Robertson
- Edited by: Judd Flemming
- Music by: Juan "Uglyfingers" Blair
- Release date: 2007
- Running time: 116 minutes
- Country: United States
- Language: English

Black August is a 2007 drama film directed by Samm Styles and starring Gary Dourdan, Darren Bridgett, Ezra Stanley, "Big" Leroy Mobley, and Don Williams. It was produced by Tcinque Sampson. The film centers on the story of George Jackson's life.

== Plot ==
The movie covers the last 14 months of George Jackson's life as well as the conditions in California's prison industrial complex. George Jackson would spend 11 years incarcerated (7 of which were in solitary confinement) for a $70 gas station robbery crime in 1960. He was 18 years of age when the sentence of one year-to-life was handed down to him.

Black August encompasses the infamous Soledad Brothers case in which George Jackson, Fleeta Drumgo, and John Clucheette are accused of murdering a Soledad prison guard, in retaliation for the killing of three Black inmates involved in a fight with White inmates on an exercise yard in Soledad State Prison, Soledad, California. The film reflects on the general prison movement in the late 1960s and early 1970s, and the role the Black Panther Party would play in organizing both the outside communities as well as the Party's influence on prisoners across the country.

As a prison organizer, George was recruited by Black Panther Party founder Huey P. Newton to head the People's Army, a euphemism which would become synonymous with the name Black Guerrilla Family. The film points out the conspiratorial nature of occurrences, which surrounded the events of August 7, 1970, where Jackson's 17-year-old younger brother, Jonathan Jackson, played by Ezra J. Stanley, would be killed at the Marin County Courthouse, at San Rafael, California, during a hostage takeover attempt to leverage against the release of the elder Jackson, and the other Soledad Brothers.

The younger Jackson and three others would be killed, including Superior Judge Harold Haley and August 21, 1971, where George Jackson himself, and five others would be killed at San Quentin State Prison, California, during what is described as a prison break attempt. After a nationwide manhunt, Angela Davis would be captured and stand trial in connection with the Marin County Court House liberation attempt by Jonathan Jackson, accused of conspiracy in supplying 17-year-old Jonathan Jackson with the weapons used. George Jackson is accused of smuggling a 9mm pistol and extra clips concealed under an Afro-wig, into the prison cellblock following a visit by Attorney Stephen Bingham. Stephen Bingham would leave the country, not returning to face charges until 14 years later. Both Davis and Bingham would be acquitted. Others possibly involved in connection with the events of August 21, 1971 would never be questioned.

== Cast ==
- Gary Dourdan as George Jackson
- Darren Bridgett as David Dryer
- Ezra Stanley as Jonathan Jackson
- "Big" Leroy Mobley as Lumumba
- Don Williams as FBI Agent Walker
