= Luis Talamantez =

American writer, poet, and prisoner's rights activist

- Born: April 10, 1943 (age 83); Los Angeles, U.S.
- Occupations: Author; poet; activist

Luis Talamantez (born April 10, 1943) is an American writer, poet, and prisoner's rights activist. He gained widespread recognition in the 1970s as a member of the San Quentin Six, a group of men charged with inciting the riot which killed three guards and three inmates, including George Jackson. Talamantez published his poetry while incarcerated and is perhaps best known for his collection of poetry, titled Life Within the Heart Imprisoned.

Born in Los Angeles on April 10, 1943, Talamantez was arrested for a $130 robbery and sentenced to two life sentences when he was only 22 years old. While incarcerated in San Quentin, Talamantez took an active role educating and organizing Chicano prisoners. He claimed that this made him a target to the prison officials, who went so far as to try to frame him for assault, a charge which a jury dismissed.

In 1971, San Quentin officials charged Talamantez, along with Hugo Pinell, Willie Tate, Johnny Larry Spain, David Johnson, and Fleeta Drumgo, with participating in an August 21, 1971 escape attempt to free George Jackson, a co-founder of the Black Guerrilla Family. The escape attempt sparked a riot which left six people dead. The 16-month trial of the San Quentin Six was the longest in the state's history at the time and was dubbed "The Longest Trial" by Time magazine. Talamantez was found not guilty on all charges in 1971, and was released on parole on August 20, 1976. In 1985, Talamantez was reported to be "living in the south."

== Works ==
- Life Within the Heart Imprisoned: The Collected Poems of Luis Talamantez (Fidelity Printing, 1976). ASIN B0006CV9VQ

== See also ==
- List of Chicano poets
- Pinto (subculture)
