= Blood in My Eye (book) =

1972 book by George Jackson

- Author: George Jackson
- Genre: Political philosophy
- Publisher: Random House
- Publication date: January 1, 1972
- ISBN: 0933121237

Blood in My Eye is a book of political philosophy written by George Jackson, co-founder of the Black Guerrilla Family. Jackson finished writing the book only days before he was killed at San Quentin State Prison on August 21, 1971. The book was first published on January 1, 1972.

== Background ==
In 1961, George Jackson was sentenced to one year to life in San Quentin State Prison for armed robbery. In 1966, he befriended fellow inmate W. L. Nolen, who introduced Jackson to Marxist–Leninist political thought; this would later form the ideological basis of the Black Guerrilla Family. While incarcerated, Jackson educated himself on history, literature and Marxist economics.

Using a plastic typewriter, Jackson wrote many letters and political essays, which were subsequently edited and compiled for his books Soledad Brother: The Prison Letters of George Jackson and Blood in My Eye.

== Content ==
=== Overview ===
Blood in My Eye begins with the statement:

We must accept the eventuality of bringing the U.S.A. to its knees; accept the closing off of critical sections of the city with barbed wire, armored pig carriers crisscrossing the streets, soldiers everywhere, tommy guns pointed at stomach level, smoke curling black against the daylight sky, the smell of cordite, house-to-house searches, doors being kicked in, the commonness of death.

Jackson discusses various topics such as the use of guerrilla warfare against the U.S. government, class struggle and American fascism. The content is presented as a series of essays and letters. In the book, Jackson describes himself as a "Marxist-Leninist-Maoist-Fanonist".

=== Guerrilla warfare ===
Jackson devotes a large portion of the book to urban guerrilla warfare strategies to be used against the police and military. For example, he describes a makeshift armored vehicle which is equipped with flamethrowers, machine guns and rocket launchers. He attributes this idea to his brother Jonathan Jackson. Furthermore, he advocates for the assassination of reactionary leaders.

Jackson writes: "Our whole question is: just what level of consciousness will support the violent revolutionary activity necessary to achieve our ends? And how will we know when this level is reached? Recall: our Mao teaches that when revolution fails it isn't the fault of the people, it's the fault of the vanguard party. The people will never come to us and say, "Let's fight." There have never been any spontaneous revolutions. They were all staged, manufactured, by people who went to the head of the masses and directed them."

== Reception ==
Melvin Maddocks from Life described the book as "a remarkable portrait of a remarkable man". Maitland Zane from the San Francisco Chronicle described the book as "muscular, eloquent and poetically defiant". David Lewis of The New York Times criticised the book, claiming that it "lacks the visceral brilliance, the epistolary panache, and the sense of personal growth and complexity stamping the letters and essays in 'Soledad Brother'."
