= San Quentin Six =

American inmates who tried to escape in 1971

The San Quentin Six were six inmates—Fleeta Drumgo, David Johnson, Hugo Pinell, Johnny Spain, Willie Tate, and Luis Talamantez—at California's San Quentin State Prison who were charged with criminal actions related to an August 21, 1971, escape attempt and prison riot. The riot resulted in six deaths and at least two people seriously wounded. Among those killed was George Jackson, a co-founder of the Black Guerrilla Family and a famous author and radical prisoner.

During the attempted escape, which sparked a prison riot on the cellblock, Jackson had possession of a .38 caliber pistol, allegedly smuggled into San Quentin by his attorney Stephen Bingham. Immediately after the incident, Bingham fled the country for 13 years. He returned in 1984 to stand trial, and in 1986 he was acquitted. Bingham's defense team posited the theory that it was prison officials who arranged for Jackson to obtain a gun in the hope that he would be killed in the ensuing melee.

Besides Jackson, those killed in the altercation were guards Paul E. Krasenes, 52, Frank DeLeon, 44, and Jere P. Graham, 39, and inmates John Lynn, 29, and Ronald L. Kane, 28. Two other officers suffered serious injuries.

The trial of the San Quentin Six cost more than $2 million and lasted 16 months, which at the time was the longest trial in California history. Of the six defendants, one was convicted of murder, two were convicted of assault on correctional officers, and three were acquitted of all charges. Specifically, Johnny Spain was found guilty in the shooting deaths of guards Frank DeLeon and Jere Graham. Hugo Pinell was convicted of cutting the throats of guards Charles Breckenridge and Urbano Rubiaco, Jr., both of whom survived. David Johnson was convicted of assaulting Breckenridge. There were no convictions for the killings of Krasenes, Lynn, or Kane. Drumgo, Tate, and Talamantez were acquitted on all charges, which had included counts of murder, conspiracy, and assault.

== Riot of August 21, 1971 ==
Map of San Quentin Prison

The August 21, 1971 riot at San Quentin involved deadly fighting between two rival gangs, the Black Guerrilla Family and Mexican Mafia, and resulted in fatalities, injuries, and 26 captured prisoners in San Quentin's "Adjustment Center" (the term used for the maximum-security wing reserved for the most difficult prisoners). The other details about what happened that day are still disputed. Inmate Johnny Spain recalled saying there was only one fact people could agree on: "There was a gun introduced into the Adjustment Center on August 21."

The main points of contention were: how the gun got into Jackson's hands, the type of gun used, whether the riot was planned or not, and whether it was a diversion to facilitate an escape. Legal advisers and prison officials supplied various narratives as they struggled to explain what happened. According to the state's initial account, attorney Stephen Bingham and a female assistant arrived at San Quentin for a meeting with George Jackson at around 2:00 pm. The assistant handed a briefcase to Bingham when she was not permitted to enter the visiting room.

According to an Associated Press report, which was based on interviews with prison officials, a cursory search of Bingham's briefcase was performed, and the inspecting guard failed to examine a tape recorder in the briefcase. This report said the briefcase was returned to Bingham after he walked through a metal detector. In a San Francisco Chronicle article sourced from prison officials, Bingham's briefcase set off the metal detector. The Chronicle article said a corrections officer opened the briefcase and found a cassette tape recorder; he inspected its battery compartment to determine if it was functional. Prison officials later came to suspect that the working components of the recorder had been emptied to allow room to insert a handgun with its grip handle removed. Another account alleged that Jackson assembled the gun himself with smuggled parts. But most evidence suggests the gun was already intact when it was received in the prison.

After multiple revisions, authorities identified the gun used as a 9 mm Astra M-600 pistol. However, analysts said the 9 mm found next to Jackson's deceased body would have been too large to fit within Bingham's tape recorder, or under Jackson's cap. The Department of Corrections then said the weapon was a .38 caliber Llama Corto made by Spanish manufacturer Llama Firearms.

Along with the gun, it was believed that escape-related notes may have been secretly passed between Jackson and his attorney. After the uprising, prison officials reputedly found notes in Jackson's trouser pockets, one of which read, "Take the bullets out of the bag. Hurry and give me the piece in the bag and keep the bullets." Jackson's longtime friend and former Soledad State Prison cellmate James Carr said no such escape notes would be in Jackson's pockets because he knew any escape plotting was tantamount to suicide, and that in fact he had been "in fear of his life for the last couple of years ... he felt the guards were going to kill him."

Before his scheduled meeting with Bingham, Jackson was strip searched in the Adjustment Center, then escorted to the visiting room. He sat across from Bingham at a wooden table that lacked barriers between the two; they were intermittently observed by guards. Officials speculated that during this time, Bingham passed the gun to Jackson, who concealed it in his hair under a watch cap. The meeting lasted about 15 minutes. Around 2:35 pm, Jackson was escorted by Frank DeLeon back to the Adjustment Center, where another corrections officer performed a second search prior to returning Jackson to his cell. When that officer asked Jackson about what appeared to be a metal object in his hair, Jackson pulled the gun out, pointed it at the officers, and inserted a magazine. He purportedly shouted, "This is it!", and ordered all of the officers to lie face down on the floor. He ordered one officer to get up and activate a switch that opened all 34 cells on the first floor.

After Jackson had released the convicts, he repeatedly shouted, "The Dragon has come!" As calls for help went out, heavily armed California Highway Patrolmen and Marin County Sheriff's deputies raced to San Quentin, and also proceeded to block access roads to the prison. Jackson reportedly told the other convicts, "It's me they want", and ran, with pistol in hand, next to Johnny Spain into the prison "plaza". Jackson was immediately cut down from behind by rifle fire. The marksman shot him in the back, where the bullet allegedly ricocheted off his spine or pelvis and exited through his skull.

According to the Chronicle, an inmate slashed the neck of officer Charles Breckenridge and dragged him to Jackson's cell; Breckenridge survived. The bodies of officers Frank DeLeon and Paul Krasenes were thrown on top of him, as well as those of two white inmates (John Lynn and Ronald L. Kane). Sergeant Jere Graham was killed by inmates when he came to the Adjustment Center to pick up DeLeon for another assignment.

After the riot had ended, 26 captured prisoners in the Adjustment Center (referred to as the "AC 26") were forced to lie face down, strip naked, and were confined in handcuffs and shackles. In the riot's aftermath, the AC 26 said they were repeatedly threatened and beaten by guards. When Fleeta Drumgo and John Clutchette (the two surviving Soledad Brothers) appeared in court three days later, they were walking stiffly and covered in welts. The AC 26 delivered a petition to the press stating, "We, the undersigned, [are] each being held incommunicado.... [We are] suffering from both wounds and internal injuries inflicted upon our persons by known and unknown agents of [Warden] Louis S. Nelson." Luis Talamantez claimed that Adjustment Center lieutenant Richard Nelson had told them, "None of you will ever leave here alive."

== Trial ==
After months of pretrial motions and jury selection, the prosecution, led by District Attorney Jerry Herman, began its opening statement on July 28, 1975. Security in the Marin County Civic Center courtroom was extremely stringent. Throughout the proceedings, all of the San Quentin Six defendants were shackled with chains and leg irons bolted to the courtroom floor, except for Willie Tate who had been paroled in January 1975 and was free on $50,000 bail.

The prosecution argued that the riot was part of a conspiracy cooked up by radicals outside San Quentin who wanted Jackson freed. Defense Attorney Charles Garry said the state's escape theory was "garbage"; he insisted the Adjustment Center riot was a spontaneous "emotional upheaval", "a cesspool that overflowed that day", and was not a ruse to engineer an escape.

The defense proposed an alternate conspiracy theory, namely, prison and law enforcement officials had set up Jackson to be killed. The theory, as presented by surprise defense witness Louis Tackwood—a former agent provocateur for the Los Angeles Police Department (LAPD)—was that a 38‐caliber revolver was smuggled into Jackson's possession to lure him into a trap. Unbeknownst to him, the gun was inoperable. The expectation was that he and prisoners sympathetic to him (like the San Quentin Six defendants) would attempt an escape, and that a team of sharpshooters would be ready to assassinate Jackson and the others. This scenario was allegedly devised by the Criminal Conspiracy Section of the LAPD. The prosecution countered that the only conspiracy was the work of Jackson's radical associates who sought to help him violently break out of prison.

On August 12, 1976, after a 16-month trial and 24 days of deliberation, the Marin County jury of five men and seven women rendered their verdicts for six of the 46 felony counts. It required 45 minutes for Superior Court Judge Henry J. Broderick to read the verdicts. David Johnson was convicted of one count of felony assault on a guard; Hugo Pinell was convicted of two counts of felony assault on a guard; and Johnny Spain was convicted of two counts of first-degree murder and conspiracy to commit murder. The trial ended as the longest in California history, during which 23,000 pages of testimony were collected. In 1989, Spain's two murder convictions were reversed on appeal, as the decision to shackle him during the trial was held to have violated his rights and prejudiced the jury against him.

Historian Eric Cummins notes how it was a sign of the times in the mid-1970s—in the wake of the Watergate scandal and FBI COINTELPRO revelations—that the defense attorneys were able to argue with some success that law enforcement agencies had implemented a plan to assassinate a black political prisoner (George Jackson) and, in the process, had brought false charges against six other inmates. While the argument was not fully vindicated by the jury's verdicts, the trial of the San Quentin Six contributed to public distrust toward the state attorney general's office, the LAPD, and corrections officials. In an oft-cited quotation, author James Baldwin said, "No black person will ever believe that George Jackson died the way they tell us he did."

== San Quentin Six ==
=== Fleeta Drumgo ===
Fleeta Drumgo (1945 – November 26, 1979) was born to Inez Williams in Shreveport, Louisiana.

According to the Daily Review (Hayward, California), Drumgo moved to Los Angeles with his mother at the age of three. His childhood was difficult, and he had been in and out of juvenile detention homes since the age of 13. According to Fania Davis Jordan, sister of activist Angela Davis, Drumgo moved to Los Angeles at the age of 14 and got crosswise with the justice system. He was placed in the Preston School of Industry. After his release, he was arrested in a new incident, for attempted murder. He was convicted and sentenced to the Deuel Vocational Institution near Tracy, California.

Drumgo was later charged with the December 1966 burglary of a television and radio store in the Los Angeles suburb of South Gate. According to court documents, Drumgo initially admitted his involvement in the break-in after officers found him at the address of the registration of the getaway car used by his accomplice. In early 1967, he was convicted of first degree burglary after waiving a jury trial. He was referred to the California Youth Authority, but they ruled that he was "not capable of reformation under their discipline".

In September 1967, the court, pursuant to California Penal Code, reduced Drumgo's previous conviction to secondary burglary and sentenced him to six months to 15 years in state prison.

Jackson, Drumgo, and Clutchette were among the Soledad Brothers indicted for the 1970 killing of a correctional officer at Soledad State Prison. The trio gained national notoriety about this case after Jackson published his memoir Soledad Brother (1970). They were acquitted at trial in 1972. Twice charged and acquitted for the murder of prison guards, Drumgo was released from prison in August 1976. He had served nine years for the burglary charge.

According to Peter Collier and David Horowitz, Drumgo approached attorney Charles Garry two weeks after the May 1979 shooting of Fay Stender by alleged suspect Edward Brooks; he hoped to sell information he had regarding the attempted murder. Collier and Horowitz wrote: "[Drumgo] was a member of the Black Guerrilla Family, that he had known of the BGF's plans to shoot Fay two weeks before the event and that he was willing to sell information. He reappeared on several occasions, sometimes wearing a gun in his belt, and named a former prisonmate of Brooks as head of the BGF and the man who had ordered the shooting."

Drumgo was fatally shot in Oakland on November 26, 1979; he was living with Clutchette at the time. According to Oakland police, Drumgo had been shot by more than one weapon. Witnesses reported two men leaving the scene, one with a shotgun and one with a handgun. His killers were never caught. At his funeral, Drumgo was eulogized by Angela Davis as a "communist martyr".

=== David Johnson ===
David Johnson (born circa 1947) was serving a sentence for burglary of five years to life when the escape attempt occurred. During the resulting trial, guard Charles Breckenridge testified that Johnson had attempted to strangle him. On August 12, 1976, Johnson was convicted on one count of assault. He was released from prison in 1993.

=== Hugo Pinell ===
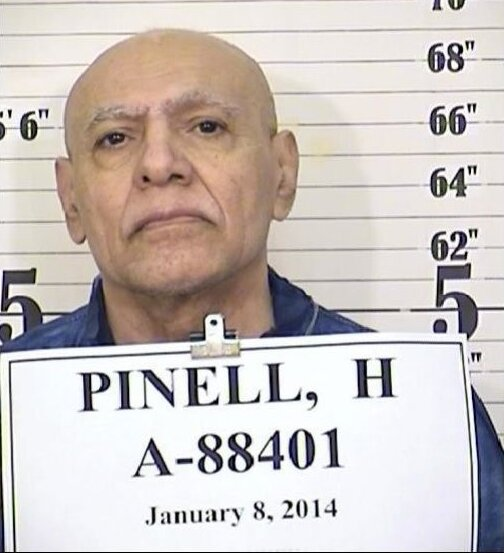
Pinell in 2014

Hugo Pinell was born March 10, 1945, in Nicaragua. His family immigrated to the US. He died in prison at age 70, after being stabbed on August 12, 2015, by two other inmates (members of the Aryan Brotherhood) at New Folsom Prison.

In 1965, Pinell was convicted of rape in San Francisco, sentenced to life imprisonment, and assigned to San Quentin State Prison. In 1968, he was convicted of attacking a guard and transferred to Folsom State Prison.

In June 1970, he was convicted of a similar assault and transferred to the Correctional Training Facility in Soledad, California. At Soledad, he was awaiting trial on charges of attacking another guard in December 1970. On March 3, 1971, Pinell fatally stabbed correctional officer Robert J. McCarthey at Soledad after luring him to his cell under the guise of needing a letter mailed. McCarthey died in Fort Ord Army Hospital two days later.

By the time of the trial for the uprising at San Quentin, Pinell was serving a life sentence for rape, and for three other violent offenses committed while in prison. Pinell was reported by a San Quentin spokesman to have been subdued by guards on March 26, 1975, after he stabbed his defense attorney, Lynn Carman, during a conference at the prison. Carman denied having been stabbed or wounded, and declined additional comment on the matter. One witness to the incident reported that Carman was left bleeding from the mouth.

During the trial, two San Quentin guards, Charles Breckenridge and Urbano Rubiaco, Jr., testified that Pinell had cut their throats. On August 12, 1976, Pinell was convicted of two counts of felony assault by a prisoner serving a sentence for life imprisonment. In 1985, he was serving his sentence in Folsom State Prison. In January 2009, Pinell lost his ninth bid for parole while at Pelican Bay State Prison in Crescent City, California. His prison term was extended by another 15 years.

On August 12, 2015, Pinell, aged 70, was killed in a prison riot at New Folsom Prison. Because of his repeated assaults on officers, he had been kept in solitary confinement for almost 45 years. He was returned to the general population two weeks before he was killed.

=== Johnny Spain ===
Johnny Larry Spain was born July 30, 1949, in Jackson, Mississippi, to Ann Armstrong, a white woman, and Arthur Cummings, a black man, from their extra-marital affair. He was originally named Larry Michael Armstrong, using the surname of his mother's husband, Fred Armstrong, a beer truck driver. While making a delivery to a nightclub in Utica, Mississippi, Fred Armstrong asked the black owner if she would adopt his six-year-old mixed-race boy. The woman said she could not, but contacted her husband's cousin in California, who agreed to do so. At the age of six, Spain was adopted by Johnny and Helen Spain in Los Angeles, and was renamed Johnny Larry Spain.

At the time of the escape attempt at San Quentin, Spain was serving a life sentence for robbery homicide. At 17, he had killed a robbery victim who resisted. Attorney Charles Garry opened his defense of Spain in the San Quentin Six trial with expert testimony from Philip Zimbardo, a Stanford University professor and psychologist.

On August 12, 1976, Spain was convicted of two counts of first-degree murder and conspiracy to commit murder in the deaths of guards Frank DeLeon and Jere P. Graham. He was the only one of the Six convicted of murder. The conviction was overturned on appeal by federal judge Thelton Henderson, because Spain had been shackled with 25-pound chains throughout the proceedings, which could have biased the jury against him.

After his conviction was overturned for murdering the two San Quentin guards, Spain continued to serve time at Vacaville for his prior robbery-homicide conviction. He was paroled in 1988 after serving a total of 21 years. He tried several jobs and finally found work in community relations in San Francisco. His daughter Sahara Sunday Spain, whom he had with photographer Elisabeth Sunday, became a poet who was profiled at age 9 in The New York Times.

Professor and author Lori Andrews published a biography about him: Black Power, White Blood: The Life and Times of Johnny Spain (1996).

=== Luis Talamantez ===
Luis Talamantez was born circa 1943. In February 1966, he was convicted of armed robbery in Los Angeles.

Talamantez was acquitted in 1971 of the murder charge related to San Quentin. He served 5 more years of his sentence for the 1966 armed robbery. After being released on parole on August 20, 1976, he was taken to a celebration party at the home of his primary defense attorney, Robert Carrow, in Marin County. In 1985, Talamantez was reported to be "living in the South".

=== Willie Tate ===
Willie Tate was born circa 1944 or 1945 in Selma, Alabama, where he lived until he was six years old. His father was a sergeant in the United States Army. The family moved to El Paso, Texas. However, Tate could not attend school as there was no kindergarten or first grade for black children. The family moved to California and settled in Fresno when he was about eight years old.

According to the San Francisco Bay Guardian, Tate was picked up as a runaway at the age of 14 and served 10 years in prison for "minor offenses".

On April 26, 1977, Tate was critically wounded after being shot by Earl Satcher, the leader of a group of ex-convicts called Tribal Thumb. In 1985, Tate was reported to be a "fugitive on a Fresno drug warrant".
