= Fleeta Drumgo =

American convict (1946–1979)

- Born: May 31, 1946; Shreveport, Louisiana, U.S.
- Died: November 24, 1979 (aged 33); Oakland, California, U.S.
- Cause of death: Gunshot wounds
- Other name: Comrade Fleeta
- Organization: Black Guerrilla Family

Fleeta Drumgo (May 31, 1946 – November 24, 1979) was an American convict and one of the Soledad Brothers, who were three African-American inmates accused of killing prison guard John Vincent Mills on January 16, 1970. Following this, Drumgo participated in an escape attempt from San Quentin Prison on August 21, 1971, which resulted in the deaths of three prison guards and three inmates, including George Jackson, who led the escape attempt.

In 1976, Drumgo was acquitted for both the murder of John Vincent Mills and for his role in the 1971 escape attempt from San Quentin Prison. After being released, he moved to the Bay Area, where he was murdered in 1979. While his killers were never apprehended, it is believed that Drumgo was murdered for trying to sell information to law enforcement regarding the shooting of Fay Stender, a lawyer who represented the Soledad Brothers.

== Early life and imprisonment ==
Drumgo was born on May 31, 1946, in Shreveport, Louisiana, and moved to Los Angeles at the age of 14. After moving to Los Angeles, Drumgo was placed in Preston School of Industry until 1963. Upon his release, he was arrested for attempted murder after Drumgo fired a shot at the ceiling during a fight with his stepfather. and was imprisoned until 1966.

During the early hours of December 16, 1966, Drumgo and an accomplice attempted to burglarize Martin's Radio Center in South Gate. However, the pair fled when a night watchman fired shots at them. The getaway car was tracked down to a woman's apartment where Drumgo was staying. After he was arrested, Drumgo was charged with second-degree burglary was given a six‐month to 15‐year sentence.

During his time at Soledad Prison, Drumgo became acquainted with George Jackson, who introduced Drumgo to communist ideology. Furthermore, Drumgo became a member of the Black Guerrilla Family, a Marxist-Leninist organisation which aimed to eradicate racism and overthrow the United States government.

== Murder of John Vincent Mills ==
On January 13, 1970, a new exercise yard was opened in the maximum security wing of Soledad Prison. Despite the racial tensions which existed between black and white inmates, the prison authorities allowed a group of black inmates to use the yard at the same time as a group of white inmates. A fight broke out between the black and white inmates, during which Opie G. Miller, a tower guard who had a reputation as an "expert marksman," fired four shots, which resulted in the deaths of three black inmates and the wounding of one white inmate.

Three days after the shooting, the Monterey County Grand Jury concluded that the killings were justifiable homicides. Within half an hour of the verdict being announced on the prison radio, a white prison guard named John Vincent Mills was beaten and thrown off a third-floor cell tier, which resulted in his death. On Mills' body, a note with the message "One down, two to go" was found.

On February 28, Drumgo, along with George Jackson and John Clutchette, were indicted by the Monterey County Grand Jury for first-degree murder. While awaiting trial, the three inmates were placed in the O-Wing of Soledad Prison, which was the maximum security wing of the prison.

== Escape attempt from San Quentin Prison ==
On August 21, 1971, George Jackson led an escape attempt from San Quentin Prison, where the Soledad Brothers had been transferred. During the early hours of the day, Jackson told Drumgo:

"Saturday, August 21, 1971. This is a day the motherfuckers will remember: the day we got the gun in"

Some time between 1:15pm and 1:20pm, Jackson went to a visiting room to meet Stephen Bingham, who was an investigator for Jackson's defense. With Bingham, there was a woman who gave her name as Vanitia Anderson on the prison visitor register. Anderson carried a briefcase containing a tape recorder, which she handed to Bingham, who took it to the visiting room. During this meeting, Jackson opened the tape recorder, in which a pistol was hidden. Jackson took the pistol and hid it under a wig, which Bingham brought with him.

After the meeting, Jackson was escorted back to the Adjustment Center by Officer Urbano Rubiaco, who noticed something sticking out of Jackson's wig. After Rubiaco reached towards Jackson, he jumped aside and pulled the pistol out of his wig. Taking Rubiaco hostage, Jackson forced him to flip a switch, which opened all the cell doors.

During the ensuing prison riot, Officers McCray and Krasenes were also taken hostage and forced to lie down. Drumgo kicked Krasenes in the face several times. During the riot, three guards and three inmates were killed, including George Jackson.

== Release and murder ==
Drumgo was released from prison on August 26, 1976, after being acquitted for his involvement in the escape attempt on August 21, 1971.

After his release, Drumgo moved to the Bay Area and had a difficult time adjusting to life outside of prison. He often asked others to pay his bills, and he stole from his friends. Drumgo seemed so depressed during this time that his attorney's assistant was worried that Drumgo wanted to commit suicide.

On May 28, 1979, Fay Stender, a lawyer who represented the Soledad Brothers, was shot in her home by a member of the Black Guerrilla Family, who accused Stender of betraying George Jackson and the prison movement. A week after the attempted murder of Stender, Drumgo approached his attorney, Charles Garry, and claimed that he knew of the plans to shoot Fay two weeks before it happened. Drumgo alleged that Hugo Pinell, who was also part of the San Quentin Six, ordered the shooting of Stender.

On November 24, 1979, Drumgo was shot dead in Oakland. While his killers were never apprehended, it is believed that Drumgo was murdered for trying to sell information to law enforcement.
