= Ruchell Magee =

American criminal (1939–2023)

Ruchell Cinque Magee (born Ruchell Lewis; 17 March 1939 – October 17, 2023) was an American man who spent most of his life in prison. He pled guilty to aggravated kidnapping in the August 7, 1970 Marin County Civic Center courthouse attacks in San Rafael, California. Judge Harold Haley was killed in that attack, as were all of those involved in taking him and other hostages from the courthouse, with the exception of Magee—the only black survivor of the event.

Born in rural Louisiana, when he was 16, Magee was convicted in 1955 of attempted rape of a 22-year-old white woman after a one-day trial, and sentenced to hard labor. Paroled in 1962, he moved to Los Angeles and was convicted in 1963 of kidnapping and robbery in an incident with his cousin that court records say involved a loaded gun, a moving car that had been reported stolen, and a $10 marijuana deal. Because of the prior rape conviction, he was sentenced to life imprisonment. While serving that sentence at San Quentin State Prison, he was a witness in court for another inmate and participated in the Marin Civic Center armed taking of hostages, which resulted in a second life sentence.

Magee was imprisoned almost continuously between the ages of 16 and 83, when he was released in 2023 under California's compassionate release law passed that year. He died 81 days later. Becoming a "jailhouse lawyer" in his quest to prove the kidnapping and robbery conviction was unjust, he was recognized as an activist and advocate for Black prisoners, as well as a vexatious litigant known for disruptive and abusive courtroom behavior.

== Early life ==
Magee was born "Ruchell Lewis" in 1939 in Franklinton, Louisiana; he was an African-American, in what was known as strong Ku Klux Klan territory. His mother was Elmar Lewis Magee, who died in 1972, and his father was Walter Lewis; he was their only child. His parents separated, and his father died young; Magee is the name of Ruchell's stepfather, Merkey Magee, who married Elmar in 1948 and adopted Ruchell.

Relatives report Ruchell being spoiled, threatening and demanding as a child. After failing two grades, he left primary school in the seventh grade, and was arrested for stealing $5 or $65 (accounts differ); Magee returned the money and no charges were filed.

== Incarceration ==
=== Louisiana attempted rape ===
Magee was charged in 1955, when he was 16, with aggravated attempted rape of a married 22-year-old white woman, Dorothy Corkern (later Dorothy Wood). Magee's aunt said they had been secretly seeing each other, Wood initially did not identify Magee in a lineup, and Magee stated in a 1963 probation report that they had been involved for six months when they were caught by a neighbor, which led to Wood's rape charge. Wood stated that Magee came to her door when she was still in her pajamas to ask if she needed her lawn mowed, and when she went back to bed, he had followed her there and threatened her. She identified Magee as her assailant later in the day when she was with her father.

The judge waived proceedings for Magee to be treated as a juvenile; Magee pled not guilty but was kept in jail between November 7, 1955, and February 6, 1956, when a jury of 12 white men found him guilty in one day. Before his 17th birthday, Magee was sentenced to 12 years of hard labor. The arresting deputy sheriff, A. R. Passman, stated in an interview: "I have no doubts ... whatsoever. I even think that nigger might have confessed to it." Magee maintained his innocence.

Magee was imprisoned in the Louisiana State Penitentiary—commonly known as "Angola" and described by The Los Angeles Times in 1972 as "a hellhole long reputed to be among the filthiest and most inhumane of Southern prisons". Relatives described him as a "hardened, rebellious", changed man after he was paroled in 1962. Released on the condition that he leave Louisiana, he moved shortly to Los Angeles to live with his aunt and uncle, Freddie and Beatrice Thomas. They reported observing unusual behaviors, characterized by the Los Angeles Times as "bordering on the psychotic" and considered Magee to be mentally ill. As his aunt pled for help, she said Magee began to keep company with a "bad crowd".

=== Los Angeles kidnapping and robbery ===
In 1963, Magee was arrested in Los Angeles following a fight with a musician in a traveling car that had been reported as stolen; the fight was purportedly over romantic jealousy and a $10 marijuana transaction (equivalent to $80 in 2025). Court records including allegations that Magee had a loaded gun; along with his cousin Leroy Stewart, he was charged with kidnapping and robbery. Magee accused the arresting officers of beating him.

Ben Brown, the black musician involved in the incident, stated at trial that Magee said, "That guy (Brown) is colored. I want to kill a white guy." During trial, Magee frequently interrupted court proceedings to proclaim his innocence, leading the presiding judge to have him gagged with towels. Magee's guilty verdict on both counts carried a mandatory life sentence because of his prior rape conviction. The guilty verdicts were reversed on appeal because charges pertaining to Stewart and Magee had been improperly combined; the statement by Brown that Magee "want[ed] to kill a white guy" became part of Magee's basis for believing he had an unfair trial. A retrial was held two years later, with Magee wearing a dog muzzle at the judge's instructions. Magee's court-appointed counsel entered a plea of not guilty by reason of insanity, which Magee disagreed with and felt was degrading. Magee also argued that the jury instructions were improper and the court stenographer had unlawfully altered the trial transcript. He was ultimately found guilty and sentenced to life in prison.

Magee's belief that the transcript from the first trial had an error, which he could not find a way to prove, became, according to the Los Angeles Times, the "dominant, overriding, all-consuming obsession of Magee's life"—much more so than the rape conviction. Magee also held that, over his objections, his attorney had unconstitutionally entered a plea on his behalf in the first trial; during his second trial, another attorney entered a plea of not guilty by reason of insanity, again over Magee's objection.

Though practically illiterate upon being incarcerated, Magee improved his literacy skills and became a "jailhouse lawyer", seeking to overturn his conviction and helping several other prisoners. Frustrated by his lack of success, he became convinced that his imprisonment was tantamount to slavery and that the criminal justice system in the United States was inherently racist. A friend described Magee to the Los Angeles Times as mistrustful of anyone "who hasn't been through what he's been through", including attorneys, judges and journalists, and trusting only other black convicts. He frequented the legal library at San Quentin State Prison often and avoided recreation, saying he could not be "rehabilitated" because he was innocent. Prison records paint a picture of him as threatening and obstinate, with 17 disciplinary notes in four years. Daniel Dewitt, who lived in the same block at San Quentin as Magee and later became the assistant director of a youth program in Oakland, California, described Magee as "talking law 24 hours a day".

=== Marin County Civic Center aggravated kidnapping ===
While serving his sentence at San Quentin, Magee and another prisoner, William Christmas, witnessed a fight between a guard and inmate James McClain in which the guard was stabbed. McClain was charged with assault, and Magee and Christmas were called to testify in his defense during proceedings at the Marin County Courthouse on August 7, 1970. According to the Los Angeles Times, Magee decided to testify due to his interest in law. Meanwhile, Jonathan P. Jackson plotted to use the proceedings as an opportunity to free his older brother, black activist George Jackson, and the Soledad Brothers, who were being held at Soledad State Prison and accused of murdering a correctional officer. Jackson aimed to take hostages during the trial and then demand the freedom of his brother and the Soledad group.

During Magee's testimony, Jackson produced firearms he had brought into the courtroom, distributed them, and enlisted McClain, Christmas, and Magee to help him. Magee reportedly told Jackson, "Get these chains off me, I'm a free man." Magee then left the courtroom to free other convicts held in a different area; two of those individuals did not participate in the subsequent events, while Magee forced a couple and their baby from the hall into the courtroom. After discussing which individuals to take, four kidnappers left with four hostages; with a shotgun at Haley's head, they attempted to exit in a rented van, when a gunfight erupted with local authorities, leaving Haley and three of the kidnappers dead and Magee and hostages—including attorney Gary W. Thomas—wounded. Magee was the only black survivor. He was taken to Marin General Hospital and had a bullet removed from his abdomen before being returned to San Quentin three days later.

Magee was the convict reported as holding the shotgun taped to Haley's head as the group left the Marin County Courthouse with hostages, and Thomas testified that he saw Magee kill Haley. Thomas also testified that, during the discussion of which hostages to take, Magee said "Let's not take any of them. Let's kill them all here." Magee's account is that Haley was killed by police bullets, and was dead before the shotgun went off, and that he was not there to take part in a kidnapping for ransom; he was there to expose prison treatment of blacks, and only joined McClain after a 15-minute speech to the jurors to that effect.

On September 4, Magee was indicted by a county grand jury for first degree murder—with regards to the death of Haley—and aggravated kidnapping. He was tried along with Angela Davis, who acknowledged she had purchased the guns used in the attack and knew the individual who brought them to the Marin courthouse. Magee was characterized by Michael Camp in a 2019 Journal of African American History article as having a "propensity for insulting judges and hamstringing proceedings with theatrics in court". Davis's and Magee's cases were initially conjoined before being severed so each could face separate proceedings in July 1971, after months of delay in which Davis was unable to enter a plea because of Magee's behavior. During these trials, Magee had to be chained in court as he screamed obscenities, was disruptive and abusive of the judge and even of his own attorney, and repeatedly interfered with Davis's defense by kicking and spitting on court participants. During a pre-trial hearing, after kicking his lawyer, Ernest W. Graves, in the face, Magee said that Davis's lawyer, Howard Moore Jr., "should be dead". At one point when he was removed from the courtroom by bailiffs, Magee stated, "I wouldn't mind returning with a gun, you dog", to the judge.

In his first trial, the jury acquitted Magee on two charges: kidnapping for extortion, and murder in the first degree. The jury was hung, and a mistrial declared, with one of the twelve jurors voting against second-degree murder, and one juror voting in favor of simple kidnapping. The 12-person jury had three black jurors, one of whom was the holdout. After the murder charges were dropped, Magee pled guilty to aggravated kidnapping, saying he was frustrated at not receiving justice and coerced into the plea. He lost an appeal to the State Supreme Court to withdraw his guilty plea, and was sentenced to life without parole.

=== Vexatious litigant ===
Magee was described in a 1987 Los Angeles Times article as the "most famous name" on a list of vexatious litigants "who must get approval from a judge before filing a lawsuit", after he filed 10 lawsuits in 1971, and more since 1984 that were ruled 'frivolous'.

=== Compassionate release ===
California Assembly Bill 960, known as the California compassionate release law, took effect on January 1, 2023, and allowed for Magee's release from prison in 2023.

Magee described himself in 2018 as the "longest held political prisoner in the world".

Magee died on October 17, 2023, only 81 days after his release from prison.

== Prison activism ==
According to author Dan Berger, Magee became an activist at San Quentin–"arguably the most vocal prisoner of the period"–using his knowledge of the law to focus on the cruel realities of prison life and advance the notion that prisons furthered and were a form of slavery. Berger writes that "Magee and his small but vocal collection of supporters" viewed him as a slave resisting bondage via open rebellion.

In a 2015 book review of Berger's Captive Nation: Black Prison Organizing in the Civil Rights Era, Lee Bernstein wrote that imprisoned activists including Magee developed support networks that facilitated the spread of "new analyses of the relationship between incarceration, racism, and state power". Bernstein argued that "placing a dog's muzzle over his mouth ... confirmed for Magee and others that their actions amounted to a slave revolt" and that these activists promoted a view that prisons served to "reinforce race and racism, much like slavery".

Magee adopted the name "Cinque" from the enslaved African Joseph Cinqué who led the famous 1839 slave revolt aboard La Amistad.
