= Steve Bingham =

Steve Bingham may refer to:

- Steve Bingham (bassist) (born 1949), English bass guitarist
- Stephen Bingham (born 1942), American attorney
- Steve Bingham (violinist), English violinist and conductor
