= Soledad Brother =

1970 prison memoir by George Jackson

Soledad Brother: The Prison Letters of George Jackson
- First edition cover
- Author: George Jackson
- Language: English
- Genre: Prison memoir
- Publisher: Coward-McCann
- Publication date: 1970
- Publication place: United States
- Media type: Print (hardcover, paperback)
- Pages: 330 pp
- ISBN: 0698103475

Soledad Brother: The Prison Letters of George Jackson is a collection of letters written by George Jackson while he was incarcerated in Soledad State Prison and San Quentin State Prison. In addition to containing autobiographical details from Jackson's life, the letters give a harsh appraisal of the American prison system, and express strong condemnation of racism and capitalism in the United States.

When the book was published on October 1, 1970, Jackson had already served nearly ten years (seven of them in some form of lock-up or isolation) for being an accessory to armed robbery of $71 from a Los Angeles gas station. He was nationally known at the time as one of the three "Soledad Brothers"—along with Fleeta Drumgo and John Clutchette—who were awaiting trial for the January 1970 murder of Soledad corrections officer John Vincent Mills.

The book was a bestseller and brought Jackson enthusiastic attention from other prison inmates and from leftist organizers and intellectuals in the U.S. and Europe. The French writer Jean Genet supplied an introduction to the book's first edition. Soledad Brother sold more than 400,000 copies and was reissued in 1994 by Lawrence Hill Books.

== Description ==
George Jackson dedicates Soledad Brother to his younger brother Jonathan (who had recently died while trying to free the Soledad Brothers); to his mother Georgia Bea; and to his close friend and political comrade Angela Davis. The first letter in the book is a lengthy autobiographical account that Jackson wrote at the request of his editor, Greg Armstrong, who wanted readers to have background information to better understand the subsequent letters to Jackson's family and friends.

The next section includes letters that Jackson wrote to his parents between June 1964 and December 1969. His correspondence with his father Robert reveals a running "conversation-argument" between a revolutionary son and a conservative father, which Suzannah Lessard characterized as "the struggle between two generations of black Americans—those who would cast their lot with the system despite its abuses and the spiritual cost, and those who find the black role in the society intolerable—worse than imprisonment, worse than death." At one point, Jackson writes:

You see, my father, we have been "educated" into an acceptance of our positions as national scapegraces. Our acceptance of the lie is consciously based on the supposition that peace can and must be preserved at any price. Blacks here in the U.S. apparently do not care how well they live, but are only concerned with how long they are able to live. This is odd indeed when considering that it is possible for us all to live well, but within the reach of no man to live long! My deepest and most sincerely felt sympathies go out to all of you who are not able to resolve your problems because of this fundamental lack of spirit. The morass of illusionment has claimed your souls completely. I do not care about the other millions of blacks here in the land of tears, their fate is of their own choosing; but because you and the others of our family have always been close to me whatever successes I wring from the eternal foe you will share. Until I do this I know it is expecting too much for you to be impressed with the ideals I put forward. It's always been this way I imagine. One has to be shown the fruits and feel the rewards of a new or different thing before perceiving its merits.

In the dozen letters to his lawyer Fay Stender, Jackson often describes prison conditions:

Men are brutalized by their environment – not the reverse. I gave you a good example of this when I saw you last. Where I am presently being held, they never allow us to leave our cell without first handcuffing us and belting or chaining the cuffs to our waists. This is preceded always by a very thorough skin search. A force of a dozen or more pigs can be expected to invade the row at any time searching and destroying personal effects. The attitude of the staff toward the convicts is both defensive and hostile. Until the convict gives in completely it will continue to be so. By giving in, I mean prostrating oneself at their feet. Only then does their attitude alter itself to one of paternalistic condescension. Most convicts don't dig this kind of relationship (though there are some who do love it).... One is confined to his cell 23½ hours a day. Overt racism exists unchecked. It is not a case of the pigs trying to stop the many racist attacks; they actively encourage them.

In another letter to Stender, he writes:

The cruelest aspect in the loss of one's freedom of movement is of course the necessity to repress the sex urge, but after ten years I have even learned to control my response to that stimulus (one thousand fingertip push-ups a day). I probably have the world's record on push-ups completed. So, if they would reach me now, across my many barricades, it must be with a bullet and it must be final.

Jackson's radical political views are expressed in several of the letters, for example:

I am an extremist. I call for extreme measures to solve extreme problems.... International capitalism cannot be destroyed without the extremes of struggle. The entire colonial world is watching the blacks inside the U.S., wondering and waiting for us to come to our senses.... We are on the inside. We are the only ones (besides the very small white minority left) who can get at the monster's heart without subjecting the world to nuclear fire. We have a momentous historical role to act out if we will. The whole world for all time in the future will love us and remember us as the righteous people who made it possible for the world to live on. If we fail through fear and lack of aggressive imagination, then the slaves of the future will curse us, as we sometimes curse those of yesterday. I don't want to die and leave a few sad songs and a hump in the ground as my only monument. I want to leave a world that is liberated from trash, pollution, racism, poverty nation-states, nation-state wars and armies, from pomp, bigotry, parochialism, a thousand different brands of untruth, and licentious usurious economics.

The letters frequently showcase Jackson's wide reading in literature, political philosophy, and history. For instance, he concludes a letter to his younger sister Frances by saying, "I must now start doing all that is humanly possible to get out of prison. I can see great ill forecast for me if I don't find some way to extract myself from these people's control." He then pours forth to her without line breaks the entirety of Claude McKay's 1919 sonnet "If We Must Die" before signing off:

"If we must die let it not be like hogs, hunted and pinned in an inglorious spot, while around us bark the mad and hungry dogs making their mock at our accursed lot; if we must die then let us nobly die, so that our precious blood may not be shed in vain. Then even the monsters we defy shall be constrained to honor us though dead. We kinsmen must meet the common foe, though far outnumbered, let us show us brave, and for their thousand blows, deal one death blow. What though before us lies the open grave, like men we'll face the murderous pack, pressed to the wall, dying, but fighting back." I don't mind dying but I'd like to have the opportunity to fight back. Take care. George

== Critical reception ==
In a New York Times book review, Julius Lester called Soledad Brother "the most important single volume from a black since The Autobiography of Malcolm X, and its impact among blacks may be even greater, particularly in light of the recent and growing number of rebellions inside prisons."

In her Washington Monthly review, Suzannah Lessard compared Soledad Brother to Eldridge Cleaver's bestselling prison memoir Soul on Ice (1968):

Cleaver's energetic negativism about the society and his pounding unqualified assertion of the black perspective make for a basically political book, a credo which is by nature limited and exclusive. Jackson is inclusive. He goes way beyond the circumstances—a black man persecuted by a white system—to the broader human predicament. Where Cleaver throws you back on yourself because you are not black, not oppressed—and that has its value—Jackson draws you in through your shared humanity and that, I think, has a far greater value.

== See also ==
- San Quentin Six
