= W.L. Nolen =

American convict who co-founded the Black Guerrilla Family

- Born: December 13, 1943
- Died: January 13, 1970 (aged 26); Soledad Prison, California
- Cause of death: Gunshot wounds
- Known for: Co-founder of the Black Guerrilla Family

W.L. Nolen (December 13, 1943 – January 13, 1970) was an American convict who co-founded the Black Guerrilla Family in San Quentin State Prison in 1966 along with George Jackson. Nolen is considered the mentor of Jackson and is often credited with introducing Jackson to radical left-wing politics.

On January 13, 1970, Nolen and two other black inmates were shot dead by a guard in Soledad Prison, during a fight between black and white inmates in the prison's new exercise yard. Nolen's death set off a chain of events within the California prison system, beginning with the retaliatory murder of a prison guard in Soledad Prison on January 16, 1970, which George Jackson and two other inmates were accused of. In the subsequent 19 months, 19 murders within the California prison system were directly linked with Nolen's death.

== Early life and imprisonment ==
Nolen grew up in Oakland, California, and was convicted of robbery in 1963. While imprisoned in San Quentin State Prison, Nolen met George Jackson in 1966, after Nolen was stabbed during a prison fight and went to the prison hospital, where Jackson was working as an orderly. During this initial meeting, Nolen introduced Jackson to the works of Franz Fanon, stating:

“He wrote two books you ought to read: Black Skin, White Masks, which is a study of black life in a white-dominated world; and Wretched of the Earth, which is his handbook for a revolution to produce a new breed of black man.”

During this initial meeting, Nolen stated that the initials "W.L." don't stand for anything. He explained that his family was from Arkansas, where including initials in front of one's name was common.

== Political activities ==
In 1966, Nolen co-founded the Black Guerrilla Family (BGF), in San Quentin State Prison, along with George Jackson. The BGF was founded on Marxist and Maoist ideology and had the goals of eradicating racism, maintaining dignity in prison, and overthrowing the U.S. government.

In 1969, Nolen and Jackson were transferred to Soledad Prison, where Nolen filed a petition against the prison authorities, in which he stated:

“Prison guards are complicit in fomenting racial strife by aiding white inmate confederates in ways not actionable in court, i.e., leaving cell doors open to endanger the lives of New Afrikans; placing fecal matter or broken glass in the food served to New Afrikans etc., as these material factors would be difficult to prove.”

In early January 1970, Nolen expressed concern to his parents that the guards in Soledad Prison were trying to kill him.

== Death and aftermath ==
On January 13, 1970, a new exercise yard was opened in the maximum-security wing of Soledad Prison. Despite the racial tensions which existed between black and white inmates, the prison authorities allowed a group of black inmates to use the yard at the same time as a group of white inmates. A fight broke out between the black and white inmates, during which, Opie G. Miller, a tower guard who had a reputation as an "expert marksman", fired four shots, which resulted in the deaths of Nolen, Alvin Miller, and Cleveland Edwards.

The death of Nolen set off a chain of events, which resulted in at least 40 murders within the California prison system, as outlined by Min S. Yee in a 1973 article:

“The murder of W.L. Nolen on January 13, 1970, began an incredible chain of tragedies that led the California prison system to disaster. The initial consequence [of Nolen’s murder] was the first killing of a guard in Soledad history, a revenge murder, and from there the poison spread. In the 19 months following the January 13 incident, at least 40 persons were murdered as a result of events and circumstances in the California prison system. Of the 40 murders, 19 are directly linked to the series of tragedies which began with the shooting of W.L. Nolen.”

== Depictions in media ==
- W.L. Nolen is portrayed in the film Black August (2007) by Leith M. Burke. In the film, a meeting between George Jackson and W.L. Nolen is portrayed, in which Nolen describes the Black Guerrilla Family as the “vanguard”.
