= Jonathan P. Jackson =

Black Panther Party member who attacked a California courtroom (1953–1970)

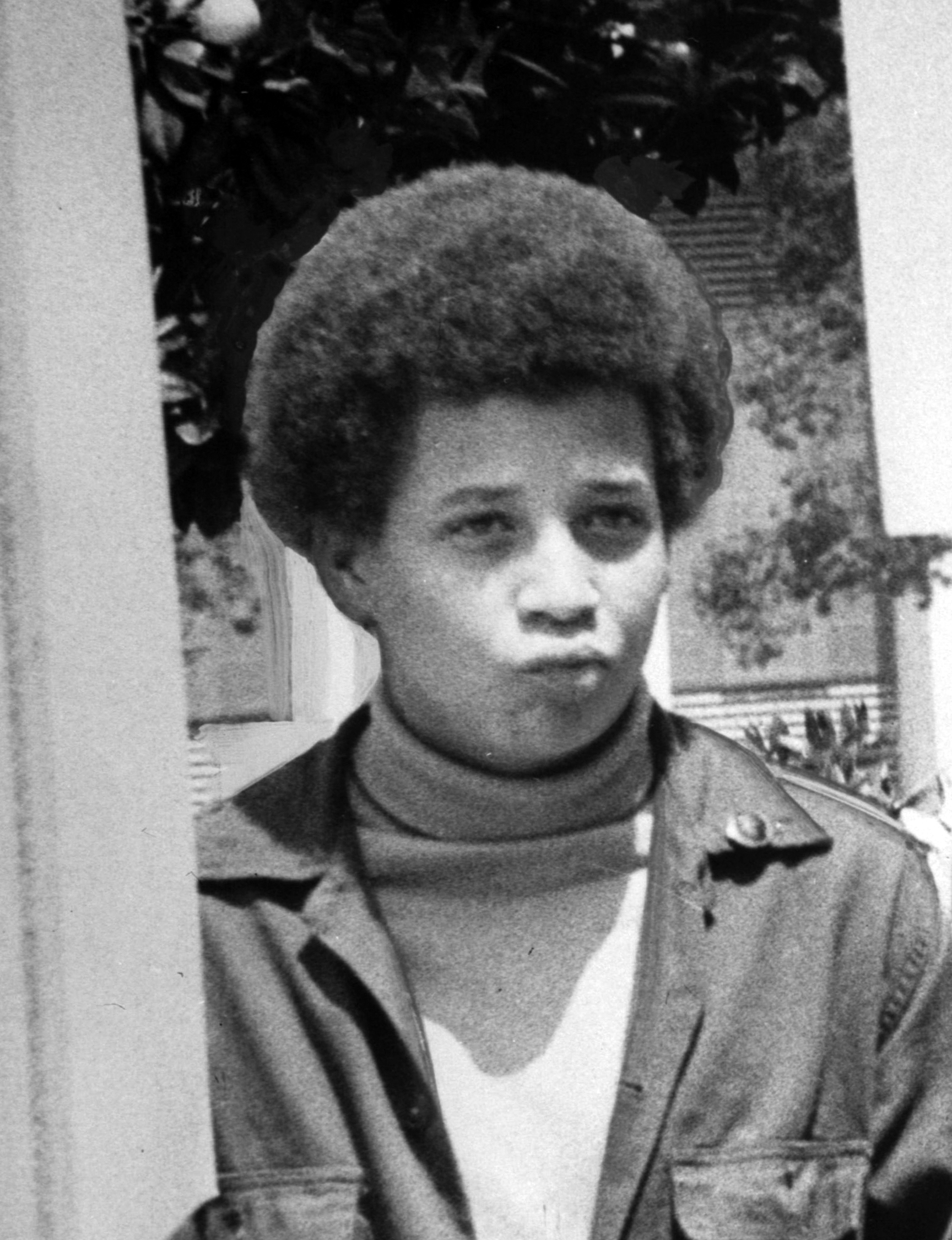
- Jackson during a protest in support of the Soledad Brothers
- Born: Jonathan Peter Jackson; June 23, 1953; United States
- Died: August 7, 1970 (aged 17); Marin County, California, U.S.
- Cause of death: Gunshot wounds
- Known for: Marin County courthouse incident
- Children: 1

Jonathan Peter Jackson (June 23, 1953 – August 7, 1970) was an American militant activist who died of gunshot wounds sustained during an armed invasion of the Marin County Civic Center. The action was initiated to demand the freedom of the jailed Soledad Brothers, including Jackson's brother George.

At age 17, Jackson overpowered a Marin County courtroom at gunpoint, taking Superior Court Judge Harold Haley, prosecutor Gary W. Thomas, and three jurors hostage. In the ensuing shootout, Jackson and Judge Haley were killed, along with two inmates already in the courtroom, who had readily joined the attack; prosecutor Thomas was paralyzed and one juror was seriously injured. The guns that Jackson used were registered to political activist Angela Davis, who at the time was leading the Soledad Brothers Defense Committee. Davis stood trial for alleged involvement in the courtroom raid and kidnapping and was acquitted of all charges in June 1972.

== Personal life ==
Jackson was the youngest of five children born to Lester Jackson and Georgia Bea Jackson. Raised in Pasadena, California, he attended St. Andrew's School from 1965 to 1967 for grades seven and eight, La Salle High School for ninth grade (1967–68), and then Blair High School for his junior school level study. Jackson worked closely with Angela Davis in the Soledad Brothers Committee, and Davis eventually considered Jackson to be like a blood brother.

== Political activism ==
=== Black Panthers ===
George Jackson's posthumously published 1972 book Blood in My Eye includes passages that he attributed to his younger brother Jonathan. These passages figure prominently in the development of the elder Jackson's theory of revolutionary praxis.

=== Soledad Brothers Defense Committee ===
Jonathan worked tirelessly to free the Soledad Brothers. Angela Davis said about him in her autobiography: "Jonathan only wanted to talk about George. All of his interests, all of his activities were bound up in some way with his brother in Soledad." George had recommended to Davis that Jonathan do work for the Soledad Brothers Defense Committee (SBDC). Jonathan was considered a talented writer and the committee was in need of good writers. Many of the materials produced by the SBDC were the result of Jonathan's efforts.

=== Marin County incident ===
On August 7, 1970, Jackson brought a satchel containing three firearms, registered to Davis, into the Marin County Hall of Justice, where Judge Haley was presiding over the trial of San Quentin inmate James McClain.

Once inside Judge Haley's courtroom, Jackson drew a revolver and, aided by McClain and Black Panther inmates Ruchell Cinque Magee and William Arthur Christmas, took Judge Haley as well as Deputy District Attorney Gary Thomas and three female jurors hostage.

They encouraged responding journalists to document their actions as they loaded the hostages into a rented van. Responding San Quentin prison guards fired on the van that Jackson was driving as they attempted to escape. During the shootout, Jonathan Jackson, Christmas, McClain, and Judge Haley were killed, while Magee and Deputy District Attorney Thomas were seriously injured.

Jackson's son, Jonathan Jackson Jr., was born eight and a half months after his father's death. A monument on the premises to Judge Haley was the target of a follow-up attack perpetrated by the Weather Underground terrorist network in October of the same year.

== Legacy ==
When George Jackson's book Soledad Brother was published in October 1970, it included a dedication to Jonathan:

To the Man-Child, Tall, evil, graceful, brighteyed, black man-child — Jonathan Peter Jackson — who died on August 7, 1970, courage in one hand, assault rifle in the other; my brother, comrade, friend — the true revolutionary, the black communist guerrilla in the highest state of development, he died on the trigger, scourge of the unrighteous, soldier of the people.

Jonathan Jackson Jr. wrote the foreword to the 1994 reissue of Soledad Brother.

In October 1975, the Marxist militant group Sam Melville-Jonathan Jackson Unit (later renamed the United Freedom Front) was founded.

=== Popular culture ===
==== Music ====
- Nas pays tribute to George and Jonathan Jackson in his song "Testify" from his untitled album.
- Hasan Salaam references to George and Jonathan Jackson in the song "Get High Riddum" on the album Tales of the Lost Tribe: Hidden Jewels (i.e. "I fight for my freedom like George and John Jackson").
- Dead Prez mentions Jonathan Jackson in the songs "I have a dream too" and "Over" from their mixtape "Revolutionary But Gangsta Grillz "
- Chris Iijima of the band, Yellow Pearl, wrote a song "Jonathan Jackson" on the album A Grain of Sand: Music for the Struggle by Asians in America.
- Hussein Fatal mentions George and Jonathan Jackson in the song "Dumpin'" on the posthumous 2Pac album Pac's Life.
- 2Pac's song Soulja's Story on his 2Pacalypse Now album is a reference to George and Jonathan Jackson.

==== Film ====
- The 2007 film Black August about Jackson's elder brother George also dramatizes the Marin County incident.
