= Soledad Brothers =

California inmates charged with murdering a prison guard

The Soledad Brothers were three African-American inmates charged with the murder of a prison guard, John Vincent Mills, at California's Soledad State Prison on January 16, 1970. George Jackson, Fleeta Drumgo, and John Clutchette were alleged to have murdered Mills in retaliation for the shooting deaths by another prison guard, Opie G. Miller, of three black inmates during a fight in the exercise yard on January 13. The killing of Mills occurred 30 minutes after Soledad prisoners learned that Miller had been cleared of wrongdoing by a grand jury.

The Soledad Brothers case became a leftist cause célèbre. A defense committee was organized on the three men's behalf, publicizing them as political prisoners. In August 1971, Jackson was shot and killed during an escape attempt from San Quentin State Prison. In March 1972, Drumgo and Clutchette were acquitted by a jury of Mills' murder.

== Soledad State Prison ==
In 1966, George Jackson met and befriended W. L. Nolen in San Quentin State Prison, where the pair co-founded the Marxist-Leninist Black Guerrilla Family (BGF). Later, the two men were transferred, along with Drumgo and Clutchette, to the Soledad Correctional Training Facility and housed in the "O" Wing, which was the maximum-security section reserved for the most difficult prisoners, and referred to by prison authorities as the "Adjustment Center". According to Jackson, in the "O" Wing:

The strongest hold out no more than a couple of weeks. It destroys the logical processes of the mind, a man's thoughts become completely disorganized. The noise, madness streaming from every throat, frustrated sounds from the bars, metallic sounds from the walls, the steel trays, the iron beds bolted to the wall, the hollow sounds from a cast-iron sink or toilet. The smells, the human waste thrown at us, unwashed bodies, the rotten food. When a white con leaves here he's ruined for life. No black leaves Max Row walking. Either he leaves on the meat wagon or he leaves crawling licking at the pig's feet.

In Jackson's letters from Soledad, he characterizes the attitude of the correctional officers toward the convicts as both defensive and hostile, apparently out of pure malevolence. His account of life at the prison would later be used to build support for the Soledad Brothers Defense Committee.

== Prison yard riot ==
On January 13, 1970, 17 inmates—roughly half of them black and the other half "virulently anti-black"—were skin-searched for weapons and then released into the "O" Wing exercise yard. It had been two months since they were last allowed outside. The black prisoners were ordered to the far end of the yard, while the white prisoners remained near the center. Officer Opie G. Miller, an expert marksman armed with a carbine, watched over the inmates from a guard tower 13 feet (4 m) above the yard. A fist fight between whites and blacks ensued, and Miller opened fire on the prisoners below. No warning shot was fired. Three black inmates were killed in the shooting: W. L. Nolen and Cleveland Edwards died instantly; Alvin Miller died in the prison hospital a few hours later. A white inmate, Billy D. Harris, was wounded in the groin by Miller's fourth shot. In a June 10, 1970 letter, Jackson described the scene as seeing three of his brothers "murdered [...] by a pig shooting from 30 feet above their heads with a military rifle."

Following the incident, thirteen black prisoners at Soledad began a hunger strike with the hope of spurring an investigation. On January 16, 1970, a Monterey County grand jury exonerated Miller with a ruling of "justifiable homicide". No black inmates were permitted to testify, including those who had been in the exercise yard during the shooting. Inmates at Soledad heard the grand jury's ruling on the prison radio. Thirty minutes later, prison guard John V. Mills was found dying in another maximum-security section, "Y" Wing (George Jackson's cellblock), having been beaten and thrown from a third-floor tier to the television room below. Mills was the first guard in Soledad's history to die in the line of duty. On February 14, 1970, after an investigation into his death by prison officials, George Lester Jackson, Fleeta Drumgo, and John Wesley Clutchette were indicted by a Monterey County grand jury for first-degree murder.

== Soledad Brothers Defense Committee ==
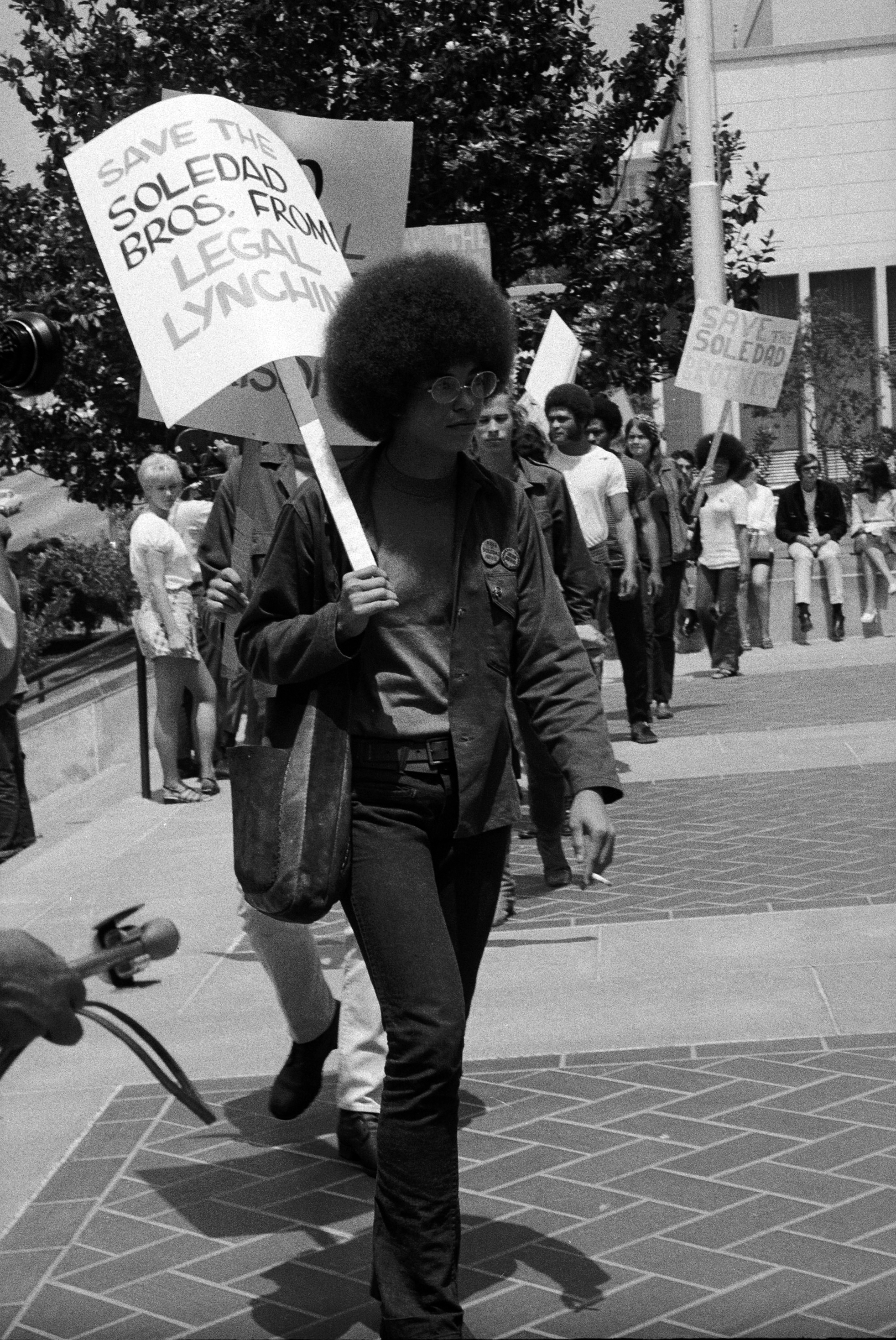
Angela Davis demonstrating for the Soledad Brothers, June 1970

The Soledad Brothers Defense Committee (SBDC) was formed by Fay Stender to publicize the case and raise funds for the legal defense of Jackson, Drumgo, and Clutchette, who were viewed by the Left as political prisoners. Among the celebrities, writers, and political activists who endorsed the SBDC were Julian Bond, Kay Boyle, Marlon Brando, Noam Chomsky, Angela Davis, Lawrence Ferlinghetti, Jane Fonda, Jean Genet, Allen Ginsberg, Tom Hayden, William Kunstler, Barbara McNair, Jessica Mitford, Linus Pauling, Pete Seeger, Terry Southern, and Benjamin Spock.

In early June 1970, California State Senator Mervyn Dymally and the California Legislative Black Caucus conducted their own investigation of Soledad State Prison, independent of the California Department of Corrections. The subsequent Black Caucus report on the treatment of Soledad prisoners (particularly in the "O" Wing) confirmed many of the SBDC's allegations of cruel and inhumane conditions, constant lock-up without time outside, contaminated food, lack of medical care, and racial harassment of black inmates by certain correctional officers. The report gave the SBDC "a new degree of legitimacy and respect". Public reaction to the report's findings was mixed. By mid-June 1970, Davis had increased her involvement in the SBDC and was now leading the movement to save the Soledad Brothers, who were facing the gas chamber if convicted. Stender meanwhile was arranging the publication of Soledad Brother: The Prison Letters of George Jackson, which would contain letters written by Jackson detailing his time in prison.

== Jonathan Jackson's attempt to free the Soledad Brothers ==
On August 7, 1970, George Jackson's 17-year-old brother Jonathan held up a Marin County Civic Center courtroom during the trial of prisoner James McClain, charged at the time with stabbing a Soledad guard. After having armed McClain, Jonathan Jackson temporarily freed three San Quentin prisoners, and took Superior Court Judge Harold Haley, Deputy District Attorney Gary Thomas, and three women on the jury hostage to secure the freedom of the "Soledad Brothers".

Jackson, McClain, Haley, and a prisoner named William Christmas were killed as they tried to drive away from the Marin County courthouse. Judge Haley died due to the discharge of a sawed-off shotgun that had been fastened to his neck with adhesive tape by the abductors. He also received a bullet in the chest which may have been fired from outside the van (evidence presented in Angela Davis's trial showed that either gunshot could have been fatal). Thomas, prisoner Ruchell Magee, and one of the jurors were wounded. The armed raid on the courthouse was viewed by some as indicative of a broader rebellion against the American prison system. Two days after Jonathan's death, George Jackson wrote a letter to his deceased brother, signing it:

Cold and calm though.
'All right, gentlemen, I'm taking over now.' (Note: The final words Jonathan Jackson used in the San Rafael courthouse.)
Revolution, George"

Angela Davis, who had purchased the guns used in the courthouse raid, was tried in 1972 on multiple charges—including murder, kidnapping, and criminal conspiracy—in connection with the Marin County incident. A jury found her not guilty on all charges.

== George Jackson's death ==
On August 21, 1971, days before the Soledad Brothers trial was set to start in the Mills murder case, George Jackson allegedly launched a riot and an escape attempt at San Quentin with a 9 mm pistol. There is controversy over the course of events that led to him obtaining the firearm. Stephen Bingham, who replaced Fay Stender (Note: Eight years after George Jackson's death, Fay Stender was shot in 1979, allegedly by a member of the Black Guerrilla Family for not supporting Jackson's militarist politics. She suffered severe injuries that led to her paralysis. Stender committed suicide in May, 1980.) as Jackson's attorney, had just visited his client. Prison officials claimed that Bingham smuggled Jackson an Afro wig with a pistol hidden inside. They further alleged that as Jackson walked back to his cell after meeting with Bingham, a prison guard noticed a gun protruding from Jackson's Afro and asked to see the object. Jackson's response was to pull the gun from his hair and release an entire floor of prisoners from the maximum-security wing while announcing, "This is it, gentlemen, the Dragon has come!"

In the melee that followed, three guards were killed—as were two prisoners suspected of being snitches—before Jackson rushed out into the yard where he was shot and killed by a guard. Other people involved in the case believe Jackson's death was a setup by prison authorities, who conspired to supply him with a gun in the hope that he would be killed in the melee, allegedly because they regarded his prison leadership as a threat to their control. Inconsistencies in the stories of eyewitnesses to the incident, although common in many crimes, fueled the controversy and helped to set off an uprising at Attica Correctional Facility in New York less than three weeks later. Bingham's acquittal in 1986 on charges that he smuggled Jackson a gun and a wig, and was thereby responsible for the escape attempt and murders, occurred after he emerged from hiding 13 years later to stand trial.

== Trial ==
In San Francisco, the trial for Mills's murder was held in the Department 21 courtroom on the third floor of the Hall of Justice, the same courtroom in which Ruchell Magee would later be tried on charges related to the murder of Judge Haley. Spectators, including the press, were separated from the proceedings by a $15,000 floor-to-ceiling barrier constructed of metal, wood, and bullet-proof glass. (Note: The barrier was also reported to be soundproof, thereby requiring a public address system so that spectators could hear the proceedings.) Throughout the trial, there were attempts to annul the proceedings on technicalities. There were complaints on behalf of the defendants that they were not properly informed of the original court hearing (a claim made by Jackson in a letter on June 13, 1970). The defendants also noted how the court reporter stated that he recorded 48 pages of testimony, yet they were only given pages 1–46. On March 27, 1972, seven months after Jackson's death, a San Francisco jury acquitted the two surviving Soledad Brothers—Drumgo and Clutchette—of the charges stemming from the murder of Mills. The jury said the state had failed to fully prove its case.
