= The Feminist on Cellblock Y =

- Directed by: Contessa Gayles
- Produced by: Contessa Gayles; Emma Lacey Bordeaux
- Cinematography: Contessa Gayles
- Production company: CNN
- Distributed by: CNNgo
- Release date: April 18, 2018
- Running time: 75 minutes
- Country: United States
- Language: English

The Feminist on Cellblock Y is an American documentary film directed by Contessa Gayles and produced with Emma Lacey-Bordeaux for CNN. The titular subject is Richie Reseda, an 25 year old man incarcerated at a prison in California who studies and organizes around feminism and toxic masculinity with his fellow young incarcerated men. The documentary premiered on CNNgo on April 18, 2018.

== Synopsis ==
The film follows a classroom of incarcerated men “as they wrestle with vulnerability and the confines of masculine norms through the lens of theorists such as bell hooks." Called Success Stories, the program is led by a 25 year-old then known as Richard "Richie" Edmond-Vargas, (now known as richie reseda). He teaches his fellow inmates about feminism and toxic masculinity at the Correctional Training Facility in Soledad, California. Richie's then-wife, Taina Vargas also appears in the film.

== Production ==
=== Background ===
CNN producer Emma Lacey-Bordeaux met Richard "Richie" Reseda (then known by the name Richard Edmond Vargas) in 2008 when he was a high school student who was suspended for publishing a V-Day issue of his school newspaper to bring attention to date rape on Valentine’s Day that included the schools text book image of the female anatomy on the cover. Lacey-Bordeaux read about the story in the Los Angeles Times and interviewed Reseda about the incident in her role as director of the radio station at Georgia State University. She reached out again in 2016 when seeking sources for a CNN story about criminal justice, and Reseda's wife notified her that he was incarcerated for two armed robberies on local Rite Aid pharmacies.

Reseda and Lacey-Bordeaux began to converse by phone. She and fellow CNN producer Contessa Gayles developed the idea for the documentary after sitting in on Edmond's weekly feminist education group, Success Stories.

=== Filming ===
The film was shot over several months and production worked around the correctional facility's regulations. It was directed and co-produced with Gayles, who also served as the cinematographer. The crew was small and consisted of Gayles, Lacey-Bordeaux, and sound mixer Eric Day.

=== Release ===
The Feminist on Cellblock Y was released on CNNgo on April 18, 2018.

== Awards ==
- Vera Institute of Justice, Best of Justice Reform Award, 2018
