= Gary W. Thomas =

American judge

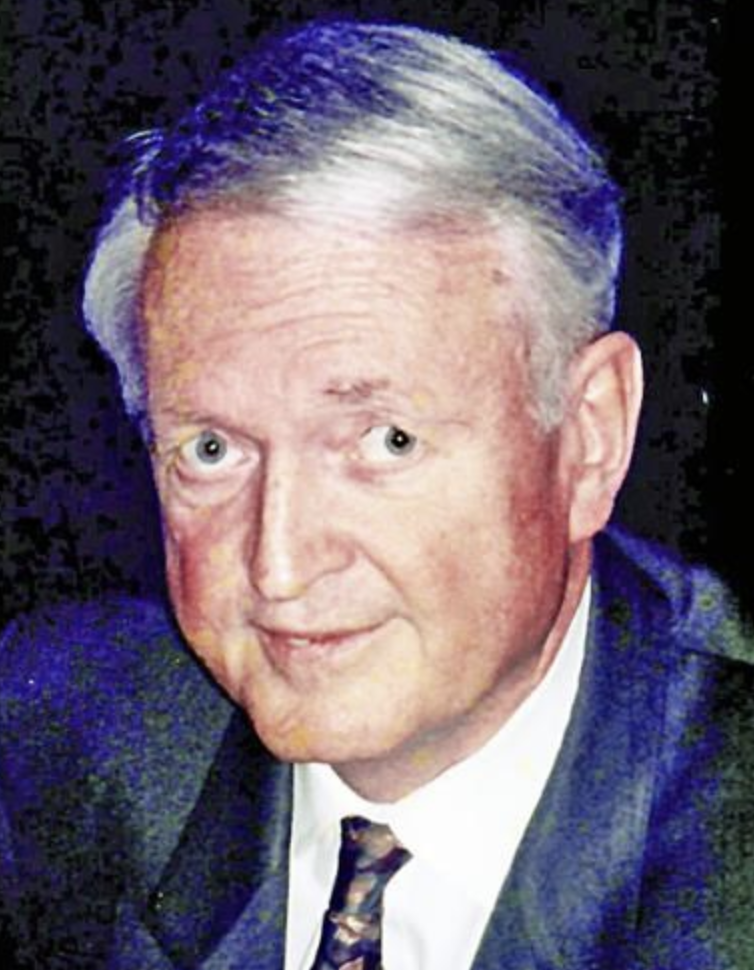
Judge Thomas

Gary W. Thomas (March 19, 1938 – April 3, 2017) was an American lawyer and Judge who served as a Marin County, California prosecutor and Superior Court judge. Thomas was primarily known for his role in the Marin County Civic Center shootout in which he was taken hostage in a courtroom, along with Judge Harold Haley and three female jurors, by Jonathan Jackson and three inmates from San Quentin State Prison in what is widely speculated to be a failed attempt to free his brother, George Jackson, and the other two Soledad Brothers. Haley, Jonathan Jackson, and two of the inmates were killed during the escape attempt, and Thomas was paralyzed from the waist down.

== Background ==
Thomas was a native of Great Falls, Montana. His father was James Walter Thomas and his step-mother was Vera T. Thomas. Thomas and his family moved to San Francisco, California when he was nine years old, but he frequently returned to Montana during the summers to work on his uncle's cattle ranch.

Thomas graduated from San Francisco's Riordan High School. After earning an academic scholarship to the University of San Francisco in 1955, he received a bachelor's degree in political science. Thomas received another scholarship and graduated from the University of San Francisco School of Law in 1961. He joined the State Bar of California in 1962, then worked in private practice and as a deputy county prosecutor until 1969 when he was promoted to assistant district attorney. Thomas was also a member of the United States Air Force Reserve from 1962 to 1968.

Thomas married Haley's niece, Maureen, around 1960. They were married for 57 years had two sons.

He was an avid fisherman.

== Marin County Civic Center shootout ==
On the morning of August 7, 1970, Thomas was an assistant district attorney for Marin County prosecuting the case of James McClain, an inmate at San Quentin prison who had been charged with assaulting a prison guard. Thomas was questioning Ruchell Magee, another inmate at San Quentin whom McClain had arranged to be a witness, when Jonathan P. Jackson interrupted the court proceedings. In the barrage of gunfire that followed during the escape attempt, Thomas was shot in the spine and paralyzed from the waist down. A ballistics expert would later testify that Thomas's spine was severed from a bullet fired from a San Quentin guard's .30 caliber carbine.

The following day, photographs of the perpetrators with their hostages, including Thomas, appeared on the front pages of newspapers around the nation. An initial report indicated that he was seriously wounded in the back. A UPI report released the day after the shooting indicated that Thomas was in grave condition with two bullet wounds in the chest. Another UPI report from the same day indicated that Thomas was wounded in the chest and spine and quoted him as telling District Attorney Bruce B. Bales that he grabbed a gun from the driver and shot three of the kidnappers. According to Bales, Thomas murmured to his wife: "Judge Haley was a saint. I got three of them."

Two days after the shootout, Thomas remained in critical condition at Marin General Hospital following surgery for bullet wounds in his back and was described as a "key witness in the question of who fired first in [the] gun battle".

Thomas was reportedly shot three times. In addition to the bullet that entered through his back and severed his spine, another nicked his heart and a third pierced his lungs.

Thomas was reportedly told by doctors that he would need 6 to 12 months to recuperate, however, he returned to work on September 14, 1970 - five weeks after the shooting. He claimed that his recovery was hastened by "vigorous exercise and the fear of boredom". The wheelchair-using district attorney was reported to avoid photographers and refuse interviews.

In December 1970, Thomas was credited as saving the lives of the three women jurors and named "peace officer of the year" by the Marin County Peace Officers Association.

In July 1971, Thomas' grand jury testimony from the previous fall was released. Questioned by Marin County District Attorney Bruce Bales, he indicated that it was Magee who shot Judge Haley.

=== Angela Davis trial ===
During the 1972 Angela Davis trial, Maria Elena Graham, one of the three women hostages, testified that Thomas told the gunmen "not to do anything foolish" but was forced to the floor with the others in the courtroom. Graham told of how Haley, Thomas, and the three jurors were wired together and forced out of the courthouse and into the escape van. She said that there, just prior to shots being fired, she heard Thomas shout: "For God's sake - don't shoot!" Graham reported that while she was sprawled on the floor of the van, Thomas reached over her head and grabbed a revolver from Jackson.

A few days later, the recently promoted Judge Thomas described Jackson's appearance and commented that he was holding a handgun. Thomas said: "The people in the courtroom, including myself and the guards, were instructed to get down on the floor. I got down on the floor where I was seated, stretched out." He reported that he kept his eyes on the bench and watched McClain approach Haley. Thomas said that McClain asked Jackson if he had brought the tape, then Jackson produced a carbine from under his raincoat while moving forward to hand the pistol to McClain. (Note: An AP report in the Anchorage Daily News commenting on Thomas' testimony suggests that Jackson pulled out a rifle before McClain asked him about the tape.) He went on to state that a shotgun was pulled from Jackson's bag, then taped around Haley's neck with the barrel under his chin. Thomas explained that McClain ordered Haley to call the sheriff and that McClain eventually told the sheriff: "We have the judge. If you don't do as we say, we'll kill him and the people on the jury."

According to Thomas, the gunmen spent several minutes discussing which hostages they should take with them. Thomas told the court that Magee said: "Let's not take any of them. Let's kill them all here." He quoted McClain has replying: "Cool it. Don't lose your cool." Thomas testified that while laying on the courtroom floor, he heard McClain say to the other gunmen: "We're not taking any kids."

In response to the prosecutor's questioning, Thomas said that he twice heard Jackson allude to a time element in their schedule. (Thomas described being tied to the three women hostages. - another reference states all five were tied together) As the gunmen and hostages gathered outside the getaway van, Thomas said he asked McClain to free the three women hostages but the inmate refused.

In describing the attempted getaway, Thomas outlined the position of the occupants in the van. Jackson was in the driver's seat, McClain was crouched on the floor beside him, Thomas was behind McClain, Haley was behind Thomas, and Christmas was in the back of the van. (Note: According to a UPI report in The Modesto Bee, McClain was in the front passenger's seat.) According to Thomas, the van came to a sudden stop and Jackson stuck his revolver outside the window. He reported that he heard either one shot or two shots in quick succession, then Jackson pulled his bloodied hand back into the van. Thomas testified that he immediately turned to Haley, under whose chin Magee held a sawed-off shotgun, and described how the right side of the judge's face appeared to slowly pull away from his skull. Thomas explained that he turned back towards Jackson, grabbed his gun from his hand, then fired a shot or two in his direction. He said he then shot McClain (who was also in the front of the van) in his back, turned and fired in the direction of William Christmas near the rear of the van, then finally shot Magee in the chest. Thomas reported that he attempted to shoot Magee again when the gun ran out of bullets.

Under cross-examination, Davis' attorney Leo Branton Jr. immediately drew from Thomas that he was not shot by Jackson or any of the three inmates. Branton also pointed out some minor inconsistencies in Thomas' story, and got him to admit that he could not tell which of the two identical .357 magnums on the table he had used. As Haley had also been hit by a .357 slug in the heart, Branton attempted to reconstruct the events within the van to show that Thomas accidentally shot the judge - and that his death throes caused the shotgun held by Magee to discharge. The ballistics expert would later demonstrate that Thomas shot who he said he shot and the .357 held by Christmas shot Haley. (Note: According to a UPI report in the Beaver County Times, Fred H. Wynbrandt, testified that McClain and Magee were hit by bullets fired from a gun belonging to Deputy David Mori.) Thomas would also testify that he did not hear any demand for the release of the Soledad Brothers.

Joseph J. Murphy, a San Quentin Prison sergeant, would testify that he removed a carbine that was "sticking up" and blocking access to Thomas.

=== Ruchell Magee trial ===
On January 22, 1973, Thomas would recount his story again in the trial of Ruchell Magee. Magee, who had been thrown out of every previous session of the trial, was reported to have sat quietly through Thomas' testimony while never taking his eyes off of him. According to Thomas, Magee shouted prior to the shooting, "Let's kill 'em all now", and that McClain had replied, "Let's cool it, keep your cool, everything's cool." He would again confirm that Magee was holding the sawed-off shotgun when it discharged and killed Haley.

On April 3, 1973, Superior Court Judge Morton R. Colvin declared a mistrial after the jury announced for the fifth time that it was deadlocked on reaching a verdict on charges of murder and kidnapping. One member of the jury, Hugh Chalmers, stated that the panel did not accept Thomas' testimony. Chalmers remarked: "We think that what happened in that van was not as the pain-ridden Mr. Thomas thought they happened. We feel that the judge was already dead when the shotgun went off. I think Mr. Thomas was honest, but I think his story was twisted."

Magee eventually pleaded guilty to aggravated kidnapping and was sentenced to life imprisonment.

== Professional career and judicial office ==
In 1971, Thomas successfully prosecuted a homeowner who rigged a .22 caliber pistol as a booby-trap that wounded a teenager burglar. The California Supreme Court later upheld the conviction of assault with a deadly weapon and ruled that a spring gun may not be used to defend a home against burglary. This ruling is frequently cited as an example of case law pertaining to self-defense.

During the course of the Davis and Magee trials, Thomas became a municipal court judge and later a California Superior Court judge who presided over a number of cases involving high-profile individuals.

=== Municipal court ===
Two years after the Marin County Civic Center shootout, California Governor Ronald Reagan appointed Thomas a municipal court judge. His role in municipal court was to handle misdemeanors, some civil suits, and the initial proceedings of felony cases. In 1973, Thomas ordered Glenn Yarbrough to pay $350 per month after the singer pleaded no contest to charges of failing to provide child support. Thomas received brief national publicity in 1975 for sentencing petty offenders to writing out thousands of times their promises not to violate various misdemeanor laws. He claimed that this type of punishment fit the crime and served as a good deterrent as the offenders would be jailed for hours at a time while completing their sentences.

Grace Slick, the lead singer of Jefferson Starship, appeared before Thomas in municipal court on multiple occasions in 1978. In March, Thomas imposed probation on Slick who had earlier been convicted of drunk driving. When arrested for public drunkenness three months later, she pleaded "no contest" to violating the terms of the probation. Thomas then sentenced Slick to two years probation, with the caveat that she would be jailed if she drank alcohol during that period. He also ordered her not to leave the state, and to attend Alcoholics Anonymous meetings for six months.

In 1982, Thomas accepted an innocent plea in municipal court from Phil Crane, a Republican member of the United States House of Representatives and a former U.S. presidential candidate, who had been charged with driving while intoxicated.

=== Superior court ===
Thomas was elected a superior court judge in 1986. As a Marin County Superior Court judge, Thomas presided over a 1987 jury trial in which Matthew Kelly, the founder of the rock band Kingfish, filed a $10 million lawsuit against Grateful Dead drummer Bill Kreutzmann. In 1991, Thomas set bail at $500,000 for pornography pioneer Jim Mitchell until he could stand trial for the shooting death of his brother, Artie Mitchell; Mitchell was also ordered to surrender his passport and remain in the Bay Area. In 1994, famed forensic psychiatrist Martin Blinder was sued by a former lover for "professional negligence, assault and battery, sexual abuse, and inflicting emotional distress." Later, when the woman repeatedly failed to appear in court, Thomas dismissed the suit and ordered her to pay $13,000 in costs.

As part of Church of Scientology v. Gerald Armstrong, Thomas presided over a legal dispute in 1995 between the Church of Scientology and Gerald Armstrong, a former member and employee of that organization. Armstrong had previously settled a civil suit against the COS for $800,000 with the stipulation that he would not divulge information he had gained as a church insider. Finding that Armstrong had violated the terms of the settlement, Thomas later ordered Armstrong to pay the COS $100,000 and issued an injunction ordering him to stop speaking about Scientology. Armstrong's refusal to comply with previous court rulings prompted Thomas in 1997 to issue a warrant for Armstrong's arrest that is still outstanding. In 2004, Armstrong would file a document in Marin County Superior Court asserting that Thomas conspired with the Church of Scientology against him to violate various Constitution Rights and that his orders were illegal.

As of 1995, Thomas was one of three judges who had been appointed by the Marin County Superior Court to specialize in California Environmental Quality Act cases.

== Retirement and death ==
Thomas retired from the bench in 1998. He died on April 3, 2017, aged 79, due to "natural causes". According to his wife, he had kidney problems, pneumonia, and other complications from his paralysis.
