= George Jackson (activist) =

American author and activist (1941–1971)

- Born: George Lester Jackson; September 23, 1941; Chicago, Illinois, U.S.
- Died: August 21, 1971 (aged 29); San Quentin, California, U.S.
- Cause of death: Gunshot wounds
- Resting place: Bethel Cemetery, Mount Vernon, Illinois
- Known for: Radical prison activism
- Notable work: Soledad Brother: The Prison Letters of George Jackson; Blood in My Eye
- Parent(s): Robert Lester Jackson; Georgia Bea Jackson
- Relatives: Jonathan P. Jackson (brother)

George Lester Jackson (September 23, 1941 – August 21, 1971) was an American author, prisoner, and revolutionary. While serving an indeterminate sentence for stealing $71 at gunpoint from a gas station in 1960, Jackson became involved in the Black power movement and founded a far-left prison gang, the Black Guerrilla Family.

In 1970, he was one of three prisoners dubbed the Soledad Brothers. They were charged with the murder at Soledad Prison of corrections officer John V. Mills, allegedly in retaliation for the shooting deaths of three black inmates by a white prison guard several days prior. Also in 1970, Jackson published Soledad Brother, a collection of his letters that comprised a combination autobiography and manifesto addressed primarily to a Black American audience, but which was embraced by radicals around the world. The book was a bestseller and earned Jackson international fame.

In August 1971, Jackson was killed by prison guards during an escape attempt at San Quentin State Prison. During the attempt, Jackson and other inmates took three guards and two inmates hostage, who were later found dead in Jackson's cell. Three other guards were wounded but survived. Jackson never went to trial for the Mills murder.

== Biography ==
Born in Chicago, Illinois, Jackson was the second of five children of Robert Lester and Georgia Bea Jackson. In a letter written in June of 1970, he recalled the following about his parents and early childhood:

My mother was a country girl from Harrisburg, Illinois. My father was born in East St. Louis, Illinois. They met in Chicago, and were living on Lake Street near Racine [Avenue] when I was born. It was in one of the oldest sections of Chicago, part ghetto residential, part factory. The el train passed a few yards from our front windows (the only windows really). There were factories across the street and garage shops on the bottom level of our flat. I felt right in the middle of things.

As a young teen, Jackson began getting into legal trouble while his family lived in the housing projects of Chicago. In the hope of placing his son in a better environment, Jackson's father transferred his U.S. Post Office job to Los Angeles in 1956. He and George drove cross-country and initially stayed in Watts, and then settled in Pasadena where the rest of the family joined them. The relocation to L.A. did not end George's clashes with the law. At age 15, he was sent to prison reformatory for driving without a license. He also had juvenile convictions for armed robbery, assault, and burglary, and spent two years in California Youth Authority correctional facilities.

=== Incarceration at San Quentin and Soledad ===
On September 18, 1960, five days before his 19th birthday, Jackson was arrested for participating with Robert Earl Young in the armed robbery at gunpoint of $71 (equivalent to $800 in 2026) from a Standard Oil service station in Los Angeles. In December 1960, Jackson pled guilty to second-degree robbery. The following January he was sentenced to one year to life in prison. The judge pointed to Jackson's previous arrests as justification for the harsh sentence. He would remain in prison until his death.

During his first years at San Quentin State Prison, Jackson involved himself in revolutionary activity. He was characterized by prison officials as egocentric and anti-social. In 1966, he befriended fellow inmate W. L. Nolen, who introduced him to Marxist, Leninist and Maoist political thought, which would later form the ideological basis of the Black Guerrilla Family. In speaking of his ideological transformation, Jackson remarked: "I met Marx, Lenin, Trotsky, Engels, and Mao when I entered prison and they redeemed me." In Blood in My Eye (1972), Jackson labeled himself a "Marxist-Leninist-Maoist-Fanonist".

As Jackson's disciplinary infractions grew, he spent more time in lock-up and solitary confinement. He developed into an autodidact who read extensively and studied political economy and radical theory. He also wrote many letters to family members, friends and supporters, which would later be edited and compiled into the books Soledad Brother: The Prison Letters of George Jackson, and the posthumously published Blood in My Eye. Soledad Brother was an instant bestseller and brought Jackson a great deal of attention from leftist organizers and intellectuals in the U.S. and Europe. He amassed prison followers, including some whites and Latinos in addition to other black inmates.

At the beginning of 1969, Jackson and Nolen were transferred from San Quentin to Soledad Prison. On January 13, 1970, corrections officer Opie G. Miller shot and killed Nolen and two other black prisoners (Cleveland Edwards and Alvin Miller) during a yard riot with members of the Aryan Brotherhood. Officer Miller, regarded as an expert marksman, was stationed in the guard tower overlooking the yard. His first three rifle shots killed the three black inmates; his fourth shot wounded a white inmate. After Nolen's death, Jackson became increasingly confrontational with corrections officials; he spoke often about the need to protect fellow inmates and take revenge on prison guards, employing what Jackson called "selective retaliatory violence".

On January 17, 1970, Jackson, Fleeta Drumgo, and John Clutchette were charged with murdering corrections officer John Vincent Mills, who was beaten and thrown from the third tier of Soledad's "Y" wing. This was a capital offense and a successful conviction would have put Jackson in the gas chamber. Mills was purportedly killed in retaliation for the recent shooting deaths by Officer Miller of the three black Soledad inmates, and for the fact that Miller was cleared earlier that day by a grand jury, which ruled that his actions during the prison fight constituted justifiable homicide.

Jackson, Drumgo, and Clutchette soon became known to the public as the "Soledad Brothers". Various political activists worked to exonerate the three men, who they viewed as political prisoners being punished based on their race. The activists also wanted to bring attention to the disproportionate rates at which people of color are incarcerated in the U.S., and to the socio-economic factors they felt had led to their imprisonment in the first place. Francis Carney describes how the fate of the Soledad Brothers grew into a leftist cause célèbre akin to the Scottsboro Boys in the 1930s:

The state's case against them [Soledad Brothers] seemed flimsy, trumped-up. Jackson and another Brother, Fleeta Drumgo, had been spreading radical ideas in the prison, were becoming heroes there. Had the state, fearing revolt in the prisons, tried to frame the Brothers, pin a flimsy murder rap on them, and execute them to get them out of the way and cow the inmates with their example? Thousands believed that this was so.

The Soledad Brothers Defense Committee was formed by activist attorney Fay Stender, who had edited Soledad Brother and arranged for its publication. Many famous writers and celebrities expressed their support for the committee. Among them was radical activist Angela Davis, who became committee co-chairperson and a close friend of Jackson. They corresponded frequently, and he sent her his manuscript for Soledad Brother, asking her to read it and help him improve it.

== Marin County courthouse incident ==
On August 7, 1970, George Jackson's 17-year-old brother Jonathan P. Jackson burst into a Marin County courtroom with an automatic weapon. He freed prisoners James McClain, William A. Christmas and Ruchell Magee, and took Judge Harold Haley, Deputy District Attorney Gary W. Thomas, and three jurors hostage to demand the release of the "Soledad Brothers". Police killed Jackson, Christmas and McClain as they attempted to drive away from the courthouse. Eyewitness testimony suggests Haley died as a result of a bullet discharged from a sawed-off shotgun, which had been fastened to his neck with adhesive tape by the abductors. Thomas, Magee and one of the jurors were wounded. The case made national headlines.

Angela Davis, who owned the weapons used in the hostage taking, was later acquitted of conspiracy, kidnapping, and murder. A possible explanation for the gun ownership connection is that Jonathan Jackson was her bodyguard. Magee, the sole survivor among the attackers, eventually pleaded guilty to aggravated kidnapping and was sentenced to life imprisonment in 1975. He was freed in 2023 under California's compassionate release law, which was expanded at the start of that year.

== Prison escape attempt and death ==
On August 21, 1971, Jackson met with attorney Stephen Bingham at San Quentin Prison to discuss a civil lawsuit which Jackson had filed against the California Department of Corrections. After the meeting, Jackson was being escorted by officer Urbano Rubiaco back to his cell when Rubiaco noticed a metallic object in Jackson's hair, later revealed to be a wig, and ordered him to remove it. Jackson then pulled a Spanish Astra 9 mm pistol from beneath the wig and said: "Gentlemen, the dragon has come"—a reference to Ho Chi Minh. It is unclear how Jackson obtained the gun. Bingham, who lived for 13 years as a fugitive before returning to the U.S. to face trial, was acquitted of charges that he smuggled the gun to Jackson during their meeting.

Jackson ordered Rubiaco to open all the cells and, with assistance from several other inmates, he overpowered the remaining corrections officers and took them, along with two inmates, hostage. A total of five hostages—officers Jere Graham, Frank DeLeon, and Paul Krasnes, and two white prisoners—were killed and found in Jackson's cell. Three other officers, Rubiaco, Kenneth McCray, and Charles Breckenridge, were shot and stabbed, but survived. After finding the keys to the Adjustment Center's exit, Jackson along with fellow inmate and close friend Johnny Spain escaped to the yard where Jackson was killed by a rifle shot that struck him in the back; the shot originated from a prison tower. Spain briefly tried to evade capture but then surrendered with only minor injuries.

In the aftermath of the abortive escape attempt, six inmates (dubbed the "San Quentin Six") were charged with multiple counts of murder, assault, and conspiracy. After a lengthy trial, three of the inmates were acquitted, and three (Johnny Spain, David Johnson, and Hugo Pinell) were convicted either for murder or for assaulting corrections officers.

There is some evidence that Jackson and his supporters on the outside had planned the San Quentin escape for several weeks. On August 18, 1971, Jackson rewrote his will, leaving his book royalties as well as control of his legal defense fund to the Black Panther Party (BPP). He had joined the BPP in 1969 after being impressed by the writings of its co-founder Huey P. Newton.

Shortly after Jackson's death, The New York Times reported that:

Mrs. Georgia Jackson, mother of the dead prisoner, raised a question that in some way the prison authorities had been responsible for Jackson's escape attempt and death. "I can tell you exactly what happened," Mrs. Jackson said. "They set him up to kill him and they killed him. They'd been trying for 10 and 1/2 years to do it and they did it." Warden [Louis S.] Nelson denied that any prison officer would have taken part in such a plan. He pointed out that the escape attempt had left three guards dead and three others wounded. "If it was set up, it was set up by people on the outside," the warden said. "He was victim of their and his beliefs."

In an opinion column published the next day, Tom Wicker acknowledged George Jackson as a "talented writer, a sensitive man, a potential leader and political thinker of great persuasiveness". But Wicker added that Mrs. Jackson's allegation about her son being murdered in a "set up" was symptomatic of "the view in the black ghetto, where authority—mostly white—is deeply mistrusted." As African-American author James Baldwin said, "No black person will ever believe that George Jackson died the way they tell us he did."

The fact that Jackson, a nationally known symbol of the radical prison movement, was killed by a gunshot wound in the back from a prison guard, provoked protests in jails and prisons throughout the U.S. On August 22, an estimated 700-800 inmates at Attica State Prison engaged in a one-day hunger strike to honor Jackson. His death has also been cited as a catalyst for the Attica prison uprising that took place less than three weeks later.

Jackson's funeral was held at St. Augustine's Episcopal Church in Oakland, California, on August 28, 1971.

== In popular culture ==
Several notable artists and entertainers have dedicated their work to Jackson's memory or created works based on his life. The avant-garde jazz group Art Ensemble of Chicago, affiliates of the Association for the Advancement of Creative Musicians, recorded and released the album A Jackson in Your House in Paris, France, in 1969. A non-album single was released by Bob Dylan, "George Jackson", about the life and death of Jackson. The song made the American charts peaking at No. 33 in January 1972. The ninth track of the 2011 Blue Scholars album Cinemetropolis is named for Jackson and references the Soledad Brothers.

Jackson and his attempted prison escape are the subjects of the first verse of the Joan Baez parody song, "Pull the Tregroes," on National Lampoon's 1972 album Radio Dinner.

Steel Pulse, an English reggae band from Birmingham, wrote a song titled "Uncle George" that contains a chorus of "Soledad Brother". The song appears on the band's album Tribute To The Martyrs (1979), which also honours other Black civil rights activists including Nelson Mandela, Martin Luther King Jr. and Steve Biko.

Jackson, along with Che Guevara and Malcolm X, is mentioned in spoken word dialogue on a cover version of The Temptations song "War" on the 1984 debut album Welcome to the Pleasuredome by the English band Frankie Goes to Hollywood. Impressionist Chris Barrie performed the spoken word sections of the cover version while impersonating the American President Ronald Reagan.

The 1994 song "Jettin'" by the hip hop trio Digable Planets references George Jackson as one of their black revolutionary heroes who died in prison.

Ja Rule named his 2003 album Blood in My Eye after Jackson's book. Saxophone player Archie Shepp dedicated most of his album Attica Blues (1972) to the story of George Jackson ("Blues for Brother George Jackson") and the Attica prison riots that followed.

Stephen Jay Gould wrote, in his 1981 book The Mismeasure of Man, of George Jackson's death in context of "statistically supported" social Darwinism. Quoting Gould about the legacy of failed science which supported racial bigotry and physiognomy: "George Jackson ... died under Lombroso's legacy, trying to escape after eleven years (eight and a half in solitary) of an indeterminate one-year-to-life sentence for stealing seventy dollars from a gas station."

Jackson's life, beliefs and ultimate fate were the topic of one of the many audio tapes recorded at the Jonestown commune in Guyana during 1978. In the tape in question, Jim Jones touches on several issues relating to Jackson, most notably Jones' firm belief that Jackson's death was a racist assassination. The tape reveals Jones' strong admiration for the Black Panther activist, as well as his disgust that a Jonestown follower like Willie Malone could think he was remotely in the same league as Jackson, and that it was "punks" like Malone who had sold Jackson out.

Stanley Williams dedicated his 1998 book Life in Prison in part to George Jackson. In Governor Arnold Schwarzenegger's response to Williams' appeal for clemency, the governor claimed that this dedication was "a significant indicator that Williams is not reformed and that he still sees violence and lawlessness as a legitimate means to address societal problems."

In the 2009 Chain and the Gang song Deathbed Confession Ian Svenonius lists George Jackson along with JFK, MLK, Malcolm X, Fred Hampton, Bobby Hutton, and "all the rest" as having been assassinated by reactionary US government agencies.

"Soulja's Story" is a song by rapper 2Pac (Tupac Shakur), released on the 1991 album 2pacalypse Now, which makes reference to the Marin County Civic Center attacks. Shakur was the son of Afeni Shakur and nephew of Black Power revolutionary and fugitive, Assata Shakur.

The 2007 film Black August is a retelling of the final 14 months of Jackson's life.

== See also ==
- San Quentin Six
- Soledad Brothers
- Fay Stender
