= Lawrence Rivera =

Lawrence John Rivera (born in 1971) is an American citizen, door-to-door salesman and convicted murderer who was sentenced to life imprisonment on March 11, 2011. He fled the United States before his capture in Amsterdam and Australia where he was arrested in August 2002. He fought extradition until 2008, when he was deported to the United States to face the charges.

In 2002, Rivera murdered his boss Kristina Garcia. Garcia's unburied body was found in the open desert near Yermo Cutoff Road on May 22, 2002, six days after her disappearance. U.S. authorities discovered Rivera had fled the U.S. in May 2002 after being questioned about the disappearance of Garcia. Rivera, who had a brief relationship with Garcia, fled to England, Germany, the Netherlands, and Australia, before he was arrested and extradited after years of appeals.

In December 2007, Rivera attacked guards, spat on TV crews and passengers, and attempted to flee from custody. Rivera was extracted from Australia by a team of eight U.S. Marshals and put on a private plane in 2008. Previously, the captain of the passenger plane refused to carry Rivera on board due to the safety concerns of other passengers. The Australian Nine Network reported that Rivera kicked out, swore, and threatened to kill his escorts. The marshals flew Rivera on a Learjet with a group of elite tactical response officers to return him to the U.S. Rivera reportedly was sedated during the flight.

Some documents written by Rivera during his years fighting extradition in Australia were used against him in his trial. While on the witness stand, Rivera said he "did not recognize or acknowledge" the documents, in which he wrote he did not acknowledge American law or authority. During his cross-examination, Deputy District Attorney Sean Daugherty said Rivera's entire testimony was suspect due to a lack of respect for American law.

Rivera served in the U.S. Army under the name of Lawrence J. Hale and was stationed in Hanau, Germany. He was suspected in the death of a 3-year-old girl in Germany in 1998. While never charged with that crime, Rivera served four years in a military prison for unrelated charges and was released in November 2001. He later returned to Barstow, California and murdered Garcia.

Rivera began dating a local national in Germany by the name of Danielle who had a young daughter from a previous relationship. Lawrence told many of his fellow service members that "she'd be perfect if it weren't for the damn kid". He killed the child while staying in the home of Danielle and her child.

Lawrence served 1–2 years in a U.S. Army prison in Mannheim, Germany, and was transferred to Ft. Knox. Kentucky to finish the remainder of his sentence. He then returned to California, changed his name and began working for Raytheon.
