= Fay Stender =

American lawyer and activist (1932–1980)

- Born: Fay Abrahams; March 29, 1932; San Francisco, California, U.S.
- Died: May 19, 1980 (aged 48); British Hong Kong
- Education: B.A. in English literature; J.D. in law
- Alma mater: Reed College; University of California, Berkeley; University of Chicago
- Occupation: Lawyer
- Known for: Prisoner rights activism
- Spouse: Marvin Stender
- Children: Neal and Oriane Stender

Fay Abrahams Stender (March 29, 1932 – May 19, 1980) was an American lawyer from the San Francisco Bay Area, and a prisoner rights activist. Some of her better-known clients included Black Panther leader Huey Newton, and the Soledad Brothers, including Black Guerrilla Family founder George Jackson.

== Soledad Brothers and George Jackson ==
In 1970, after Stender edited and arranged for Jackson's prison letters to be published as Soledad Brother: The Prison Letters of George Jackson, Jackson became a celebrity. Stender persuaded French intellectual Jean Genet to write an introduction, propelling the book to a best seller. The substantial proceeds from the book went to a legal defense fund that she set up. Stender eventually had a falling out with Jackson over his repeated requests that she smuggle weapons and explosives into the prison. Jackson was killed in 1971 during an attempted escape from San Quentin prison.

== Death and legacy ==
In 1979, Black Guerrilla Family member Edward Glenn Brooks, recently paroled, entered Stender's home in Berkeley, tied up her son, daughter, and her lover Joan Morris and shot Stender several times for what he said was Stender's betrayal of Jackson. Brooks forced Stender to state: "I, Fay Stender, admit I betrayed George Jackson and the prison movement when they needed me most" just before he shot her. Stender was left paralyzed below the waist; in constant pain from her injuries, she committed suicide in Hong Kong about a year later, after testifying against Brooks. Brooks was sentenced to 17 years' imprisonment for Stender's attempted murder in 1980.

The California Women Lawyers Association has an award dedicated to her memory. Established in 1982, the annual award is given to "a feminist attorney who, like Fay Stender, is committed to the representation of women, disadvantaged groups and unpopular causes, and whose courage, zest for life and demonstrated ability to effect change as a single individual make her a role model for women attorneys."

== See also ==
- Soledad Brothers
