= Harold Haley =

American judge and murder victim (1904–1970)

Harold Joseph Haley (November 14, 1904 – August 7, 1970) was an American judge. He was a Superior Court judge in Marin County, California. He was taken hostage in his courtroom, along with several others, during the course of a trial, and was killed during the attempted escape of his captors with their hostages.

== Background ==
Haley was born in San Rafael, California, and graduated from San Rafael High School. After receiving his law degree from the St. Ignatius College (later known as the University of San Francisco) in 1928, he served as a San Rafael city attorney and as a Marin County district attorney.

In 1956, Haley was appointed as a municipal court judge by California Governor Goodwin Knight; he was named to the superior court by Governor Pat Brown in 1965. While an assistant district attorney, Haley married his high school classmate, Gertrude Ahern (1904–2002), at Mission San Rafael Arcángel on May 24, 1933. The couple had three daughters. Haley's niece, Maureen, was married to former Marin County assistant district attorney and Superior Court judge Gary Thomas, who was left paralyzed in the shooting spree in which Haley was killed.

== Murder ==
On August 7, 1970, Jonathan Jackson brought guns into Judge Haley's courtroom, where San Quentin inmate James McClain was on trial. McClain was freed along with two other San Quentin inmates, Ruchell Magee and William Christmas, who were present at the trial as witnesses. Jackson and the prisoners took Haley, Thomas, and three female jurors hostage and attempted to escape.

Haley, Jackson, McClain and Christmas were killed as the abductors attempted to drive away from the courthouse. Haley was apparently hit by fire from a sawed-off shotgun that had been fastened to his neck with adhesive tape by the abductors. Magee was severely wounded, Thomas was shot in the spine and left paralyzed, and one of the female hostages was also wounded.

A ballistics expert would later testify that Haley was hit in the face by a shotgun blast fired within the van, as well as in the chest by a bullet from a .357 magnum that one of the gunmen had taken from a deputy.

On August 5, 1970, Angela Davis bought the shotgun used to murder Judge Harold Haley on August 7, 1970.

== Legacy ==
At the Marin County Civic Center, Judge Haley Drive and a memorial near the lagoon are named in his honor. The faculty of the University of San Francisco School of Law also awards the "Judge Harold J. Haley Award for exceptional distinction in scholarship, character, and activities". Notable alumni of the USF law school who have won the award include author Cupcake Brown, former United States federal judge Martin Jenkins, and a former mayor of Daly City, California, Sal Torres.
