= Stephen Bingham =

American lawyer

- Born: Stephen Mitchell Bingham; April 23, 1942 (age 84)
- Education: Yale University; University of California at Berkeley (JD)
- Occupation: Attorney (retired)
- Known for: Fugitive from justice (1971-1984) following an escape attempt at San Quentin State Prison by his client, George Jackson
- Spouses: Gretchen Spreckels (m. 1965; div. 1969) Françoise Blusseau (m. 1984)
- Children: 1 (deceased)
- Parent(s): Alfred Mitchell Bingham; Sylvia Doughty Knox Bingham

Stephen Mitchell Bingham (born April 23, 1942) is an inactive American legal services and civil rights attorney who, after being a fugitive from justice from 1971 to 1984, was tried and acquitted in 1986 for his alleged role in Black Panther George Jackson's attempted escape earlier from San Quentin State Prison in Marin County, California, in 1971.

== Early life and education ==
Stephen Bingham, the son of Alfred Mitchell Bingham and Sylvia Doughty Knox Bingham, was raised in Salem, Connecticut where he grew up among the state's wealthy class. His father was an author, attorney, and activist who was elected to the Connecticut State Senate as a New Deal Democrat in 1940 and served one term; he was also the editor and a founder of the left-leaning Common Sense. His grandfather, Hiram Bingham III was a governor and a U.S. Senator from Connecticut as well as the first European to see the ruins of Machu Picchu since the late-16th century conquistador Baltasar de Ocampo.

Bingham graduated from Milton Academy in 1960, where he was captain of the track team. He attended Yale University, where he participated on the freshman track and the varsity cross country teams. Bingham became involved in politics during his sophomore year, and was reportedly influenced by Allard Lowenstein. He was a member of the Yale Young Democrats and the Student Advisor Board, as well as the executive editor of the Yale Daily News. In 1964, he graduated from Yale with honors, and spent two months in Mileston, Mississippi as a volunteer in the Freedom Summer civil rights project.

Bingham decided to pursue a career in law and attended the University of California, Berkeley School of Law. During his first year, after a six-month relationship, he married Gretchen Spreckels, the granddaughter of Adolph B. Spreckels and whose family founded the Spreckels Sugar Company. The couple joined the Peace Corps and were assigned to Sierra Leone. After spending two years in West Africa with the Peace Corps, they returned to Berkeley in the fall of 1967 where Bingham resumed the study of law. In 1969, he received a J.D. degree from Berkeley. The couple divorced in May, 1969. He was admitted to the California bar in January 1970.

He marched for Cesar Chavez as well as with the Congress of Racial Equality in Mississippi, and Student Nonviolent Coordinating Committee he was an intern in the United States Congress and the United States Department of Justice, and he worked for Berkeley Neighborhood Legal Services. Bingham worked as part of a San Francisco Bay Area group that provided legal help to inmates. Bingham worked on Robert F. Kennedy's presidential campaign in 1968.

== Defendant in San Quentin case ==
Bingham was accused of concealing a pistol in a tape recorder and smuggling it to Jackson in San Quentin's Adjustment Center. On August 21, 1971, Jackson used a pistol, an Astra 9-mm semi-automatic, to take over his tier in the Adjustment Center. In the failed escape attempt, six people were killed, including Jackson, two fellow inmates and three prison guards.

Following the incident, Bingham fled to Philadelphia, before departing to Eastern Europe. Bingham eventually moved to France, where he attended film classes at the University of Paris. He also joined an artist collective that created documentaries about the country's agricultural workers. In total, he lived in Europe for 13 years. In 1974, Bingham was interviewed for The New York Times in an unknown Canadian city by a law school classmate. Afterwards, the FBI worked with the Royal Canadian Mounted Police in an attempt to locate him. In 1984, he returned to the United States and surrendered in San Francisco. He claimed that he had been framed due to his activism for Left-wing causes, including prison reform. He was reported to have "lived quietly in San Jose, California for six months" prior to surrendering.

On July 5, 1984, Bingham's attorney, Paul A. Harris, announced that Bingham would surrender "within a week." He surrendered on July 9 with the help of former United States Attorney General Ramsey Clark. According to Harris, government authorities set up Bingham as a scapegoat to deter other attorneys from assisting the "black radical movement." Bingham's father suggested that a woman, Vanita Anderson, who went with Bingham to San Quentin that day, but was never arrested or indicted, may have been involved in a plot to smuggle a weapon into the prison.

Georgia State Senator Julian Bond and writer Jessica Mitford were among those noted to have contributed financial or moral support to Bingham. Prior to the trial, he was defended by Leonard Weinglass.

Opening arguments in the trial were scheduled to begin on April 7, 1986.

As Time Magazine wrote at the time, "During a ten-week trial, Marin County prosecutors argued that Bingham's flight was proof of his guilt. Defense attorneys contended that prison guards had slipped Jackson the gun, hoping that the incendiary black militant would be killed. Bingham, they said, fled to save his life. "To understand this case," declared Bingham's lawyer M. Gerald Schwartzbach, "you have to understand 1971 . . . We're talking about a time when students were murdered at Kent State and Jackson State." A Marin County, California jury eventually acquitted him of murder and conspiracy charges at trial in 1986.

== Later life ==
While in Paris, Bingham met Francoise Blusseau whom he married after his surrender and before his trial. In April 1987, the couple had a daughter, Sylvia, who in 2009 was struck and killed by a truck while riding her bicycle to work in Cleveland.

Bingham was reported to have retained his "political activism" after the trial. After his release, he worked for an Oakland law firm handling pension litigation, was a member of Jesse Jackson's Rainbow Coalition, and supported a campaign to free Black Panther Elmer Pratt, who claimed he was also framed by the FBI.

Bingham worked at Bay Area Legal Aid in California, where he was a staff attorney in its San Francisco regional office specializing in welfare law issues. He remained an active member of the National Lawyers Guild, including serving as the president of a local chapter during the 1990s.

Bingham became an inactive member of the State Bar of California on January 15, 2015.
