= Correctional Training Facility =

State prison near Soledad, California

Correctional Training Facility (CTF)
- Interactive map of Correctional Training Facility (CTF)
- Location: Soledad, Monterey County, California, U.S.; 36°28′09″N 121°23′00″W
- Status: Operational
- Security class: Minimum–medium
- Capacity: 2,800
- Population: 3,927 (140.3% capacity) (January 31, 2023)
- Opened: 1946
- Managed by: California Department of Corrections and Rehabilitation
- Warden: Edward Borla

Correctional Training Facility (CTF), commonly referenced as Soledad State Prison, is a state prison located on U.S. Route 101 in Soledad, California, five miles (eight kilometers) north of the center of Soledad, adjacent to Salinas Valley State Prison.

== Facilities ==
Location of Soledad in Monterey County, and Monterey County in California

The institution is divided into three facilities: North Facility, Central Facility, and South Facility. All offer their own programs to the inmate/prisoner population. In March 2012, the facility's total population was 5,684, or more than 171.6 percent of its design capacity of 3,312.

As of July 31, 2022, Soledad was incarcerating people at 123.0% of its design capacity, with 4,761 occupants.

The South Facility dates back to 1946, when it was used as "Camp Center" and administered by San Quentin State Prison. In 1951, the Central Facility opened, and in 1958 the Northern Facility opened. By 1984, an additional dormitory was added to the Central Facility. Three more dormitories were added in 1996, two more to the Northern Facility and one to the Southern Facility. The Correctional Training Facility covers 680 acres (280 hectares). As of 2006–2007, there was total number of 1,643 staff and an annual budget of US$150 million.

On April 13, 2021, CDCR announced that the Southern Facility would close by July 2022 due to a decreased minimum security inmate population.

== Programming ==
The facility offers educational, vocational, volunteer, mental health, and self-help programming. Incarcerated individuals at Correctional Training Facility help train service dogs and have organized fundraising efforts to give back to their communities. Correctional Training Facility was the primary filming location for the CNN documentary, "The Feminist on Cellblock Y," which highlighted some of the rehabilitative and advocacy efforts of people incarcerated in CDCR.

Correctional Training Facility offers a dedicated Veterans housing and rehabilitation program for centralizing services for incarcerated Veterans. The Veterans hub is the first of its kind in the United States and has the capacity to house and treat up to 1200 Veterans.

== Officer deaths ==
Four correctional staff from the Correctional Training Facility have been killed while on duty: Officer John V. Mills, Officer William Shull, Officer Robert McCarthy and Program Administrator Kenneth Conant.

Most prominently, Officer Mills, a correctional officer on a maximum security unit, was beaten to death on January 16, 1970, in Y-Wing in retaliation of the killing of three inmates by another correctional officer during a riot in the Adjustment Center (O-Wing) a few days prior. A group of three prisoners, known as the Soledad Brothers, were later indicted for Mills's death and acquitted.

Six months later, on July 23, 1970, Officer Shull was stabbed to death with a shank fashioned from a sharpened steel file. on the North Facility recreation yard. He was discovered in an equipment shack with a multitude of stab wounds.

Officer McCarthy was murdered on March 4, 1971, while working in X-Wing, collecting mail from inmate Hugo Pinell at cell 104. As he opened the food port to collect the out going mail, Pinell stabbed McCarthy in the neck with a shank. The incident occurred on March 3, 1971; however Officer McCarthy succumbed to his injuries the following morning at a hospital located at Fort Ord in Seaside, California.

Program Administrator Conant was murdered on May 19, 1971, the last of the four killed in the line of duty.

== Notable inmates ==
- Bunchy Carter (1942–1969), activist; served four years in CTF for armed robbery
- Eldridge Cleaver (1935–1998), writer and political activist; served time for various crimes
- Juan Corona (1934–2019), serial killer; transferred to Corcoran State Prison in 1992
- Donald DeFreeze (1943–1974), leader of the Symbionese Liberation Army; transferred to CTF; escaped in 1973
- Jacob Delashmutt, one of several murderers of Elyse Pahler
- Fleeta Drumgo (1945–1979), one of the San Quentin Six; sentenced to CTF for burglary; was one of the "Soledad Brothers" convicted of murder; was released in 1976
- Nuestra Familia, criminal organization; formed in CTF
- Alex García (born 1961), boxer; served time in several prisons for involuntary manslaughter, including CTF
- John Keith Irwin (1929–2010), sociologist and criminologist; served 5 years at CTF for armed robbery
- George L. Jackson (1941–1971), activist; incarcerated for armed robbery; later charged with murder as one of the "Soledad brothers"; transferred back to and later died at San Quentin State Prison
- Hans Reiser (born 1963), computer programmer convicted of killing his wife; currently at California Health Care Facility.
- Mark Rogowski (As of 2020, RJ Donovan Correctional Facility, parole was granted December 10, 2019)
- Victor Salva, writer, director, producer
- Ricardo Sánchez (1941–1995), writer and activist; sentenced for stealing money; released in 1969
- Glen Sherley (1936–1978), imprisoned at several facilities for numerous crimes, including CTF
- Sirhan Sirhan (born 1944), the assassin of Robert F. Kennedy; held at CTF until 1992 Currently at Richard J. Donovan Correctional Facility.
- Danny Trejo (born 1944), actor and businessman; served time in several prisons, including CTF, for various crimes
- Dan White (1946–1985), politician and assassin; served five years of a seven-year sentence
- Randy Williams, father of social activist Mary L. Williams; served 7 years for assault with intent to murder
- Jaime Brugada Valdez (2000–2023), rapper known as MoneySign Suede; murdered in a shower at CTF while serving two years and eight months on two charges of being a convicted felon in possession of a gun
- Lawrence Rivera, so-called fleeing murderer; serving life. Rivera was denied parole for 5 years in October 2024

== Notable staff ==
- A. Theodore Eastman (1928-2018), prelate and bishop; served as CTF's chaplain from 1954–56
- Roscoe Pondexter (born 1952), former basketball player; worked as a guard at CTF before moving on to California State Prison, Corcoran
