= Black Guerrilla Family =

African-American prison and street gang

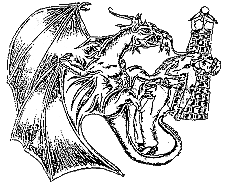
- Black Guerrilla Family logo, a reference to "The Dragon" George Jackson
- Founded: 1966; 60 years ago
- Founder: George Jackson
- Founding location: San Quentin State Prison, California, United States
- Years active: 1966–present
- Territory: California and Maryland
- Ethnicity: African American
- Membership (est.): 100–300 members Thousands of associates
- Activities: Drug trafficking, burglary and homicide
- Allies: Current: Black Disciples; Bloods; Crips; Dead Man Incorporated; El Rukn; KUMI 415; Norteños; Nuestra Familia; Historical: Black Liberation Army; Symbionese Liberation Army; Weather Underground
- Rivals: Aryan Brotherhood; Aryan Brotherhood of Texas; Mexican Mafia; Texas Syndicate

The Black Guerrilla Family (BGF), also known as the Black Gorilla Family, the Black Family, the Black Vanguard, and Jamaa is a black power prison gang, street gang, and Marxist-Leninist political organization in the United States founded in 1966 by George Jackson, George "Big Jake" Lewis, and W.L. Nolen while they were incarcerated at San Quentin State Prison in Marin County, California.

The group is recognized today as a dangerous prison gang that maintains a presence in both California and Maryland, often operating as a structured criminal entity rather than an active political insurgency.

== Philosophy and goals ==
The Black Guerrilla Family (BGF) was founded by George Jackson in San Quentin State Prison during the Black Power movement. Inspired by Marcus Garvey, the BGF characterizes itself as an ideological African-American Marxist–Leninist revolutionary organization composed of prisoners. It was founded with the stated goals of promoting black power, maintaining dignity in prison, and overthrowing the United States government. The BGF's ideological and economic aims, collectively known as "Jamaanomics", are laid out in the group's Black Book. The group has been described as one of the most politically oriented prison gangs.

== History ==
=== Fay Stender attempted murder ===
In 1979, former BGF lawyer Fay Stender was shot five times by recently paroled Black Guerrilla Family member Edward Glenn Brooks for Stender's alleged betrayal of George Jackson. Brooks forced Stender to state: "I, Fay Stender, admit I betrayed George Jackson and the prison movement when they needed me most" just before he shot her. Stender was left paralyzed below the waist by the assault and in constant pain. She committed suicide in Hong Kong shortly after she testified against Brooks. Brooks was sentenced to 17 years' imprisonment for Stender's attempted murder in 1980.

=== Huey P. Newton murder ===
On August 22, 1989, co-founder and leader of the Black Panther Party for Self Defense, Huey P. Newton was fatally shot outside 1456 9th St. in West Oakland by 25-year-old Black Guerrilla Family member Tyrone Robinson. Relations between Newton and factions within the Black Guerrilla Family had been strained for nearly two decades. Many former Black Panthers who became BGF members in jail were disenchanted with Newton for his perceived abandonment of imprisoned Black Panther Party members. In his book, Shadow of the Panther, Hugh Pearson alleges that Newton was addicted to crack cocaine, and his extortion of local BGF drug dealers to obtain free drugs added to their animosity.

Robinson was convicted of the murder in August 1991 and sentenced to 32 years for the crime.

=== Baltimore unrest ===
In 2015, Baltimore police stated that the Black Guerrilla Family, the Bloods, and the Crips were "teaming up" to target police officers. Later, however, leaders of both the Bloods and the Crips denied the allegations, released a video statement asking for calm and peaceful protest in the area, and joined with police and clergy to enforce the curfew. At one occasion, gang members helped to prevent a riot at the Security Square Mall by dispersing attempted rioters. A New York Times article reported that a self-identified Crips member named Charles claimed that he and members of the Bloods protected Black-owned stores and directed rioters toward Chinese and Arab owned stores. The claims that gangs protected some businesses received corroboration from reports, but the allegation about redirecting looters to Chinese and Arab owned stores was based on Charles's account and was later disputed by other gang members.

== Symbols ==
- Crossed sabres, machetes, rifles, shotguns with the letters (B G F) or (2.7.6.)
- A black dragon.

== See also ==
- Hugo Pinell
- Latin Kings
