= David Hilliard =

Black Panther Party leader (born 1942)

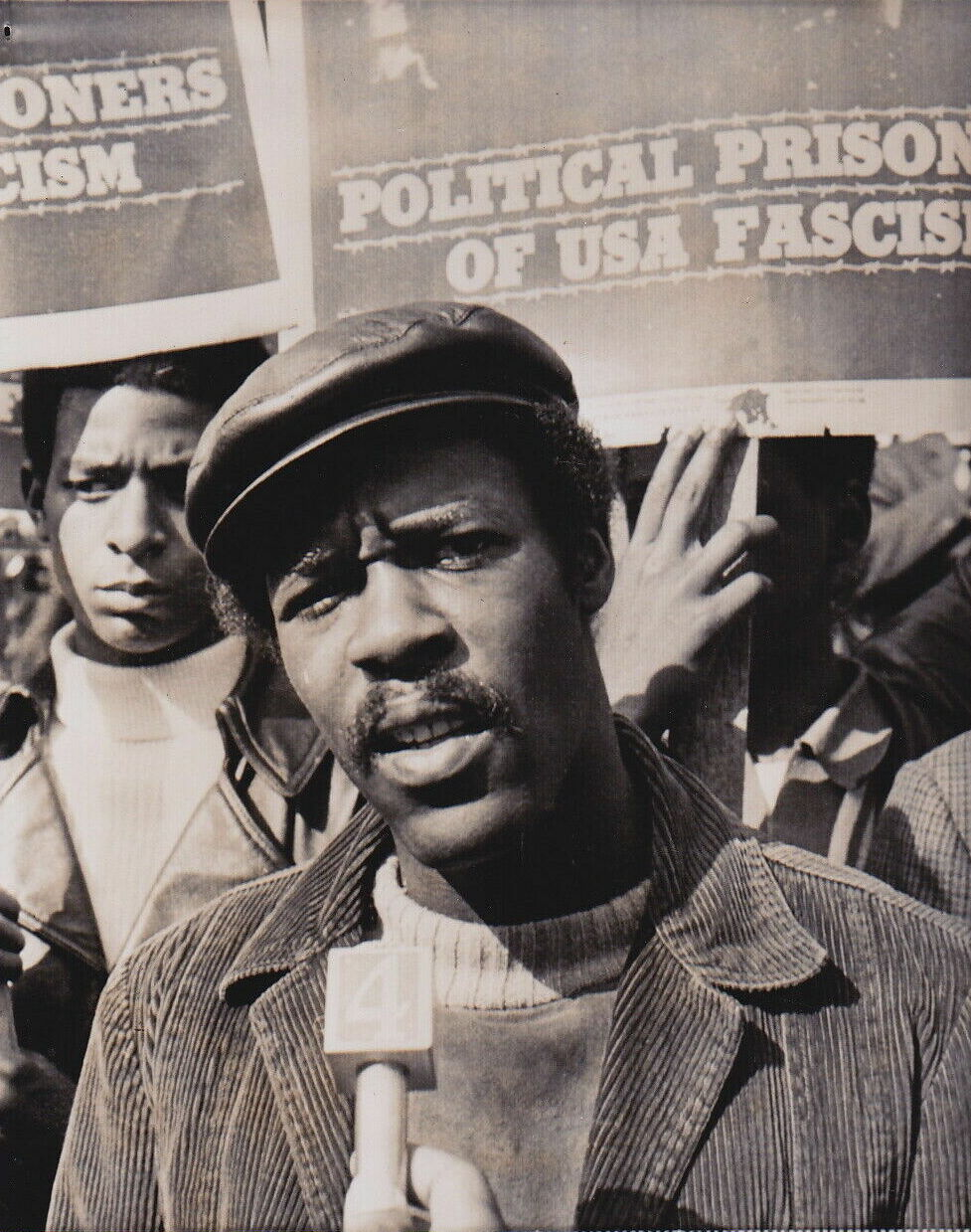
- Hilliard at a Black Panther rally in San Francisco, October 1969
- Born: May 15, 1942 (age 84); Rockville, Alabama, U.S.
- Spouse: Patricia (m. 1959)
- Children: 3

David Hilliard (born May 15, 1942) is a founding member of the Black Panther Party, having served as Chief of Staff. He would later go on to become a visiting instructor at the University of New Mexico in 2006. He also is the founder of the Dr. Huey P. Newton foundation.

== Early life ==
David Hilliard was born on May 15, 1942, in Rockville, Alabama, to Lela and Lee Hilliard. David had six brothers and five sisters: Theodore, Allen, Nathaniel, Van, Roosevelt, Arthur, Rose Lee, Sweetie, Dorty Mae, Vera Lee, and Eleanora. His parents met in 1916, when his mother was 16 years old, a little less than half the age of his father. In his childhood, Hilliard met Huey Newton, who would later become the leader of the Black Panther movement.

== Family life ==
David Hilliard married Patricia (Pat) Hilliard in 1959. They met at David's friend Melvin Newton's (Huey Newton’s) fraternity party. Pat initially resisted David advances, as she was still in a relationship with her first child (Dennis) father, but she eventually agreed to date David. At the age of 17, David and Patricia discovered that she was pregnant with their first child together, Patrice; this event led to David to dropping out of high school to provide for his family. David and Patricia then proceeded to get married at Berkeley City Hall in Berkeley, CA.

David, due to his early exit from high-school and not acquiring his diploma, had a hard time securing work due to his limited skillset. He would eventually perform many odd jobs to provide for his newly established family, such as cleaning up after skilled laborers, working as a tile chipper, working at canneries, and working as a car salesman.

David and Patricia Hilliard would go on to have three children: Patrice, Darryl, and Dorion. They named their daughter after Patrice Munsel, one of David's favorite singers. Dorion was named after Dorian Gray, the main character in Oscar Wilde's famous novel The Picture of Dorian Gray.

During their early married life, David faced the challenge of alcohol addiction and a lack of anger management.

During his involvement with the Black Panther Party, David’s act of infidelity would lead to him having an intimate relationship outside his marriage with a female member in the organization producing a daughter named Dassine.

== Work in the Black Panthers ==
Hilliard became involved in the Black Panther movement in 1966 while living in Oakland, California. Huey P. Newton, Hilliard's childhood friend, informed him of this organization that Bobby Seale and he were founding. This organization believed in defense of minority groups by any means necessary and followed a 10-point plan outlining "What We Want" and "What We Believe." Early actions of the Black Panthers involved intercepting in police brutalities through using arms to enforce police rules of conduct.

After the arrest of Huey Newton on October 28, 1967, for an armed scuffle with the Oakland Police resulting in the death of Officer John Frey, David Hilliard acted as the interim leader of the Black Panther Party. Hilliard helped to then organize a rally in February 1968 with his wife Patricia and older brother Rosevelt “June” Hilliard supporting him, called the "Free Huey Rally", that drew 6,000 people.

== Programs organized with the Black Panthers ==
Hilliard was involved in the many programs organized by the Black Panther Party. The Black Panthers organized programs called survival programs including: breakfast programs for school children, health clinics, and programs for prisoners. These programs were called survival programs because they simply help communities survive rather than addressing the systemic reasons behind these problems. These programs were free to those in need.

In 1971, under Hilliard’s leadership the Black Panther Party formed the Intercommunal Youth Institute which he and Patricia along with his brother children would become some of the school’s first students. This program addressed the systematic oppression of African American students in the public school system. The Black Panther Party believed that public schools failed to teach analytical skills that are necessary to survive in society. This school for children in Oakland taught children to analyze and criticize and respond with creative solutions.

Free Health Care was provided to people who could not afford the cost of public health care through the People's Free Medical Research Health Clinics. These clinics provided service ranging from testing for sickle cell anemia to providing references and rides to outside experts.

Other programs that Hilliard helped organize included: a community learning center, after school programs, escorts to protect the elderly, and free clothing programs.

== Influences ==
After reading Malcolm X's autobiography as a teenager, David Hilliard had a deep respect for his militancy. Although he admired the charisma of Martin Luther King Jr. he did not agree with MLK's advocacy for non-violent resistance. In his early teen years, Hilliard had little involvement in politics. In the summer of 1965, his nephew Bojack participated in the riots in the Watts neighborhood of Los Angeles, California. Seeing his nephew on TV inspired Hilliard to learn more about activism and politics.

Fellow Black Panther Party member and BPP Central Committee member Donald L. Cox has suggested that during Hilliard's stint as BPP Chief of Staff, Hilliard became an autocrat highly influenced by Stalin. Cox has stated that as the party explored Marxist theory, Marxist-Leninism became the party line and that in particular Stalin's book Foundations of Leninism was read and practised. Reflecting those principles, Cox alleges that Hilliard began to place loyalty to the party above all and dealt out punishment, denouncement or expulsion from the Black Panther Party to those who opposed him or the party line, even for the slightest of offence, with his orders being carried out by internal enforcers known as the "Black Guard" and "Buddha Samurai". Simultaneously, Cox says, Hilliard dismantled the power and authority of all other members of the Black Panther's central committee aside from himself, and that of Huey Newton, in a vicious drive for power.

== Hilliard's arrests ==
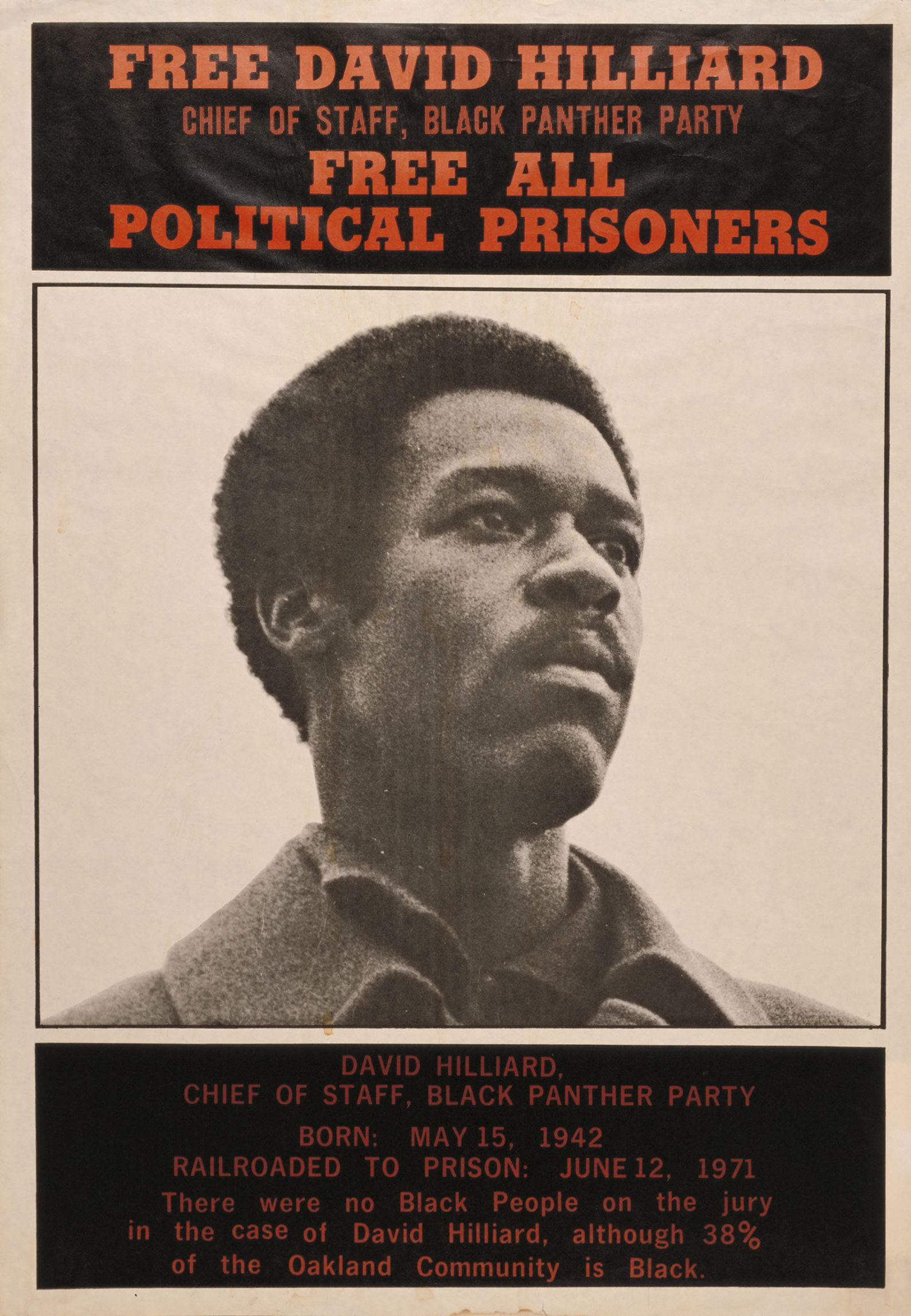
A poster advocating Hilliard's release following his 1971 conviction

In January 1968 Hilliard was arrested for handing out pamphlets outside of Oakland Technical High School.

Hilliard was convicted on two counts of assault with a deadly weapon for his part in a 1968 ambush on Oakland Police officers in retribution for the assassination of Martin Luther King. Two police officers were wounded. The April 6, 1968 encounter led to the death of party member Bobby Hutton and the capture of Eldridge Cleaver, who masterminded the botched operation. According to Cleaver, Hutton was shot by police while surrendering with his hands up. Hilliard left this standoff unscathed having taken shelter under a family friends bed.

The attention placed on the Black Panthers by the FBI heightened after the 1968 encounter. J. Edgar Hoover, the director of the FBI called the Black Panthers "the greatest threat to the internal security of the country."

On December 3, 1969, Hilliard was arrested for threatening to kill President Richard Nixon. This threat was announced in Hilliard's speech given on November 15, 1969, at Golden Gate Park. In his speech Hilliard was quoted saying "We will kill Richard Nixon." In July 1971, Hilliard was sentenced to one to ten years and incarcerated at Vacaville Prison. In January 1973, while serving a sentence of six months to 10 years, he was denied parole.

In his autobiography Revolutionary Suicide, Huey P. Newton claimed the district attorney of Alameda County was attempting to send Hilliard to prison on "trumped up charges".

== Later life ==
After being released from prison Hilliard moved to Los Angeles in 1978 and secured a job at Tom Hayden's organization called the Campaign for Economic Democracy (CED). During this post-prison period, Hilliard struggled with drug addiction. After moving to Connecticut, Hilliard worked as an organizer for the New England Health Care Employees Union. After going through drug treatment, Hilliard relapsed and continued to struggle with addiction. Hilliard lost contact with Huey Newton. Newton was murdered during a drug deal on August 22, 1989. Hilliard gave his eulogy.

== Dr. Huey P. Newton Foundation ==
With Huey Newton's second wife, Fredrika Newton, Hilliard later formed the Dr. Huey P. Newton Foundation. The mission of this organization is "to preserve and promulgate the history, ideals and legacy of the Black Panther Party and its founder Huey P. Newton through development and distribution of educational materials, establishment of educational conferences and forums, eventually starting a record label (Black Panther Records) clothing line (Black Panther Clothing)with his youngest son, maintenance and exhibition of historical archives."

== Bibliography ==
- Black Panthers Speak, Philip Foner, ed. New York: Da Capo, 1995 [1970]; ISBN 0-306-80627-4
- Shadow Of The Panther: Huey Newton And The Price Of Black Power In America, Hugh Pearson, Da Capo Press, April 21, 1995; ISBN 0201483416/ISBN 978-0201483413
- David Hilliard and Lewis Cole, This Side of Glory. Boston: Little, Brown, 1993; ISBN 0-316-36421-5
