= A Taste of Power =

1992 memoir by Elaine Brown

- First edition cover
- Author: Elaine Brown
- Language: English
- Genre: Memoir
- Publisher: Pantheon Books
- Publication date: 1992
- Publication place: United States
- Media type: Print
- ISBN: 978-1-101-97010-2

A Taste of Power: A Black Woman's Story (Pantheon Books, 1992) is a memoir written by American prison activist, writer, and former Black Panther Party chairwoman Elaine Brown. The book follows her life from childhood up through her activism with the Black Panther Party.

== Synopsis ==
In the early chapters of the book, Brown recalls growing up on York Street in a rough neighborhood of North Philadelphia. Due to her mother's persistence, she is able to attend an experimental elementary school in a nice neighborhood and becomes friends with some Jewish girls. From that point on, Brown describes being a part of two worlds. She would act "white" while hanging out with her school friends, and "black" when with the girls in her neighborhood.

At age 19, Brown moves to California, where she has a love affair with Jay Kennedy. She later ends the affair, and through her neighbor begins to meet people involved in the Black Panther Party. Brown describes her experiences in developing a black consciousness, and later, a feminist consciousness. She is subjected to a great deal of sexism in the Black Panthers and her own personal obstacles when becoming head of the party from 1974 to 1977.

During the black power movement, many men were angered by having to report to Elaine Brown because she was a woman. Her daughter, Ericka Abrams, recounts a memory of when Brown pulled a rifle on heavily armed members of the Black Panther Party. Some men believed that having a woman in charge undermined the objective of the movement. Men desired for the women to do more of the subordinate duties.

The book also covers her two runs for councilwoman in Oakland. There is a large amount of writing about friend, lover, and fellow Panther Huey P. Newton, including information on his theory of "revolutionary inter-communalism," in which he foresaw the weakening of the nation-state under the power of the market economy. Huey P. Newton is the one who appointed Elaine Brown as Black Panther Party Chairman when he fled to Cuba. She was chairman from 1974 to 1977, and left after her experiences with sexism within the Black Panthers. She also left because many of her comrades were put into prison or assassinated.

== Post publication ==
In Ortiz 1993, Elaine Brown's memoir was dissected. It was ridiculed by another former black panther leader, Kathleen Cleaver, who said Elaine's perception of the Black Panther Party was negative and unrepresentative of the Party's nature. Brown, however, spoke of her memoir as being the story of the black woman's perspective within the Black Panther Party. Brown was capturing her own experience within the Black Panther Party, not attempting to capture their full essence.

A Taste of Power was optioned in January, 2007 by HBO to use in its six-part series, The Black Panthers.
