= Murder of Betty Van Patter =

Bookkeeper for the Black Panther Party, murdered in 1974 in San Francisco Bay Area

Betty Van Patter
- Born: Betty Louise Floyd; October 12, 1929; U.S.
- Died: c. December 13, 1974 (aged 45); San Francisco, California, U.S.
- Cause of death: Beating
- Body discovered: January 17, 1975
- Occupation: Bookkeeper
- Known for: Victim of unsolved murder

Betty Louise Van Patter (née Floyd; October 12, 1929 – c. December 13, 1974) was a bookkeeper for the Black Panther Party, although she herself was white. Van Patter was murdered, a crime which remains unsolved.

== Biography ==
Van Patter worked as a bookkeeper for Ramparts magazine, and was introduced in 1974 to Panther leader Elaine Brown by the magazine's co-editor, David Horowitz, who had created the Educational Opportunities Commission for the Panthers. He suggested Van Patter as bookkeeper for the commission, and Brown hired her in June 1974. Van Patter went missing on December 13, 1974. On January 17 of the following year, her severely beaten corpse was found floating in San Francisco Bay.

Van Patter discovered major discrepancies in how the party managed its finances and warned that they were facing major tax problems. Elaine Brown wrote in her 1993 memoir, A Taste of Power, that she fired Van Patter after telling her to "cease her interrogations" and Van Patter refused. “Our accountants and tax lawyers could hold off the IRS,” Brown wrote. “It was for the party to keep our affairs in order. Betty Van Patter was showing herself useless in that endeavor, her nose in our business more than our books.”

There was insufficient evidence for police to charge anyone with Van Patter's death, but the Black Panther Party was "almost universally believed to be responsible," wrote journalist Frank Browning in 1987. Ken Kelley, a former associate of Huey P. Newton, claimed in 1989 that Newton told him that he had ordered Van Patter's murder, and that she had been tortured and raped before being killed. Christopher Hitchens wrote in the Los Angeles Times in 2003 that: "There is no doubt now, and there was precious little then, of the Panther leadership's complicity in this revolting crime."

== See also ==
- List of solved missing person cases (1970s)
- List of unsolved murders (1900–1979)
