= Raymond Hewitt =

Black Panther Party leader (1941–1988)

- Born: March 12, 1941; Los Angeles, California, U.S.
- Died: March 2, 1988 (aged 47); Los Angeles, California, U.S.
- Other name: Masai
- Occupations: Activist, Teacher
- Political party: Black Panther Party
- Movement: Black Power Movement
- Spouse: Ester Soriano
- Children: 4

Raymond "Masai" Hewitt (March 12, 1941 – March 2, 1988) was an American civil rights activist and one of the leaders of the Black Panther Party (BPP).

== Black Panther ==
Previous to joining the Black Panther Party, Hewitt worked as a school teacher and had been a Marxist activist, working with a group called United Front, a socialist organization which also taught self-defence to its members in the form of karate. Hewitt joined the Black Panther Party in 1967 and was given the title of Minister of Education. Hewitt was considered by the Panthers to have a strong understanding of political and Marxist theory.

=== Target of COINTELPRO ===
Hewitt was a target of COINTELPRO, a controversial FBI scheme intended to undermine radical organizations, which FBI Director J. Edgar Hoover had specifically directed to destroy the Black Panther Party. In 1970, the FBI created the false story, from a San Francisco-based informant, that he impregnated married actress Jean Seberg. Seberg was a supporter of the Black Panther Party, giving them a number of donations, and in the course of her interactions with the Panthers had befriended Hewitt. The story was reported by gossip columnist Joyce Haber of the Los Angeles Times, and was also printed by Newsweek magazine. Seberg went into premature labor and, on August 23, 1970, gave birth to a 4 lb (1.8 kg) baby girl. The child died two days later. She held a funeral in her hometown with an open casket that allowed reporters to see the infant's white skin, which disproved the rumors.

Seberg and her husband later sued Newsweek for libel and defamation, asking for US$200,000 in damages. She contended she became so upset after reading the story, that she went into premature labor, which resulted in the death of her daughter. A Paris court ordered Newsweek to pay the couple US$10,800 in damages and ordered Newsweek to print the judgment in their publication, plus eight other newspapers.

=== Departure from the BPP ===
By January 1973, Hewitt had become critical of the ever-increasing domination of the Panthers by Huey Newton. In a meeting of the Party's Central Committee, Hewitt suggested that the Central Committee by that point served only to confirm Newton's decisions:

In a central committee meeting, I did not attend, Masai brazenly stated, like the boy who announced the emperor was nude, that the Party operated on the basis of Huey's will. The Central Committee had become no more than a rubber stamp for it. The party had to address that weakness, to allow for a true consensus of will, at least the will of the central committee under the principles of democratic centralism. Huey had reduced the governing body of the party to little more than glorified members of the rank and file, Masai added. He concluded claiming that he was not in truth, therefore, a member of the central committee, as were none of the rest.

— Elaine Brown

In return, Newton stripped Hewitt of his role as Minister of Education; within weeks Hewitt had left the party.

Hewitt remained an activist for the rest of his life. He worked with the Southern Christian Leadership Conference's Southern Africa Resource Center, the International Human Rights Coalition of Los Angeles, and the Philippine Support Committee.

== Personal life ==
Hewitt fathered one daughter with fellow Black Panther leader Elaine Brown. Hewitt was married to activist Ester Soriano, with whom he had three sons.

== Death ==
On March 2, 1988, Hewitt suffered a heart attack while he watched the Grammy Awards on television with his wife. He was taken to Midway Hospital where he died a short time later.
