= Peacock Chair =

Peacock Chair may refer to:

- Peacock chair, a chair made of woven rattan or bamboo with a flared back, originated in the Philippines
- The Peacock Chair, a chair designed by Hans Wegner in 1947
- Peacock Chair, a chair designed by Victor Horta in the 1890s
- Peacock Chair, a chair designed by Frank Lloyd Wright in 1921
- Peacock Chair, a chair designed by Dror Benshetrit in 2009
