= Ann Arbor Argus =

Ann Arbor Argus was a radical, counterculture biweekly underground newspaper published in Ann Arbor, Michigan, starting January 24, 1969, and lasting until mid-1971. It was founded and edited by underground journalist Ken Kelley (1949–2008), a 19-year-old University of Michigan student who lived at the Trans-Love Energies commune off campus. The paper was started by Kelley and a friend out of his apartment, but soon moved into well-furnished office space provided by the Episcopal Church half a block from the university campus, in the basement of Canterbury House, a church-run coffee-house, and later relocated into a two-story house at 708 Arch Street. The Argus was closely connected to John Sinclair's radical White Panther Party and the Students for a Democratic Society. It was a member of the Underground Press Service and the Liberation News Service. It had no connection to the earlier 19th century Ann Arbor newspaper of the same name. Circulation in 1969 was reported at 14,000 copies.

== See also ==
- Underground newspapers
- Underground press
- List of underground newspapers of the 1960s counterculture
