= Ken Kelley (journalist) =

American journalist (1949–2008)

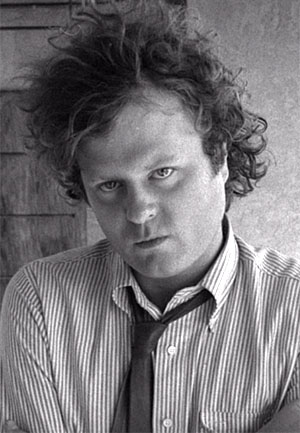
- Photograph of Kelley by filmmaker George Csicsery
- Born: Kenneth M. Kelley; September 24, 1949; Ann Arbor, MI
- Died: January 13, 2008 (aged 58); Pleasanton, CA
- Education: University of Michigan, Ann Arbor (attended)
- Occupations: journalist, editor, publisher
- Writing career
- Language: English
- Years active: 1969–1990s
- Notable works: Ann Arbor Argus, 1969-71; SunDance magazine, 1971; Anita Bryant interview for Playboy, 1978
- Movement: underground press

Ken Kelley (September 24, 1949 – January 13, 2008) was an American journalist and publisher, active in the underground press movement. He founded and edited the underground magazines the Ann Arbor Argus and SunDance, and was a notable interviewer for Playboy magazine.

== Early life ==
Ken Kelley was born on September 24, 1949, in Ann Arbor and grew up in Monroe, MI.

He attended the University of Michigan, Ann Arbor on a full scholarship, studying chemistry but dropping out after three semesters. While at University of Michigan, he worked on the student newspaper, the Michigan Daily, lived at the Trans-Love Energies commune off campus, and was involved in the White Panther Party.

== Career ==
In 1969, Kelley founded the Ann Arbor Argus, which ran until 1971 and reached a circulation of 14,000.

In the early 1970s, Kelley moved to the San Francisco Bay Area and, along with Craig Pyes, founded SunDance, an underground magazine funded by John Lennon and Yoko Ono.

Kelley joined the staff of the Berkeley Barb in February 1973 and became managing editor that summer. Alongside fellow Berkeley Barb columnists Dancing Bear and Gabrielle Schang, Kelley was a correspondent on Earthquake News, a 1973 alternative television news pilot in San Francisco.

Starting in 1976, Kelley became a regular writer for Playboy, best known for his interviews of notable figures. His most well-known interview was of Anita Bryant in the May 1978 issue, in which she revealed her homophobic and anti-Semitic views. Kelley had traveled with Bryant and her husband for a week and protected her from a pieing incident while conducting the interview. The Kelley–Bryant interview is portrayed in the comedic play, Anita Bryant's Playboy Interview, which premiered in 2016 in Silver Lake, Los Angeles. Kelley also interviewed Ferdinand and Imelda Marcos, Cheech & Chong, Abbie Hoffman, Arthur C. Clarke, and Ray Bradbury, among others, for Playboy.

Kelley won a Maggie Award for his 1987 interview of Lyndon LaRouche for Focus Magazine.

== Personal life ==
In 1971, Kelley was issued a subpoena from a federal grand jury probing the 1971 United States Capitol bombing, and subsequently burned the subpoena during a press conference with Yippie leader Abbie Hoffman.

Kelley became interested in the Divine Light Mission in 1973 and wrote about it extensively. He started writing a book about the Divine Light Mission entitled Brave New Bliss, but left it unfinished at the time of his death.

Kelley was a press aide to Huey P. Newton. After Newton's death, Kelley wrote that Newton had said to him that he ordered the murder of Betty Van Patter.

== Later life and death ==
In 2005, Kelley was arrested on charges of possession of child pornography. While awaiting the outcome of an appeal, he had a heart attack in jail and died on January 13, 2008. The following April, federal prosecutors asked to drop charges against Kelley.
