= Revolutionary Suicide =

1973 autobiography by Huey P. Newton

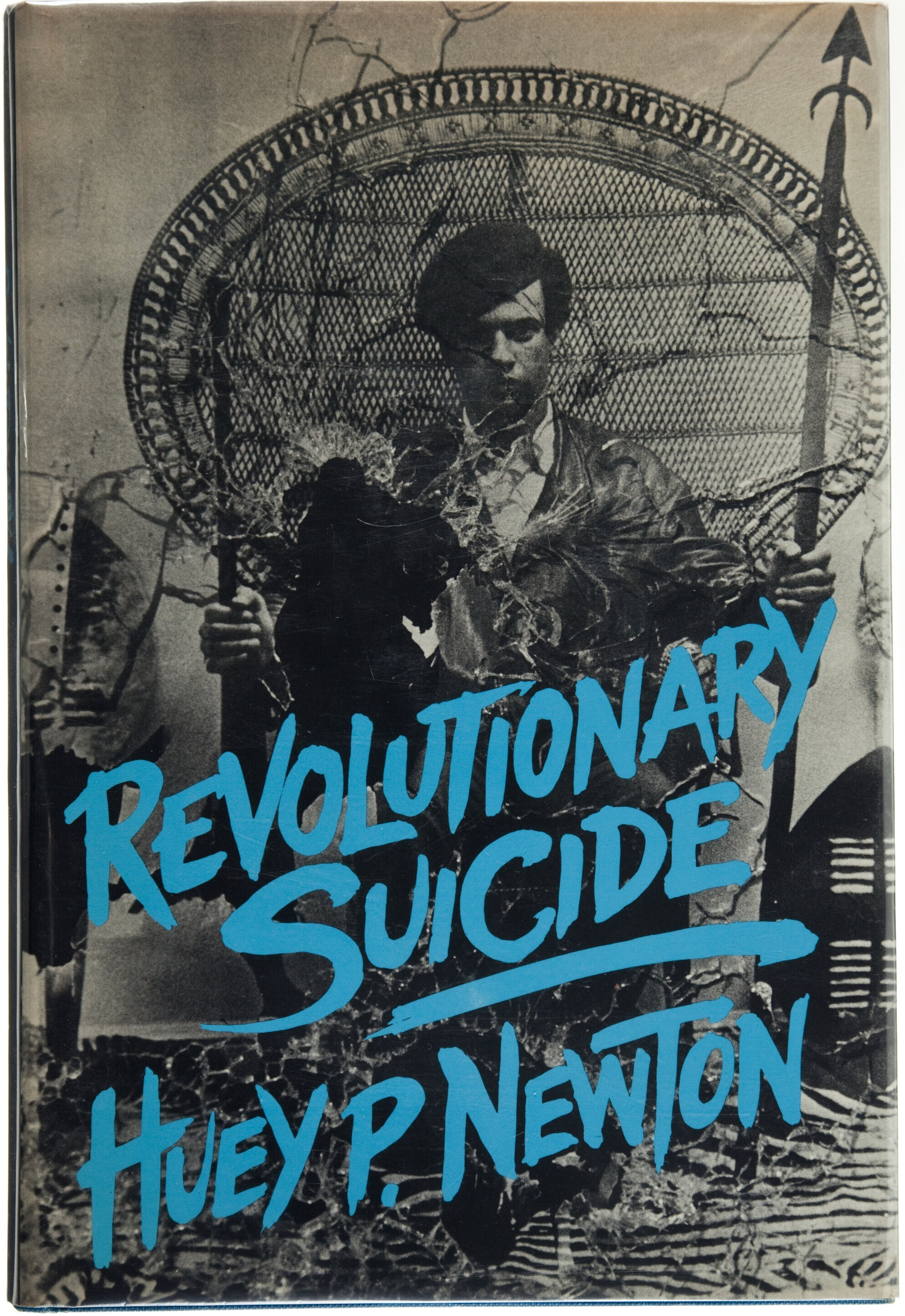
- Book cover
- Author: Huey P. Newton
- Language: English
- Subject: Black Panther Party
- Genre: Autobiography
- Publisher: Random House
- Publication date: 1973
- Publication place: United States
- ISBN: 0-86316-326-2

Revolutionary Suicide is an autobiography written by Huey P. Newton originally published in 1973. Newton was a major figure in the American Black power movement and in the wider 1960s counterculture. He was a co-founder and leader of what was then known as the Black Panther Party (BPP) for Self-Defence with Bobby Seale. The chief ideologue and strategist of the BPP, Newton taught himself how to read during his last year of high school, which led to his enrollment in Merrit College in Oakland in 1966; the same year he formed the BPP. The Party urged members to challenge the status quo with armed patrols of the impoverished streets of Oakland, and to form coalitions with other oppressed groups. The party spread across America and internationally as well, forming coalitions with the Vietnamese, Chinese, and Cubans.

== Background ==
Huey P. Newton co-founded, with Bobby Seale, and was one of the leaders of, the Black Panther Party (BPP). The party was founded in Oakland California in October 1966 at a time of rising racial tension in the US. There had been serious race riots in the Harlem area of New York in 1964 and Watts area of Los Angeles in 1965. Radical black leader Malcolm X was assassinated in 1965 at a rally in Harlem.

Newton was heavily influenced by Malcolm X and by other revolutionary movements of the period. The BPP were seen as leaders of the Black Power movement as the Civil Rights movement waned and more radical groups came to the fore, however this view is disputed by some historians. The party issued a ten point program, reiterated in Revolutionary Suicide, which focused on the black community having the freedom to determine their own destiny and advocated for black people to carry weapons and confront police. This led to conflict with the police and Newton was jailed in September 1968 for the manslaughter of a police officer, John Frey. In the book Newton describes a confrontation with police but other than being shot himself he says he has no memory of the events.

While he was in prison, he was visited regularly by J. Herman Blake, Assistant Professor of Sociology at the University of California Santa Cruz. During one visit the idea of writing a book was discussed. The initial idea was that Blake would write a biography of Newton. They began the process while Newton was still in prison. Blake would transcribe their conversations onto a tape recorder immediately after the visits. Following a campaign by supporters, Newton was released in August 1970. Following his release Newton and Blake decided that the book would be an autobiography. The book covered his life from his early days in Oakland up to his trip to China in 1971.

== Synopsis ==
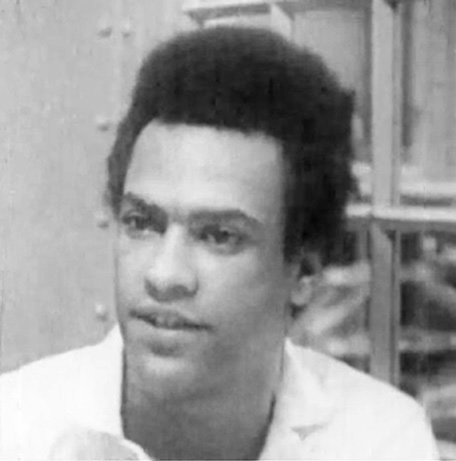
Huey P. Newton

Revolutionary Suicide was written when Newton was only 31 and he dedicated the book to his parents. As well as being the story of his life up to that point it also includes his manifesto and political philosophy. In the opening manifesto section Newton outlines his idea of ‘revolutionary suicide’ as opposed to what he describes as ‘reactionary suicide’. Reactionary suicide is a suicide brought about by despair with one's social conditions. On the other hand, Newton says a ‘revolutionary suicide’ is a death brought about by forcibly challenging the system and repressive agencies that can lead a person to commit reactionary suicide. In other words, the revolutionary knows he or she will risk death but chooses to fight to improve the conditions for their community rather than submit to the existing state that has created these conditions.

The book goes on to describe his time growing up tough on the streets of Oakland, how he taught himself to read by studying Plato's Republic, his political awakening and the formation of the BPP with Bobby Seale. The next chapters detail the shooting of officer Frey, his trial conviction and later release. The later chapters cover the period after his release and his attempts to rebuild the Party. The last chapters cover his visit to China and what he describes as the ‘defection’ of Eldridge Cleaver.

== Commercial and critical reception ==
On its initial publication in 1973 the book was featured on the front page of the book sections of both the New York Times and the Washington Post. This prominence is an indication of the importance of the book at the time although it garnered mixed reviews. In the New York Times Review of Books, Murray Kempton wrote a long feature article on the Revolutionary Suicide under the by-line ‘At one and the same time the goodest and the baddest’. The essay focuses more on Newton himself than his book. Kempton, a broadcaster and critic, is both complimentary and highly critical of Newton. The Washington Post review by American author Lee Lockwood in its Bookworld section is positive. In another New York Times review Christopher Lehmann-Haupt writes that, while the book was eagerly anticipated, it is ”boring” and argues that Newton's main aim in the work is to the change the image of the Panthers.

Ernest M. Collins from the Department of Government at Ohio University wrote a review, which praised Newton's writing when it was “confined to institutions with which he is familiar” but described his views on the wider political world as ‘shallow’.

A review in the Times in London by John Arderne Rex called it “perhaps the best written book by a black leader to come out of the United States”. Rex was a Professor of Sociology at University of Warwick and an author. He praises the book for being a mature political philosophy and for Newton's interest in social justice.

== Analysis ==
Newton's writing and ideas met with a mixed reception. Political scientist John McCartney claimed he was the black power movement's foremost political thinker. In his book ‘Huey P. Newton, the Radical Theorist’ the scholar of African American politics Professor Judson L. Jefferies discussed how Newton's interest in philosophy and his wide reading influenced his thinking. Jefferies said his writing did not compare favourably to Malcolm X or Martin Luther King but praised him as one of the most important black thinkers of the time. Brian Sowers pointed out the influence of Plato's ‘Republic” on Revolutionary Suicide, particularly the second half of the book, and compares Newton to a modern-day Socrates.

The academic Davi Johnson, Assistant Professor of Communication Studies at Southwestern University claimed that Newton's rhetoric sat in a tradition mould of conservative rhetoric, and he and the Black Panther Party were not quite the outsider dangerous force portrayed in the media at the time. Johnson pointed out how Newton used the rhetorical device of jeremiad, a list of complaints about the prevailing society, in a very traditional and conservative way and in that sense his rhetoric was not so revolutionary.

Another academic, Joanna Freer, writing in the journal American Studies, claims that author Thomas Pynchon critiqued Newton's concept of revolutionary suicide in his popular novel "Gravity's Rainbow”. Freer says that Pynchon, through his character Wimpe, is critical of Newton's belief in Marxist dialectical materialism and in the idea that revolution was inevitable.

Judson L Jefferies summarised the reviews of Revolutionary Suicide as “harsh”. He summarises a number of reviews but points out that in many cases the reviews are focused on Newton and the BPP rather than the book in question. He argues that the authors of these reviews seem to be intent on undermining Newton based on their own idea of who he is rather than giving the book a fair review.

The term "revolutionary suicide" was appropriated by Jim Jones, leader of the new religious and socialist movement Peoples Temple. Jones ignored Newton's definition of the phrase, instead using the term to describe actual suicide as a form of revolutionary protest. The term was used by Jones to describe the mass murder/suicide that took place at Jonestown, Guyana on 18 November 1978. Jones' use of the phrase "revolutionary suicide," as recorded on an audio tape of the mass death, has been widely quoted and used in media coverage of the event.

From 2013 the Black Lives Matter movement rose to prominence in the US in response to the continuing police brutality against African Americans. Many writers and scholars noted the similarities in the grassroots nature of both the BLM and the BPP and in many of the programs they advocated. Both organisations were formed in Oakland. However, writers also pointed to differences in approach and methods. A key point was that in 2016, 50 years after Newton formed the BPP and forty-three years after the publication of Revolutionary Suicide African American communities were still facing similar issues to those outlined in the book by Newton.

The English musician and singer Julian Cope released an album in 2013 called Revolutionary Suicide. He acknowledged that he took the name from Newton's work and explained how he interpreted the term as being about “ultimate freedom” adding "surely we can also be our own hangman if it gets too much?”.

== Contents ==
Revolutionary Suicide begins with a manifesto in which Newton discusses his ideas of revolutionary and reactionary suicide. The book is divided into thirty-three chapters and six parts. Part one is about Newton's early life growing up in a poor but loving family in Oakland. He talks about the failure of the public-school system to educate him. Part Two covers his troubled teenage years and time at Merritt College. In this section, he describes how he taught himself to read by borrowing his older brother Melvin's copy of Plato's “Republic”. In the third part he describes his political awakening and the founding of the BPP with Bobby Seale. This part also includes a summary of the BPP's Ten-point program and a chapter on how Eldridge Cleaver joined the BPP. Part Four revolves around the shooting of officer Frey, and Newton's wounding and subsequent hospitalisation. In part Five he describes the trial and his time in prison. The final part details his release and subsequent attempts to maintain and restructure the BPP and his retrial. In the final chapters he talks about his controversial trip to China in September 1971. He contrasts the behaviour and role of police in China with the police force in the US. On his trip he met the Chinese premier Zhou Enlai though not the head of state, Communist Party Leader Chairman Mao Zedong. Newton was impressed with China. He then has a final short chapter that deals with Cleaver's decision to leave the party and move to Algeria.

This is followed with an epilogue entitled ‘I Am We” which Newton says is based on an old African saying (cf. Ubuntu philosophy). In this he reiterates the difference between revolutionary and reactionary suicide and quotes both Mao's Little Red Book and the Gospel of St. Paul to illustrate his point.

The book's original cover photograph shows Newton sitting on a type of throne holding a rifle and a spear. The image was seen as controversial as it played into the violent imagery which had surrounded the BPP. Early photographs of party members in black shirts and berets carrying weapons shocked many. The photograph is regarded as an iconic image of the counterculture in US. The image had been produced as a publicity poster for the BPP. The original photographer is unknown. The photograph was described by Bobby Seale as a “centralized symbol of the leadership of black people in the community”.

The original hardcover edition contained several pages of photographs. These include family photographs, photographs of other panther party leaders and one of Newton with Chinese Premier Zhou Enlai taken on his visit to China in September 1971.

== Publication history ==
The first edition was published in hardcover in 1973 by Harcourt Brace Jovanovich Inc. New York. This edition did not have an introduction.

In England the publisher was Wildwood House. The book was published in both hardback and paperback editions. ISBN 9780704500587. This edition was published with a different cover. It featured a side profile shot of Huey Newton replacing the more controversial enthroned photograph.

In 1995 Writers and Readers published a softcover edition with the original cover photograph. ISBN 9780863163265

In September 2009 Penguin books published a paperback edition as part of its Penguin Classics Deluxe Edition series. ISBN 9780143105329. The paperback had a deckle edge, a cover illustration by Ho Che Anderson and an introduction by Newton's widow Fredrika Newton. An e-book version was released at the same time.

In 2018, a French edition was released with a preface by Ahmad Sa'adat. ISBN 9782955917428.

== See also ==
- Ten-Point Program
- The Diary of Malcolm X

== Sources ==
- Entry at Penguin Group, the publishers
- Entry at GoodReads
