= Elaine Brown =

American activist and singer (born 1943)

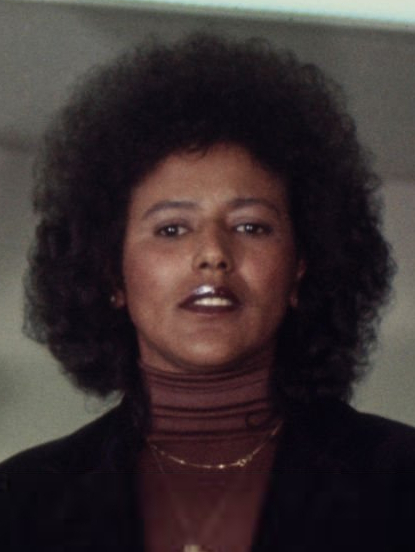
- Brown in 1977
- Born: March 2, 1943 (age 83); Philadelphia, Pennsylvania, U.S.
- Occupations: Activist; writer; singer
- Political party: Black Panther; Green
- Movement: Black Power movement
- Children: 1
- Website: sisterelainebrown.com

Elaine Brown (born March 2, 1943) is an American prison activist, writer, singer, and former Black Panther Party chairwoman who is based in Oakland, California. Brown briefly ran for the Green Party presidential nomination in 2008.

She is the COO of Oakland & the World Enterprises, which she founded in 2014.

== Early life ==
Elaine Brown grew up in the inner city of North Philadelphia with her mother Dorothy Clark and an absent father. Despite being in desperate poverty, Brown's mother worked hard to provide for Elaine. She was enrolled in private schooling, took music lessons, and had nice clothing. During her childhood, she studied classical piano and ballet for many years at a predominantly white experimental elementary school. As a young Black woman, Elaine had very few African-American friends and spent most of her time with white people. After graduating from Philadelphia High School for Girls, a public preparatory school for gifted young women, she studied at Temple University for less than a semester. She withdrew from Temple because of her desire to work in the music industry. Brown moved to Los Angeles, California, to become a professional songwriter. While in Los Angeles, Brown enrolled in the University of California Los Angeles. She later went on to briefly attend Mills College and Southwestern University School of Law.

Upon arriving in California with little money and few contacts, Brown got work as a cocktail waitress at the strip club The Pink Pussycat. While working at the Pink Pussycat, she met Jay Richard Kennedy, a music executive who taught her about the intricacies of social justice. They became lovers. Brown learnt about political radicalization first hand while in a relationship with Kennedy. Because of the thorough education on the civil rights movement, capitalism, and communism which Kennedy provided to her, Brown later became involved with the Black Liberation Movement. After living together for a brief time in the Hollywood Hills Hotel, the pair parted ways. After this pivotal relationship, Brown's involvement in politics grew and she began working for the radical newspaper Harambee. Soon after, Brown became the first representative of the Black Student Alliance at the Black Congress in California. In April 1968, after the assassination of Martin Luther King Jr., she attended her first meeting of the Los Angeles chapter of the Black Panther Party.

== Involvement with the Black Panther Party ==
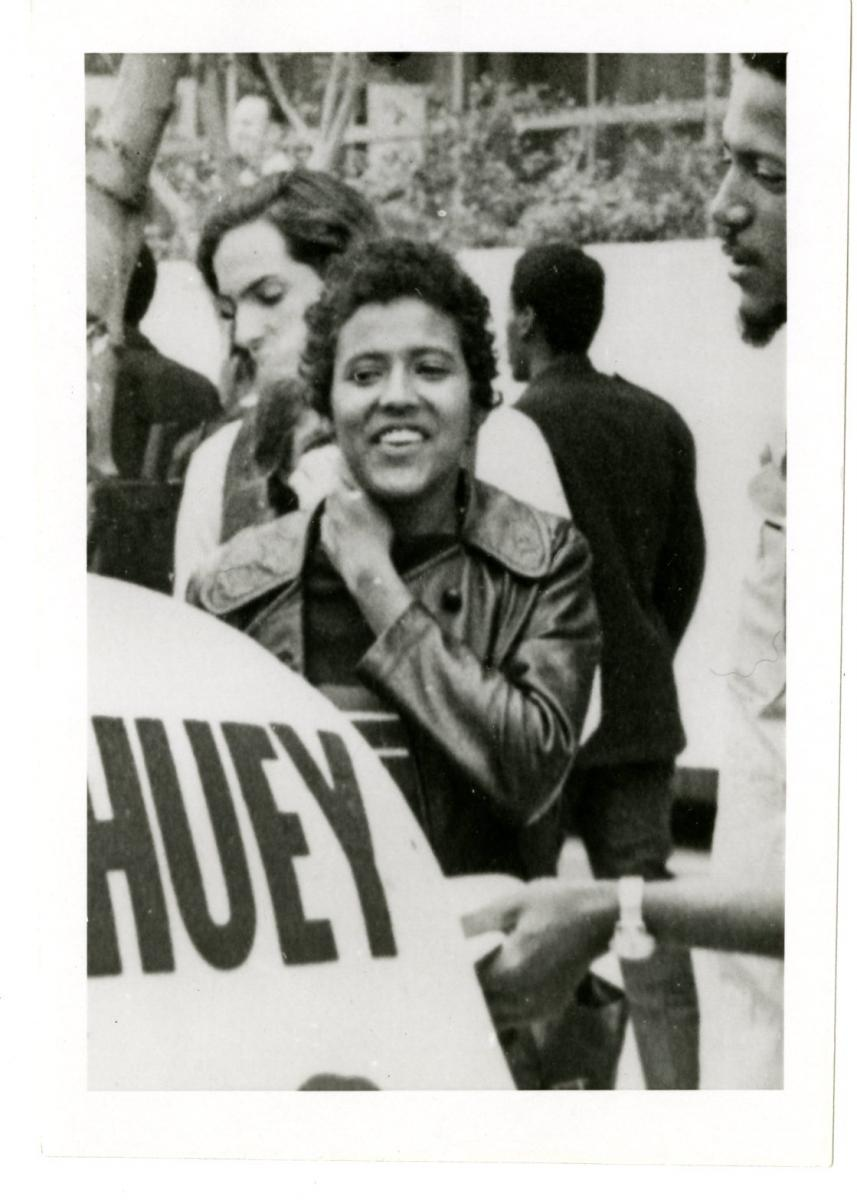
Brown at a Free Huey rally c. 1967–1970

In 1968, Brown joined the Black Panther Party as a rank-and-file member, studying revolutionary literature, and selling Black Panther Party newspapers. She soon helped the party set up its first Free Breakfast for Children program in Los Angeles, as well as the Party's initial Free Busing to Prisons Program and Free Legal Aid Program.

In 1968, Brown was commissioned by David Hilliard, the Party chief of staff, to record her songs, a request resulting in the album Seize the Time. She eventually assumed the role of editor of the Black Panther publication in the Southern California Branch of the Party.

Brown was part of a U.S. People's Anti-Imperialist Delegation which visited China in 1970, along with fellow prominent party member Eldridge Cleaver.

In 1971, Brown became a member of the Party's Central Committee as Minister of Information, replacing the expelled Cleaver. In 1973, Brown was commissioned to record more songs by Black Panther Party founder and Minister of Defense Huey P. Newton. These songs resulted in the album Until We're Free.

As part of a directive by Newton, Brown unsuccessfully ran for the Oakland city council in 1973, getting 30 percent of the vote. She ran again in 1975, losing again with 44 percent of the vote. When Newton fled to Cuba in 1974 to avoid criminal charges, he appointed Brown to lead the Black Panther Party. Brown was the only woman to do so. She chaired the Black Panther Party from 1974 until 1977. She dealt with regular sexism because the men were angered by the thought of taking orders from a woman.

A woman in the Black Power movement was considered, at best, irrelevant. A woman asserting herself was a pariah. If a black woman assumed a role of leadership, she was said to be eroding black manhood, to be hindering the progress of the black race. She was an enemy of the black people.... I knew I would have to muster something mighty to manage the Black Panther Party.

— From her 1992 memoir A Taste of Power

During Brown's leadership of the Black Panther Party, she focused on electoral politics and community service. In 1977, she managed Lionel Wilson’s victorious campaign to become Oakland's first black mayor. Also, Brown founded the Panther's Liberation School, which was recognized by the state of California as a model school.

Brown stepped down from chairing the Black Panther Party less than a year after Newton's return from Cuba in 1977, when Newton refused to condemn the beating of Regina Davis, an administrator of the Panther Liberation School. Other male members of the party beat Davis and broke her jaw because she reprimanded a coworker when he did not do an assignment. Newton opted for solidarity with the men. This incident was the point at which Brown could no longer tolerate the sexism and patriarchy of the Black Panther Party. For many, Brown's leaving was seen as a turning point for the Party. She left Oakland with her daughter, Ericka, and moved to Los Angeles – fearing for her personal safety.

Brown recorded two albums: Seize the Time (Vault, 1969) and Until We're Free (Motown Records, 1973). Seize the Time includes "The Meeting", the anthem of the Black Panther Party.

== Later activism ==
After leaving the Black Panther Party, also in order to raise her daughter Ericka, Brown worked on her memoir, A Taste of Power. She eventually returned to the struggle for black liberation, especially espousing the need for radical prison reform. From 1980 to 1983, she attended Southwestern University School of Law in Los Angeles. From 1989 to 1996, she lived in France. In 1996, Brown moved to Atlanta, Georgia, and founded Fields of Flowers, Inc., a non-profit organization committed to providing educational opportunities for impoverished African-American children. In 1998, she co-founded the grassroots group Mothers Advocating Juvenile Justice to advocate for children being prosecuted as adults in the state of Georgia. Around the same time, she continued her advocacy for incarcerated youth by founding and leading the Michael Lewis Legal Defense Committee. Michael Lewis, also known as "Little B", was sentenced to life in prison at the age of 14 for a murder that Brown believes he did not commit. Brown would eventually write a non-fiction novel, The Condemnation of Little B, which analyzes the prosecution of Lewis as part of the greater problem of the increased imprisonment of black youth.

In 2003, Brown co-founded the National Alliance for Radical Prison Reform, which helps thousands of prisoners find housing after they are released on parole, facilitates transportation for family visits to prisons, helps prisoners find employment, and raises money for prisoner phone calls and gifts. In 2005, while protesting a G-8 Summit in Sea Island, Georgia, Brown learned of the massive poverty in the nearby city of Brunswick, Georgia. Brown then attempted to run for mayor of Brunswick against Bryan Thompson. Running on the Green Party ticket, Brown hoped to become mayor in order to use her influence to bring the Michael Lewis case to prominence, as well as to empower blacks in Brunswick by using her elected office to create a base of economic power for the city's majority black and poor population through redistribution of the city's revenues. Though Brown was eventually disqualified from running and voting in Brunswick because she failed to establish residency in the city, her efforts brought widespread attention to Michael Lewis's case. She later became a co-founder of the Brunswick Women's Association for a People's Blueprint.

Brown has continued her prison reform advocacy by lecturing frequently at colleges and universities in the US. Since 1995, she has lectured at more than forty colleges and universities, as well as numerous conferences.

== 2007 Green Party role ==
In March 2007, Brown announced her bid to become the Green Party presidential nominee for the upcoming 2008 election. Brown felt that a campaign was necessary to promote the interests of those not represented by the major political parties, especially the interests of women under 30 and African Americans. Her platform focused on the needs of working-class families, promoting living wages for all, free health care, more funding for public education, more affordable housing, removal of troops from Iraq, improving the environment, and promoting equality. Brown intended on using her campaign to bring many minorities to the Green Party in the hope that it would better represent a revolutionary force for social justice. In late 2007, she resigned from the Green Party, as she found that the Party remained dominated by whites who had no intention of using the ballot to actualize real social progress, and will aggressively repel attempts to do so".

In 2010, inmates in more than seven Georgia prisons used contraband cellphones to organize a nonviolent strike for better prison conditions, Brown became their "closest adviser outside prison walls". She "helped distill the inmate complaints into a list of demands. She held a conference call... to develop a strategy with various groups, including the Georgia chapter of the National Association for the Advancement of Colored People and the Nation of Islam."

== Lawsuit against the City of Oakland ==
In 2017, Brown was awarded $3.75 million for damages she received when sitting Oakland Councilwoman Desley Brooks attacked her in an Oakland restaurant. The two had been arguing over a public housing application.

== Personal life ==
Brown has one daughter, Ericka Abram, fathered by Black Panther member Raymond Hewitt, but Hewitt was mostly absent from his daughter's life. At Hewitt's funeral, Elaine Brown was in attendance.

== Bibliography ==
- Brown, Elaine. The Condemnation of Little B: New Age Racism in America (Boston: Beacon, 2002).
- Brown, Elaine. A Taste of Power: A Black Woman's Story (New York: Doubleday, 1992).

== Discography ==
=== Studio albums ===
- Seize The Time - Black Panther Party (1969)
- Elaine Brown (1973)

=== EPs ===
- No Time / Until We're Free (1973)
