= People v. Newton =

1970 criminal case in California, US

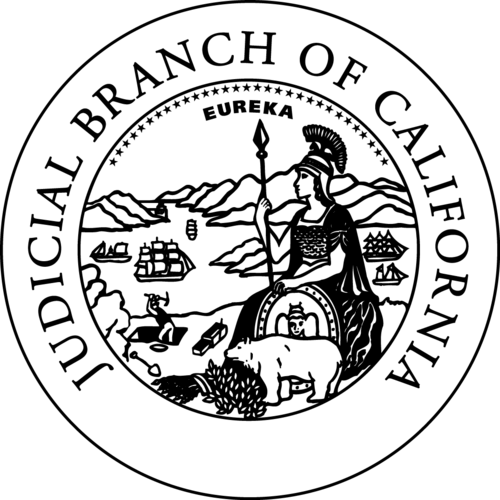
- Court: California Court of Appeal, First District, Division 4
- Full case name: The People v. Huey P. Newton
- Decided: May 29, 1970
- Citations: 8 Cal. App. 3d 359; 87 Cal.Rptr. 394

Court membership
- Judges sitting: Joseph A. Rattigan, Preston Devine, Winslow Christian

People v. Newton, 8 Cal. App. 3d 359 (Ct. App. 1970), was a controversial appeal arising from the voluntary manslaughter conviction of Huey P. Newton, the co-founder of the Black Panther Party for Self Defense. The California Court of Appeal reversed Newton's conviction due to prejudicial error stemming from the trial court's failure to instruct the jury as to the possibility of involuntary unconsciousness as a complete defense to the charges. Though Newton's attorney arguably withdrew the defense at trial, the Court nonetheless held that the failure to instruct violated Newton's constitutional right to have the jury determine all material issues based on the evidence. This case stands for the proposition that trial courts have an affirmative duty to instruct juries as to a defense of involuntary unconsciousness where there exists evidence that may support that conclusion.

== Background of the case ==
In the early morning hours of October 28, 1967, Officer John Frey of the Oakland Police Department identified and stopped a Black Panther vehicle driven by Huey P. Newton along with an unidentified passenger. Officer Frey conducted the stop on the basis of outstanding warrants issued to a Laverne Williams for parking violations associated with the vehicle. Meanwhile, Officer Frey requested an additional patrol while investigating the apparent discrepancy between the driver's identity and the registration for the vehicle.

Officer Herbert Heanes, upon responding to the request for backup, asked Newton to step outside of the vehicle while Officer Frey informed Newton of his arrest. Officer Heanes testified that he heard a gunshot, which struck his arm, as Officer Frey accompanied Newton to the patrol car. During an ensuing physical altercation between Officer Frey and Newton, Officer Heanes shot Newton in the midsection. Officer Heanes further testified that he heard additional shots fired, though there was some discrepancy as to the order of the gunshots in the altercation. A nearby bus driver, however, witnessed the shooting. The bus driver testified that Newton produced a concealed firearm that "went off," striking Officer Heanes and that Newton also used this firearm to fire several more shots into Officer Frey, who ultimately was pronounced dead on arrival at Merritt Hospital. Newton was later arrested that morning in the emergency room at Kaiser Hospital in Oakland.

At his murder trial, Newton testified in his own defense that Officer Frey hurled racial epithets at him and struck him in the face. Newton further testified that after Officer Frey allegedly brandished his firearm, he experienced a "sensation like . . . boiling hot soup had been spilled on my stomach." Newton testified that after hearing a "volley of shots," he remembered nothing else until he arrived at Kaiser Hospital. Newton "expressly testified that he was 'unconscious or semiconscious' during this interval." In order to corroborate that testimony, the defense called Dr. Bernard Diamond, who stated that Newton's recollection is consistent with a gunshot wound to the abdominal cavity, which is likely to produce a "profound reflex shock reaction" that can lead to a loss of consciousness.

== Procedural posture and disposition ==
The Superior Court of Alameda County convicted defendant Huey P. Newton of voluntary manslaughter in the fatal shooting of a California police officer. On appeal, the Court of Appeal of California (First District, Fourth Division) reversed the defendant's conviction and ordered a new trial. The Government's petition for hearing by the California Supreme Court was denied on July 29, 1970. Following two subsequent mistrials, the District Attorney declined to pursue a fourth trial, thus dismissing the charges against Newton.

== Majority opinion ==
With Judge Devine and Judge Christian concurring, Judge Rattigan authored the Majority Opinion in reversing Newton's voluntary manslaughter conviction. The California Court of Appeal found prejudicial error in the trial court's failure to instruct the jury about Newton's potential unconsciousness as a defense to criminal homicide.

While the Majority ultimately held that the trial court erroneously failed to instruct the jury on Newton's potential defense of unconsciousness, the trial record actually showed that the defense's request for the instruction was "withdrawn" upon deliberation in chambers. According to the trial transcript, Newton and his defense attorney both agreed to the trial court's decision to instruct the jury on diminished capacity instead of unconsciousness.

Despite the defense's purported "withdrawal," the Court of Appeal found that the trial judge erred in failing to instruct the jury about unconsciousness as a complete defense. First, the Court found that "a trial court is under a duty to instruct upon diminished capacity, in the absence of a request and upon its own motion, where the evidence so indicates." The Court reasoned that a state of diminished capacity and unconsciousness are matters of degree. The former provides a partial defense to first- or second-degree murder, while the latter is a complete defense to any criminal homicide, including voluntary manslaughter.

Expounding on that reasoning, the Court of Appeal clarified that a state of unconsciousness, under the law, "need not reach the physical dimensions commonly associated with the term (coma, inertia, incapability of locomotion or manual action, and so on); it can exist . . . where the subject physically acts in fact but is not, at the time, conscious of acting." Thus, Newton's testimony coupled with expert testimony regarding "reflex shock reaction" to abdominal gunshot wounds constituted sufficient evidence for at least the possibility of a finding of legal unconsciousness.

Furthermore, the Court held that the trial court's instruction on diminished capacity did not neutralize the error in failing to instruct the jury on unconsciousness. Instead, the Court concluded that "evidence of both states is not antithetical; jury instructions on the effect of both will be required where the evidence supports a finding of either." Thus, the trial court erred in failing to instruct the jury to consider the possibility that Newton was unconscious at the time of the shooting, thereby lacking the requisite mental state—mens rea—to commit any crime at all.

Finally, the Court found the possibility of additional prejudicial error given the trial court's apparent invitation to the defense to choose between a jury instruction on diminished capacity or unconsciousness. However, there was no direct proof a compelled choice since the deliberation over jury instructions occurred in closed chambers. Thus, the Court of Appeal addressed the question of whether Newton voluntarily and intelligently waived his right to the instruction on unconsciousness, thereby foreclosing the complaint of error on appeal. Relying on the California Supreme Court's earlier precedent, the Court of Appeal answered in the negative. Rather, a waiver of the instruction forecloses an appeal on that basis only where defense counsel "expresses a deliberate tactical purpose in suggesting, resisting, or acceding to an instruction" so as to "nullify the trial court's obligation to instruct in the cause." Conversely, defense counsel's neglect or mistake does not bar an appeal where the trial court retained an affirmative duty to instruct the jury on its own motion.

Given the facts, only a theory of unconsciousness would afford Newton a complete defense to criminal homicide consistent with his denial of the shootings altogether. Accordingly, the Court of Appeal failed to discern any "deliberate tactical purpose" in defense counsel's withdrawal of its initial request for the relevant jury instructions. Therefore, the Court of Appeal held that Newton could raise the prejudicial error claim on appeal.

== Controversy ==
The murder trial of Huey Newton, co-founder and Minister of Defense of the Black Panther Party, was mired in controversy given the extensive pretrial media coverage that purportedly linked Newton to the fatal shooting of Officer Frey. In Irvin v. Dowd, the United States Supreme Court concluded that "[i]t is not required . . . that the jurors be totally ignorant of the facts and issues involved . . . [i]t is sufficient is the juror can lay aside his impression or opinion and render a verdict on the evidence presented in court." Accordingly, Newton's defense counsel played a significant role in the voir dire process in hopes of selecting an impartial jury that was capable of putting aside prejudicial pretrial impressions about the defendant.

Nonetheless, Newton appealed his eventual conviction for voluntary manslaughter on the basis of unconstitutional grand and petit jury selection procedures, in addition to the failure to instruct the jury on a defense of unconsciousness. While the latter provided sufficient grounds to reverse Newton's conviction, the Court of Appeal still addressed—and denied—the charges of improper jury selection in the murder trial.

Regarding grand jury selection, Newton argued that the pertinent statutes in Alameda County "resulted in unconstitutional discrimination against young persons, low income groups and black persons." However, the Court of Appeal reiterated that constitutional standards for selecting grand and petit jurors must not "systematically exclude, or substantially underrepresent, the members of any identifiable group in the community." On that basis, the Court of Appeal found that Newton failed to prove purposeful discrimination during grand jury selection.

Newton also challenged the constitutionality of the petit jury since it was drawn exclusively from Alameda County voter registration lists, which he argued "results in underrepresentation of poor persons and black persons on juries, because such people are less likely to be registered voters." Here, the Court of Appeal stated that "the county's discretion to use voter registration lists as the source of jurors is subject to the constitutional requirement that juries must reasonably reflect a cross-section of the community." Newton did demonstrate a statistical disparity between black persons serving on juries pooled from voter registration lists and the relative percentage of the eligible black population in Alameda County. However, the Court of Appeal held that the statistical difference was not substantial enough to sustain a claim of underrepresentation of black persons on the trial jury.

Finally, the Court of Appeal also rejected Newton's claim that the controversial nature of the trial, which pitted a black defendant against white police officers, required that at least one resident of a "black ghetto" serve as a petit juror. Again, the Court of Appeal noted that the Fourteenth Amendment "requires only that the jury be indiscriminately drawn from among those eligible in the community for jury service, untrammelled by any arbitrary and systematic exclusions."
