= Free Breakfast for Children =

American community service program

Free Breakfast for School Children Program
- Products: Breakfast
- Owner: Black Panther Party
- Country: United States
- Key people: Huey P. Newton, Fred Hampton
- Established: 1969

Huey P. Newton & Bobby Seale, founders of The Black Panther Party pictured in Oakland, CA. 1971

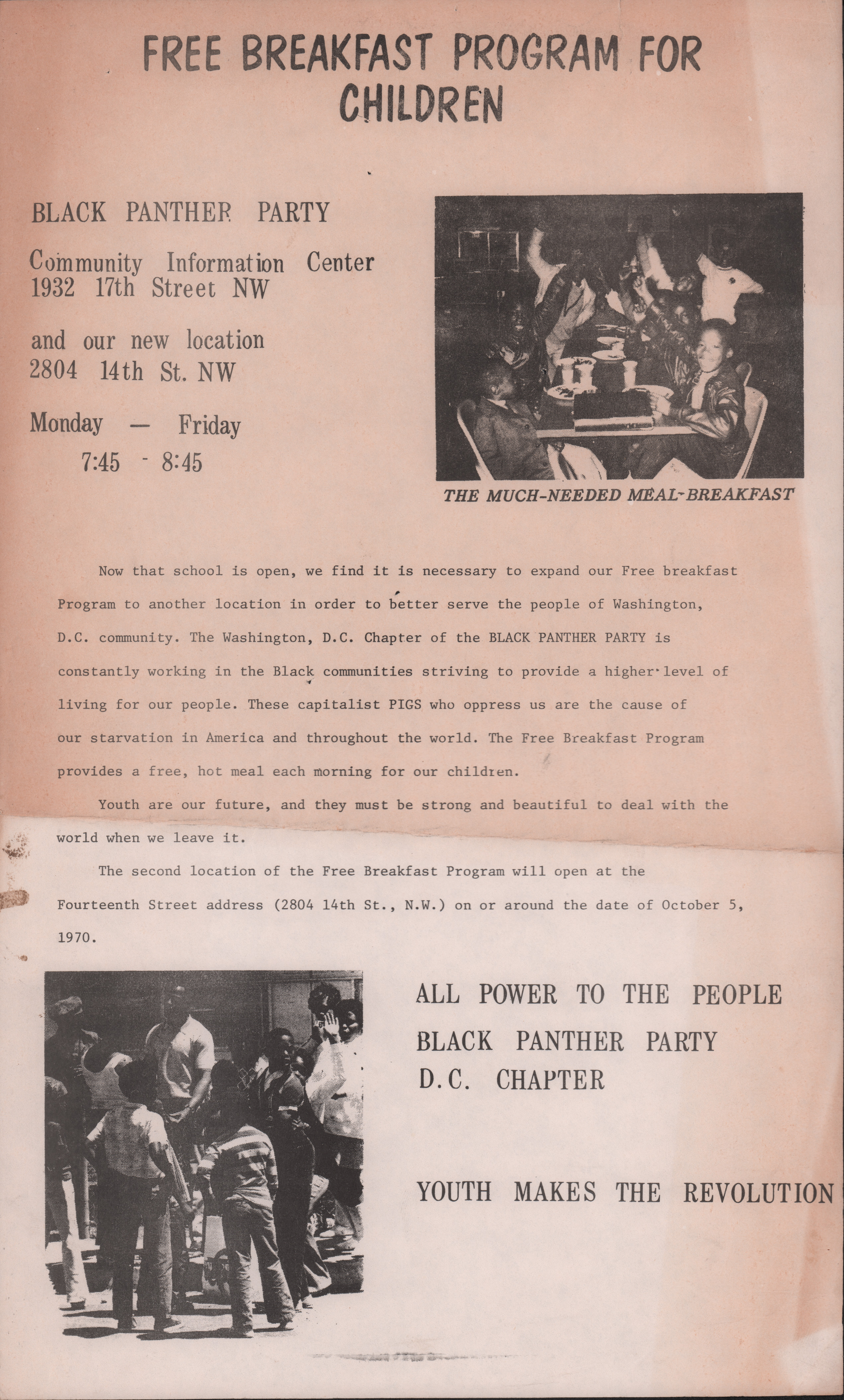
The flyer was released in June 1970, and it informs about the October 1970 opening of the new location of the party's free breakfast program for children.

The Free Breakfast for School Children Program, or the People's Free Food Program, was a community service program run by the Black Panther Party that focused on providing free breakfast for children every morning before school. The program began in January 1969 at Father Earl A. Neil's St. Augustine's Episcopal Church, located in West Oakland, California and spread throughout the nation. This program was an early manifestation of the social mission envisioned by Black Panther Party founders Huey P. Newton and Bobby Seale, along with their founding of the Oakland Community School, which provided high-level education to 150 children from impoverished urban neighborhoods. The breakfasts formed the core of what became known as the party's Survival Programs. Inspired by contemporary research about the essential role of breakfast for optimal schooling and the belief that alleviating hunger and poverty was necessary for Black liberation, the Panthers cooked and served food to the poor inner city youth of the area. The service created community centers in various cities for children and parents to simultaneously eat and learn more about black liberation and the Black Panther Party's efforts.

== History ==
The program was initiated in late January 1969 at St. Augustine's Episcopal Church in West Oakland, California. Two months later, in March 1969, the Black Panther Party opened its second Free Breakfast Program for Children at the Sacred Heart Church in San Francisco, California. The program became so popular that by the end of the year, the Panthers set up kitchens in cities across the US, claiming to have fed 20,000 children in 1969. By 1971, at least 36 Free Breakfast for Kids programs were running nationwide.

The Free Breakfast Program quickly became the central organizing activity of the Black Panther Party. The reach and success of the program highlighted the inadequacies of the federal government's then-flagging and under-resourced lunch programs in public schools across the country. The program allowed the children of West Oakland's poor neighborhoods to eat a healthy nourishing meal in a safe, supportive environment before school, optimizing their ability to learn. The party used the program to educate children and their families about anti-capitalism, Black pride, and developing revolutionary consciousness. Many of these programs were held in predominantly Black neighborhoods but also served children of other ethnicities. The program was mainly run by volunteers—both party members and non-affiliated community members, most of them women. Those working closely in the program made sure that the free breakfasts were a concrete assistance to the city's poor communities. They also shaped the program to be a powerful symbol of racial injustice and ghetto marginalization in America by teaching liberation lessons while children ate their meal. Volunteers would start setting up and preparing food around 6 am, and served the meal from 7-8:30. Most programs took place in churches, schools, or community centers. A typical breakfast often included some combination of bacon, eggs, grits, pancakes, toast, sausage, and a glass of juice or milk. Various chapters would also provide transportation for children, from home to the chapter's Free Breakfast site, then to school. To operate a local breakfast site, Black Panther Party chapters required a community space capable of accommodating at least 50 children alongside a consistent team of at least 10 volunteers. These volunteers were organized into specific operational roles, including preparing meals, greeting families, and managing neighborhood traffic to ensure children arrived at school safely.

During the late 1960s, the program also operated during a period of time where the push for welfare reform was strong and there was intense scrutiny for the National School Lunch Program which was heavily under-resourced. The success of the Free Breakfast for Children program highlighted the shortcomings of numerous federal policies and pushed for systemic change in American school nutrition.

== Survival Programs ==
The Free Breakfast for Children Program was one among more than 60 community social programs created by the Black Panther Party. They were renamed Survival Programs in 1971. These were operated by party members under the slogan, "Survival pending revolution". In addition to feeding school children, the party started People's Free Food Programs, delivering groceries, and encouraging community members to vote.

Following the creation of the breakfast program came the founding of Liberation Schools. The installment of the Intercommunal Youth Institute and the People's Free Medical Research Health Institute followed in 1970. The Sickle Cell Anemia Foundation, which provided free sickle cell anemia testing, came in 1971. Another Survival Program started by the Black Panther Party was referred to as "medical self-defense" with the creation of healthcare clinics and their own ambulance services. Other survival programs included children's development centers, free clothing, free busing to prisons, free housing cooperatives, free ambulances, etc.

These programs had multiple goals including drawing community members to political rallies, dramatizing social inequalities, providing needed community services, and educating people in the ideas and program of the party. The Survival Programs solidified the Panthers' standing in the larger community. The party's daily presence in the neighborhoods with breakfast, child care, and other programs changed the impression of the Panthers. They were seen as community leaders that actively worked to help the people around them. Beyond providing daily nutrition, the Black Panther Party framed the breakfast program as a political response to systemic state neglect and urban poverty. By connecting childhood hunger to broader issues of education and community self-determination, local chapters used the morning meal sites to organize residents and build grassroots support networks.

== Women's roles and contributions ==
Flier picturing and promoting the Black Panther Party Free Food Program, specifically at the Black Community Survival Conference. March 1972.

The Black Panther Party began as a predominantly male organization but came to include large numbers of women who joined the party who in many instances held crucial and defining roles within the structure and power of the Black Panther Party Organization, with some stating "the Panther women basically ran the headquarters".

Despite this however, gender roles still formed a very key issue within the Black Panther Party, among both male and female leaders and members of the party due to the gender roles and cultural stereotypes they themselves had internalized growing up within the United States, which affected the way they saw themselves and, in the case of males, the roles they thought that women should occupy within the party which fell largely along the roles of caretaking, cleaning, and cooking.

Although there was support among the public for the armed protection of black communities, the larger struggle of supporting the public was one that caused some dissent, but due to efforts of female Panther members such as Cleo Silver, eventually led to a shift in strategy and resources as the party moved away from solely supporting the idea of a swift overthrow of the existing power structure, and instead towards a dual strategy where the needs of the public were met and served as an opportunity to teach by example the message of the Black Panther Party. This was due to the fact that through canvassing of members of the public, female Panthers had discovered that their communities were concerned about security but also about day-to-day issues such as housing, food, and education, with breakfast being a key issue.

Panther Minister of Information Eldridge Cleaver, placing importance on the aspect of armed struggle and activities which were considered to be more masculine, had called the breakfast program a "sissy program" while visiting the office in New York. However, these views were rejected by, among other male members of the Black Panther Party, chairman Bobby Seale. In reply to Cleaver, Seale eventually convinced Cleaver to shift from armed struggle to community programs :

That's some one-dimension thinking, man. Voter registration and community programs unify the people, Eldridge. I'm here trying to organize people in opposition to the racist power structure fuckin’ over everybody and you're here trying to be some macho dude with these kids, these young women, and these men out there because you've been in a shootout.

— Bobby Seale, (Cope, Suzanne (2021) - Power Hungry - p 273)

After the program was launched, the role of women within the party was somewhat complex due to the fact that female members within the party themselves also conformed to prevalent gender roles which placed them in the roles of cooking, cleaning and administrative work. Women within the Panthers often filled these roles, but it has been argued that despite this, through these roles and their key positions within the party, were able to drive the Black Panther Party towards a more compassionate and balanced communitarian policy based on the weight of their contributions—and away from the sole policy of a swift overthrow of the existing power structures. It has been argued that this turn towards communitarian and populist policies made the Panthers and their ideology more influential in their communities, which made them more of a target of the FBI due to their threat to the existing power structure.

Despite the crucial role that women such as Afeni Shakur played within the party – who was seen largely as a balance between a caring and compassionate woman and a strong, capable leader – a large number of women did play a role within the party which was dictated by societal gender roles and were expected by male Panthers within leadership positions to work in support roles such as performing childcare, cooking and cleaning, despite their crucial roles as community organising, logistics and outreach which distinguished them as important members of the party.

An example of this disparity is outlined by former Panther Cleo Silver, who stated that in some of the photo ops intended as propaganda for the party often showed male Panthers serving the children meals, which excluded women from the plaudits of the successes of the programs. Some female members of the Panthers have said this was also due to the fact that the female Panthers did not want these plaudits and were invested in the activities to help their communities. Largely however, the gender expectation was that women's duties and responsibilities consisted of maternal roles in the program's kitchens and serving roles, further highlighting the gender struggles within the Black Panther Party.

The involvement of the women within their BPP chapters was greater than what they have been recognized for within their communities. A notable contribution to the party's mission towards providing free services such as the Free Breakfast for Children program was made by Frankye Adams-Johnson, co-founder of the White Plains Black Panther Party chapter.

Similar to the responsibilities and jobs designated to the men, many of these duties in the White Plains chapter were fulfilled by women in the party. Specifically looking at their Free Breakfast for Children program, Johnson's chapter organized and coordinated the logistics of this program, securing food donations and managing operations. The women were also responsible for cooking nutritious meals and ensuring they met dietary needs. The existence of Black Panther Party chapters founded and run by women showed equal commitment to what the Party stood for. Moreover, women-based Free Breakfast programs within chapters founded by women helped to lessen the stereotypes often associated with women's roles in the Party.

== Locations ==
=== Oakland ===
The Black Panther Party initially announced their intentions to begin the Free Breakfast for Children Program in September 1968 and the first program was officially launched at St. Augustine's Episcopal Church in Oakland, CA in late January 1969. Parishioner Ruth Beckford-Smith was in charge of this first program.

Beckford-Smith, working with Father Earl A. Neil, constructed a healthy menu that would nourish children and created a kitchen and dining hall that passed health inspections. The program's launch day served 11 children and gained popularity, as by the end of the week 135 children were being served daily at St. Augustine's Episcopal Church. The program's success influenced other chapters of the Black Panther Party, and soon the Free Breakfast Program was mandatory in all chapters nationwide.

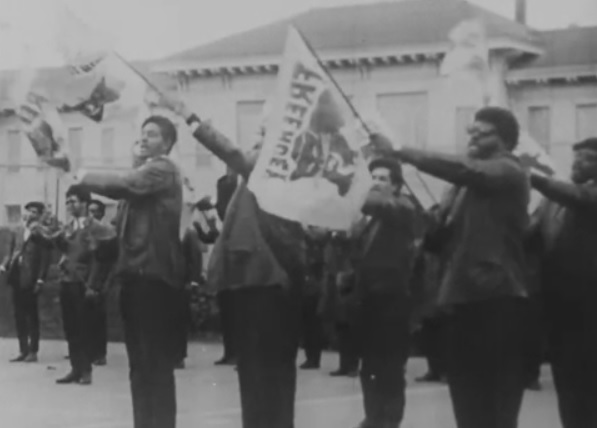
Students demonstrate a protest at the Alameda County Courthouse, Oakland, California.

=== Chicago ===
Fred Hampton, leader of the Chicago local, helped organize several community programs. These included five different breakfast programs on the West Side, a free medical center, a door to door program of health services (which offered testing for sickle cell anemia), and blood drives for the Cook County Hospital. The Chicago party also reached out to local gangs to clean up their acts, get them away from crime and bring them into the class war. The Party's efforts met with wide success, and Hampton's audiences and organized contingent grew by the day.

The Illinois chapter of the Free Breakfast program served more than 400 children every morning. The success of this program motivated government entities to act as shown in the city of Chicago's choice to use federal funds to provide hot breakfast to poor children across the city. In addition to that, the BPP free health care clinics across Chicago motivated party members to make appeals to the Chicago Board of Health advocating for similar clinics in impoverished areas in Chicago.

=== Seattle ===
The Washington chapter of the Black Panther Party experienced support from Seattle-native Jimi Hendrix. He would often send donations to the Seattle chapter of the BPP's free breakfast program. The Washington chapter's decision to also serve white and Asian families, led to broad community support, allowing the chapter to expand to five different locations. Beyond providing free meals, the Washington chapter sent out free groceries every Wednesday to families in the Seattle community.

The Seattle chapter of the Black Panther Party met the needs of numerous ethnic groups because the black population in Seattle was not as high as in other areas. The attention to their specific community needs earned the Seattle chapter a reputation of being influential both in Washington and in the United States in general. The Seattle, Washington chapter's free breakfast program lasted longer than the majority of other programs and continued operations past the chapter's official closing date in 1977.

=== Kansas City ===
The Kansas City chapter of the Black Panther Party was led by Peter O’Neal and was composed of working-class, underclass, and middle-class African Americans. Originally the Kansas City chapter of the BPP was known as the "Black Vigilantes." However, when they gained formal admission to the BPP they changed their name. The main focus of the Kansas City chapter was the discontentment of the African American working class, black youth, and building survival programs.

The Kansas City chapter of the Black Panther Party successfully started two sites where free breakfast for school children was offered. In order to keep the program going, members of the Kansas City chapter visited local entrepreneurs and requested donations. The support they received allowed the Kansas City chapter to not only feed the black community but also offer political education classes and free health screenings.

=== Des Moines ===
The Des Moines, Iowa chapter of the Black Panther Party was successful in organizing a free breakfast program for children. The Des Moines Panthers fed elementary and junior high school children of different races and backgrounds. In order to continue to fund the breakfast program in Des Moines churches of all denominations would donate food and money.

Along with organizing a free breakfast program for children, the Des Moines chapter also organized health programs for adults. Under the leadership of Mary Rhem, the Des Moines chapter was successful in not only making their survival programs successful but also making their work known to the public. Thanks to multiple members of the Des Moines chapter making connections with community groups, their work and goals were spread to the public. The local paper, The Des Moines Register, covered the work of the breakfast program in Des Moines.

=== Houston ===
The chapter of the Black Panther Party in Houston, Texas took three waves to establish between 1968 and 1974, until their chapter was recognized as an official BPP chapter. The implementation of the Houston chapter didn't gain importance in their community until Carl Hampton established the People's Party II (PP II) in 1970; his murder would play a pivotal role in their chapter gaining membership. By October 1971, PP II members received authorization to establish the Houston BPP branch. This final formation lasted approximately three years before it was forced to dissolve in August 1974, following orders from the national BPP leadership to relocate to Oakland.

During the final wave of the Houston chapter's implementation, they were able to fully perform the roles and responsibilities similar to other more prominent chapters. While the free pest control project was a program that remained successful through their recognition phase, they were finally able to include the large programs that were run in the other Party's chapters—free food giveaways, and sickle cell anemia and other preventive testing. One of their most successful programs—after many failed attempts at implementation—was the Free Breakfast for Children Program implemented in March 1973. While other chapters had support from their local churches for the Free Breakfast program, the Houston chapter lacked this support from their local churches. Since the members of the Houston chapter were determined to provide this program for their community, their first program was held in the Dew Drop Inn, a neighborhood beer joint on Dowling Street.

=== New Orleans ===
The New Orleans Chapter of the Black Panther Party helped create new possibilities for race relations and prison activism after the destruction of Hurricane Katrina and Hurricane Betsy. The Black Panther Party's survival programs attracted attention across the world. In 1970, the Central Committee agreed to let Geronimo Pratt send Steve Green, Harold Joseph Holmes, and George Lloyd to help launch the New Orleans branch of the BPP. The New Orleans Chapter of the Black Panther Party was made up of a younger New Orleanians, most in their late teens and early twenties and the oldest member being twenty-two years old.

The New Orleans chapter held political education classes and were considered dangerous and of great concern by the FBI. Barbara Guyton was the breakfast coordinator in New Orleans where many children were fed daily. At breakfast, they were exposed to the Panthers' Ten Point Program and Platform where they taught children about lessons in black history. The Black Panther Party's New Orleans chapter stood for change in violence and police brutality, helping society, and helping today's youth in their education.

== FBI harassment ==
In response to its successes, the FBI launched efforts to discredit and derail the Free Breakfast Program. As part of their COINTELPRO activities targeting the Black Panthers, FBI operatives spread rumors of poisoned food, and the police raided breakfast program locations while children were eating.

The program had attracted FBI director J. Edgar Hoover's attention because of its success in gaining the support of many Black parents and liberal whites. Hoover considered the program a threat because he viewed it "as a front for indoctrinating children with Panther propaganda." He wrote: "The [Program] represents the best and most influential activity going for the BPP and, as such, is potentially the greatest threat to efforts by authorities to neutralize the BPP and destroy what it stands for". As a result, many law enforcement agencies, including local police departments, joined the FBI in harassing and discrediting the program and the people it benefited.

J Edgar Hoover went as far as to call the Black Panther Party a "national hate group" and the Free Breakfast for Children program an "act of subversion". Once the initiative caught the FBI's eye the program made sure to consult with nutritionists to provide "high quality, balanced meals, and made sure they had the necessary permits from the health and fire departments for the kitchens and halls where they served meals, they became regular targets of local officials." Yet this effort could not save the program as they were "summarily dismantled."

== Legacy ==
The success of the Black Panther Party's Free Breakfast for Children program helped reduce hunger and food insecurity in local communities, while pressuring state and federal governments to expand their own services. The program showed the government's failure in the War on Poverty and the ongoing impact of childhood hunger. Beyond providing relief regarding nutrition in low-income areas, these programs were purposefully designed to incorporate politics into the fight for food, the Black Panther Party framed this widespread malnutrition into a problem that the state caused.

However, it would be a decade or more before such free breakfast programs, following the inspiration of the widespread success and popular support gained by the BPP's programs, would become almost universally available to poor children through the US government. In California, the party pushed then-Governor Ronald Reagan's administration to create a statewide free breakfast program. While the federally funded School Breakfast Program for underprivileged children was first piloted in 1966 by the US Department of Agriculture, Congress only permanently authorized it in 1975. However, the California campaign for a free breakfast program had the underlining objective of this state-wide implementation was to seize the political power the Black Panther Party had gained through their survival programs. Additionally, the implementation of this government-funded free breakfast program would cause controversy due to budget cuts made during Reagan's presidency which would lead to widespread poverty across the United States.

Supported by donations from local businesses, churches, and individual community members, the Oakland program expanded from serving 11 children on its first day to 135 by the end of its first week. By demonstrating that grassroots community organizing could directly address childhood hunger, the program generated public pressure that contributed to Congress permanently authorizing the federal USDA School Breakfast Program in 1975.

== See also ==
- Child Nutrition Act
- National School Lunch Act
- Food justice movement
