= Ten-Point Program (Black Panther Party) =

Foundational document for the Black Panther Party

The Ten-Point Program or The Black Panther Party for Self-Defense Ten-Point Platform and Program is a party platform written by Huey P. Newton and Bobby Seale in 1966 for the Black Panther Party.

== Description ==
The Ten-Point Program is a set of guidelines to the Black Panther Party that states their ideals and ways of operation, a "combination of the Bill of Rights and the Declaration of Independence".

The document was created in 1966 by the founders of the Black Panther Party, Huey P. Newton and Bobby Seale, whose political thoughts lay within the realm of Marxism and Black Nationalism. Each one of the statements was put in place for all of the Black Panther Party members to live by and actively practice every day. The Ten-Point program was released on May 15, 1967, in the second issue of the party's weekly newspaper, The Black Panther. All succeeding 537 issues contained the program, titled "What We Want Now!."

The Ten Point Program comprised two sections: the first, titled "What We Want Now!" described what the Black Panther Party wants from the leaders of American society. The second section, titled "What We Believe," outlines the philosophical views of the party and the rights that African Americans should have, but are denied. It is structured similarly to the United States Bill of Rights of the U.S. Constitution.

"What We Believe" expands on the first section, making demands of what will be deemed sufficient payment for the injustices committed against the Black Community. For example, one section states that, "We believe that this racist government has robbed us and now we are demanding the overdue debt of forty acres and two mules. Forty acres and two mules were promised 100 years ago as a restitution for slave labor and mass murder of black people". It continues to state that "We will accept this payment in currency which will be distributed to our many communities." Newton and Seale believed that the Black community had been deprived of these benefits over the years, and that the only way to correct this injustice was in repayment of assets that had been lost to them over many years of slavery.

The ten-point platform was important for the Black Panther Party because it laid out the "physical needs and all the philosophical principles" they expected and that could be understood by everyone. When Huey Newton talked about the platform, he stated that these things were not something new but something that "black people have been voicing all along for over 100 years since the Emancipation Proclamation and even before that." This platform was essential to the party, because it allowed for them to state their wants, needs, and beliefs that people could read and easily understand.

== Contents ==
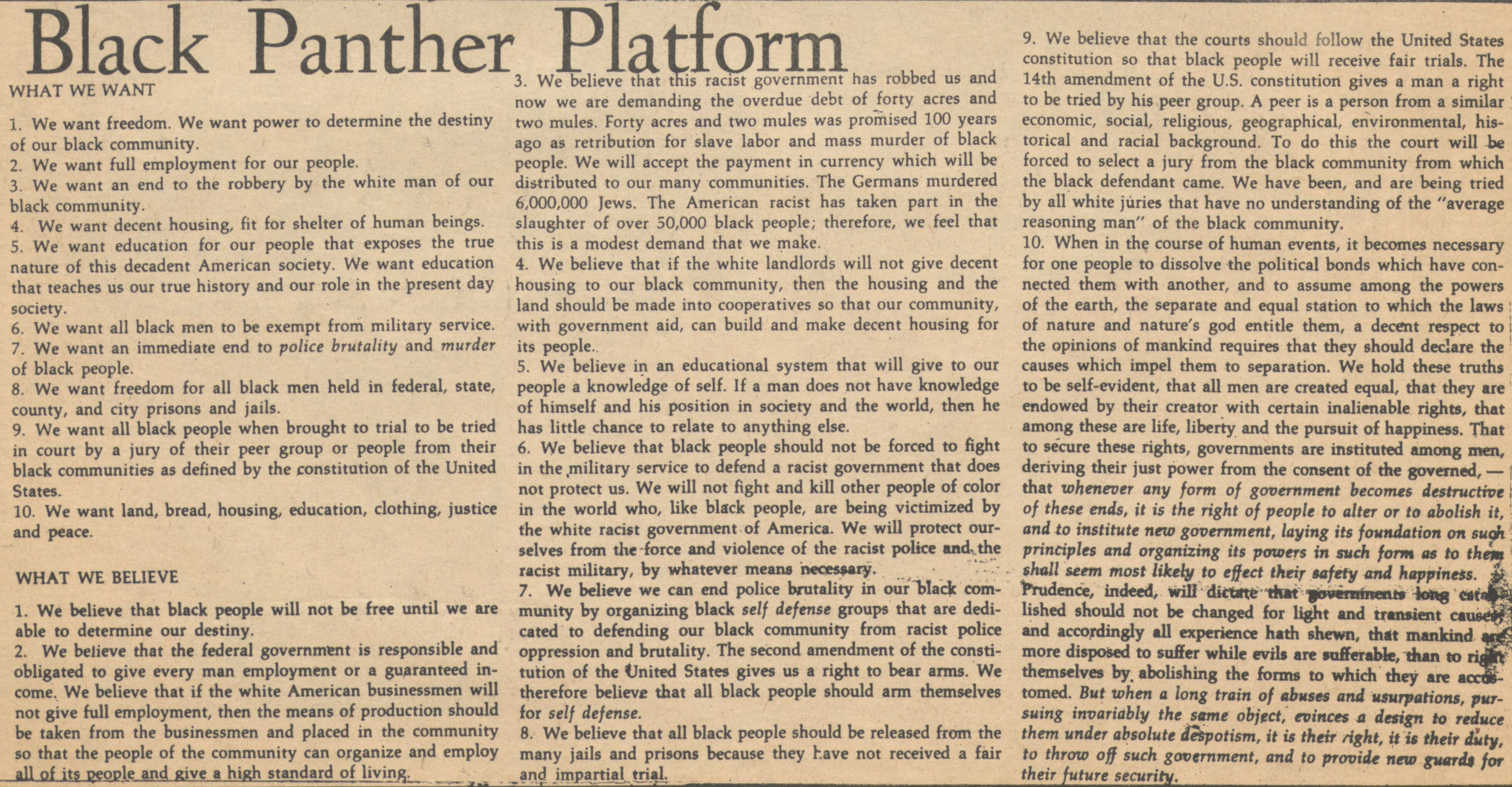
The Black Panther Party Platform (Ten-Point Program) as reprinted in the Seattle underground paper Helix, May 9, 1968

The 10 Point Program was a living document, and as such, there are multiple versions of it published. A version reads the following:

"1. We want freedom. We want power to determine the destiny of our black and oppressed communities.

We believe that black and oppressed people will not be free until we are able to determine our destinies in our own communities ourselves, by fully controlling all the institutions which exist in our communities.

2. We want full employment for our people.

We believe that the federal government is responsible and obligated to give every person employment or a guaranteed income. We believe that if the American businessmen will not give full employment, then the technology and means of production should be taken from the businessmen and placed in the community so that the people of the community can organize and employ all of its people and give a high standard of living.

3. We want an end to the robbery by the capitalist of our black and oppressed communities.

We believe that this racist government has robbed us and now we are demanding the overdue debt of forty acres and two mules. Forty acres and two mules were promised 100 years ago as restitution for slave labor and mass murder of black people. We will accept the payment in currency which will be distributed to our many communities. The Germans murdered 6,000,000 Jews. The American racist has taken part in the slaughter of over 50,000,000 black people; therefore, we feel this is a modest demand that we make.

4. We want decent housing, fit for the shelter of human beings.

We believe that if the landlords will not give decent housing to our Black and oppressed communities, then the housing and the land should be made into cooperatives so that the people in our communities, with government aid, can build and make decent housing for the people.

5. We want education for our people that exposes the true nature of this decadent American society. We want education that teaches us our true history and our role in the present-day society.

We believe in an educational system that will give to our people a knowledge of self. If you do not have knowledge of yourself and your position in the society and the world, then you will have little chance to know anything else.

6. We Want All Black Men To Be Exempt From Military Service.

We believe that Black people should not be forced to fight in the military service to defend a racist government that does not protect us. We will not fight and kill other people of color in the world who, like Black people, are being victimized by the White racist government of America. We will protect ourselves from the force and violence of the racist police and the racist military by whatever means necessary.

6. (alternate) We want completely free health care for all black and oppressed people.

We believe that the government must provide, free of charge, for the people, health facilities which will not only treat our illnesses, most of which have come about as a result of our oppression, but which will also develop preventative medical programs to guarantee our future survival. We believe that mass health education and research programs must be developed to give all black and oppressed people access to advanced scientific and medical information, so we may provide ourselves with proper medical attention and care.

7. We want an immediate end to police brutality and murder of black in the United States.

We believe that the racist and fascist government of the United States uses its domestic enforcement agencies to carry out its program of oppression against black people, other people of color and poor people inside the United States. We believe it is our right, therefore, to defend ourselves against such armed forces, and that all black and oppressed people should be armed for self-defense of our homes and communities against these fascist police forces.

8. We Want Freedom For All Black Men Held In Federal, State, County And City Prisons And Jails.

We believe that all Black people should be released from the many jails and prisons because they have not received a fair and impartial trial.

8. (alternate) We want an immediate end to all wars of aggression.

We believe that the various conflicts which exist around the world stem directly from the aggressive desires of the U.S. ruling circle and government to force its domination upon the oppressed people of the world. We believe that if the U.S. government or its lackeys do not cease these aggressive wars that it is the right of the people to defend themselves by any means necessary against their aggressors.

9. We want freedom for all black and poor oppressed people now held in U.S. federal, state, county, city and military prisons and jails. We want trials by a jury of peers for all persons charged with so-called crimes under the laws of this country.

We believe that the many black and poor oppressed people now held in U.S. prisons and jails have not received fair and impartial trials under a racist and fascist judicial system and should be free from incarceration. We believe in the ultimate elimination of all wretched, inhuman penal institutions, because the masses of men and women imprisoned inside the United States or by the U.S. military are the victims of oppressive conditions which are the real cause of their imprisonment. We believe that when persons are brought to trial that they must be guaranteed, by the United States, juries of their peers, attorneys of their choice and freedom from imprisonment while awaiting trials.

10. We want land, bread, housing, education, clothing, justice, peace and people’s community control of modern technology.

When in the course of human events, it becomes necessary for one people to dissolve the political bands which have connected them with another, and to assume, among the powers of the earth, the separate and equal station to which the laws of nature and nature’s God entitle them, a decent respect to the opinions of mankind requires that they should declare the causes which impel them to the separation.

We hold these truths to be self-evident, that all men are created equal; that they are endowed by their Creator with certain unalienable rights; that among these are life, liberty, and the pursuit of happiness. That, to secure these rights, governments are instituted among men, deriving their just powers from the consent of the governed; that, whenever any form of government becomes destructive of these ends, it is the right of the people to alter or to abolish it, and to institute a new government, laying its foundation on such principles, and organizing its powers in such form, as to them shall seem most likely to effect their safety and happiness. Prudence, indeed, will dictate that governments long established should not be changed for light and transient causes; and, accordingly, all experience hath shown that mankind are more disposed to suffer, while evils are sufferable, than to right themselves by abolishing the forms to which they are accustomed. But, when a long train of abuses and usurpations, pursuing invariably the same object, evinces a design to reduce them under absolute despotism, it is their right, it is their duty, to throw off such government, and to provide new guards for their future security."

== Legacy ==
The Ten-Point Program formed the basis for the Black Panther Party and was seen as the governing document that defined the actions of the Party. In addition, a highly symbolic photo of Huey P. Newton was circulated alongside the Ten Point Program. He is wearing the famous Black Panther black cap, tilted to the side, and covering his right ear, and dressed in the standard Black Panther uniform. "He sits comfortably, but alert, his feet positioned, ready to stand."

In 1970, Newton shifted the focus of his political activities from Black Nationalism to "intercommunalism," seeking to unite and empower all disenfranchised groups. In 1972 the Ten Point Program was modified to reflect this changing focus—for instance, adding a demand for completely free health care — leading to tension within the party. The Party had changed from merely focusing on Blacks themselves to now focusing on more minority groups and how to improve their lives. Focusing on injustices, they began to see their struggle as one that many people faced.

The Ten-Point Program played a meaningful role in the development of the civil rights movement in the United States during the 1960s and 70s, and also influenced the political outlook of those who came of age in the post-civil rights era and the hip-hop generation. Notably, rap music artist Tupac Shakur, the son of former Black Panther Afeni Shakur, loosely based his philosophy of T.H.U.G.L.I.F.E.—"an attempt to codify practices that could reduce violence in the Black community and restore dignity to humiliated, disrespected, and disowned Black men"—on insights from the Ten-Point Program.
