= Rockville, Alabama =

- Census-designated place
- Location of Rockville in Clarke County, Alabama.
- Coordinates: 31°25′13″N 87°50′33″W
- Country: United States
- State: Alabama
- County: Clarke

Area
  - Total: 2.81 sq mi (7.27 km^{2})
  - Land: 2.81 sq mi (7.27 km^{2})
  - Water: 0 sq mi (0.00 km^{2})
- Elevation: 308 ft (94 m)

Population (2020)
  - Total: 47
  - Density: 16.8/sq mi (6.47/km^{2})
- Time zone: UTC-6 (Central (CST))
  - Summer (DST): UTC-5 (CDT)
- Area code: 251
- GNIS feature ID: 2632283

Rockville is a census-designated place and in Clarke County, Alabama, United States. Its population was 47 as of the 2020 census.

== History ==
In 1920, Rockville had a school, church, and post office. The Jackson Sawmill Company operated a dummy line in Rockville from 1922 to 1927.

== Demographics ==
Historical population
Census	Pop.	Note	%±
2010	43		—
2020	47		9.3%
U.S. Decennial Census

Rockville was listed as a census designated place in the 2010 U.S. census.

Rockville CDP, Alabama – Racial and ethnic composition Note: the US Census treats Hispanic/Latino as an ethnic category. This table excludes Latinos from the racial categories and assigns them to a separate category. Hispanics/Latinos may be of any race.
Race / Ethnicity (NH = Non-Hispanic)	Pop 2010	Pop 2020	% 2010	% 2020
White alone (NH)	41	41	95.35%	87.23%
Black or African American alone (NH)	1	5	2.33%	10.64%
Native American or Alaska Native alone (NH)	0	1	0.00%	2.13%
Asian alone (NH)	0	0	0.00%	0.00%
Native Hawaiian or Pacific Islander alone (NH)	0	0	0.00%	0.00%
Other race alone (NH)	0	0	0.00%	0.00%
Mixed race or Multiracial (NH)	0	0	0.00%	0.00%
Hispanic or Latino (any race)	1	0	2.33%	0.00%
Total	43	47	100.00%	100.00%
