= Peacock chair =

Type of furniture

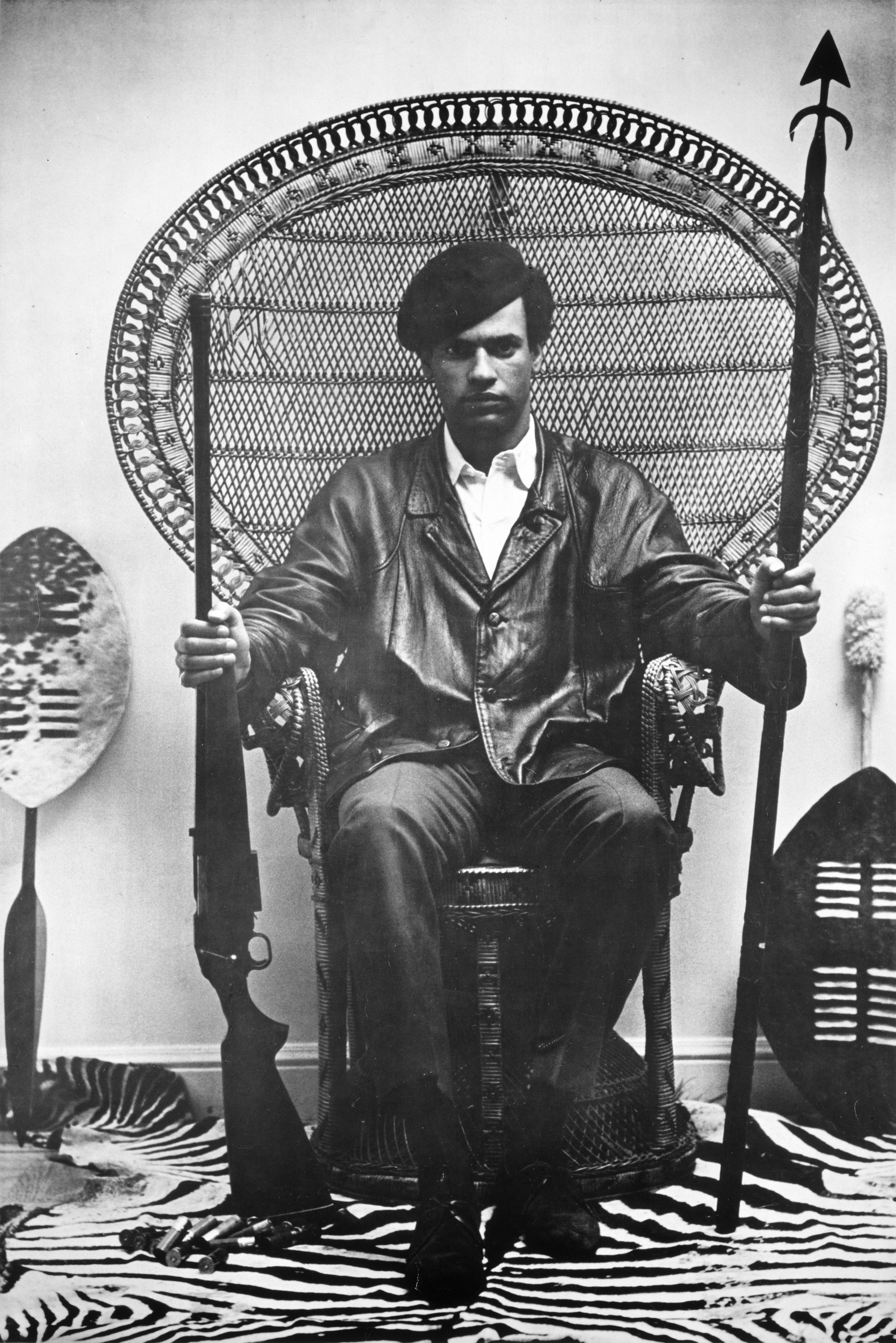
Black Panther Party leader Huey P. Newton on a peacock chair, in a 1967 portrait photograph by Blair Stapp

The peacock chair is a chair made of woven rattan or bamboo with a flared back, originated in the Philippines. It became popular in the United States and abroad during the 20th century, as a thronelike symbol of status, being featured in photographies with politicians, revolutionary leaders, actors and musicians.

== History ==
The peacock chair is one of several wicker chair designs to have originated from The Philippines and popularized in the US after the 1876's Philadelphia Centennial Exhibition.

This design originated in The Philippines, as a chair produced by inmates of the Bilibid prison in the early 20th century. During the American colonial period, the prison was espoused by colonizers as a 'benevolent' institution, where prisoners in rehabilitation programs made articles like furniture, silverware and baskets. The products were displayed for sale at the prison workshop and sold to tourists.

One of the first peacock chair photos to popularize the model was featured in the May 16–17, 1914, edition of the El Paso Herald, showing a female inmate from the Philippines seated with her baby.

== Design ==
The chair has an hourglass shaped base, lifted arms and a woven flared back resembling a peacock's tail. The design of the chair is often associated with mid-century modern furniture, known for its bold and elegant silhouette. Its striking appearance, with the intricately woven back and open frame, evokes the grace and grandeur of a peacock's plumage, making it a symbol of luxury and artistic flair. The chair has gained recognition in pop culture, frequently appearing in various artistic and fashion contexts.

== Symbol in popular culture ==
The peacock chair was also featured within many popular television shows that were produced in the United States, like Morticia Addams's chair in the 1964 television series The Addams Family and the popular Hawaiian musician Don Ho prominently sat on his peacock chair while performing behind his keyboard during the 1976-1977 televised broadcast of his daytime variety program The Don Ho Show in the United States.

The peacock chair is also featured in motion picture films, such as My Fair Lady (1964), Emmanuelle (1972), Too Late The Hero (1970), Black Panther (2018), and Bohemian Rhapsody (2018).

The peacock chair was a trend in album covers for recorded music, such as Al Green's I'm Still in Love With You (1972), Dorothy Moore's Misty Blue (1976), Al Di Meola's Casino (1978), Funkadelic's Uncle Jam Wants You (1979) and Heaven 17's Play to Win (1981).

With the popularization of photography, photographers employed wicker chairs as a prop seat for its sturdy, lightweight appearance. The peacock chair acquired a status symbol, with its thronelike appearance, favored for shoots with politicians, artists and celebrities. The 1967 Blair Stapp photograph of Huey P. Newton, founder of the Black Panther Party, sitting on the chair with a spear in one hand and a rifle in the other, became especially notable as a Black power movement icon.
