= Huey P. Newton =

American founder of the Black Panther Party (1942–1989)

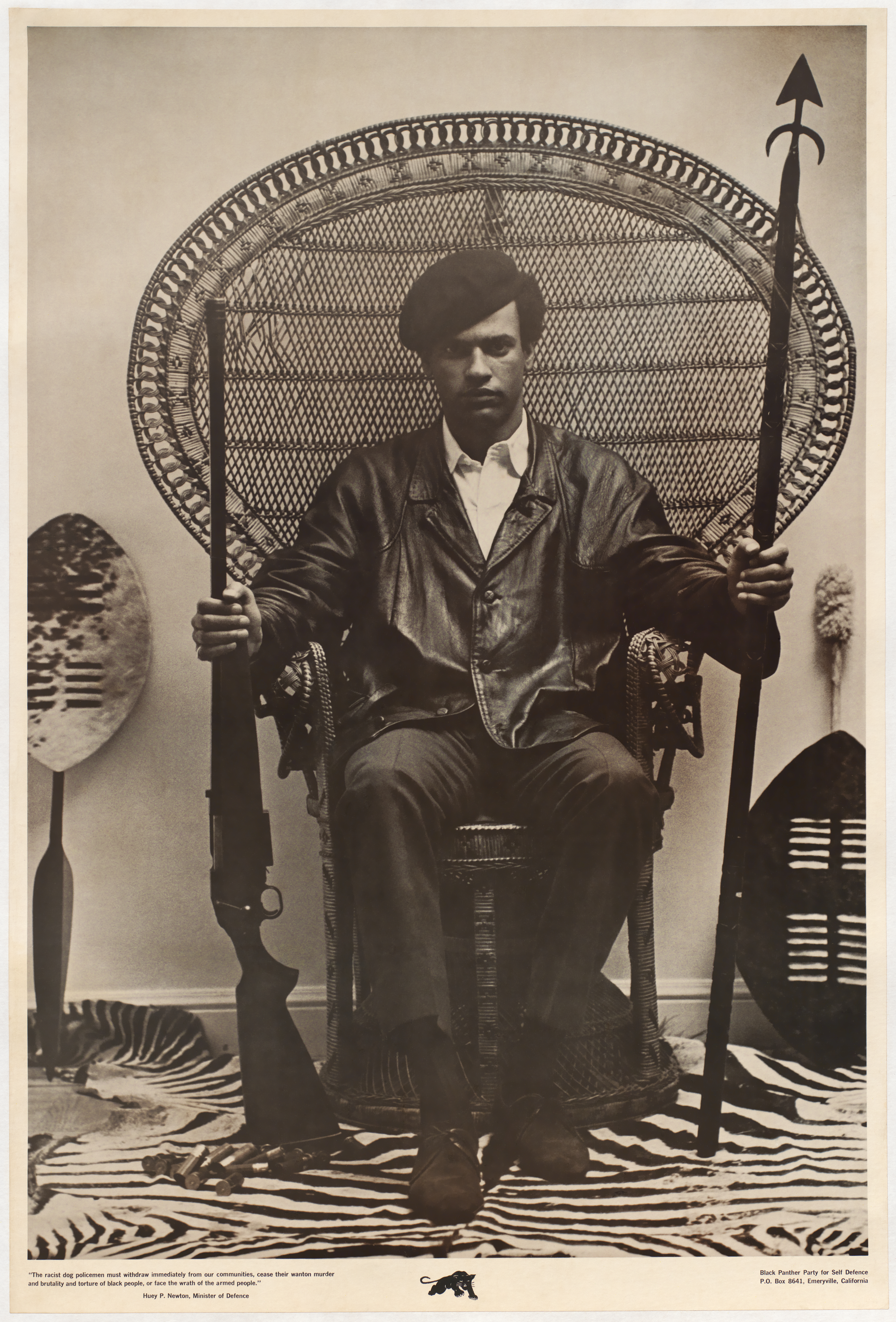
- Poster featuring a portrait photograph of Newton sitting in a rattan throne chair while wearing the Black Panther Party uniform and holding a shotgun and a spear, c. 1967. In the background are Zulu shields. Beneath him is a zebra-print rug.

Leader of the Black Panther Party
- In office October 1966 – 1982
- Preceded by: Position established
- Succeeded by: Position abolished

Personal details
- Born: Huey Percy Newton; February 17, 1942 Monroe, Louisiana, U.S.
- Died: August 22, 1989 (aged 47) Oakland, California, U.S.
- Cause of death: Assassination by gunshot
- Spouses: Gwen Fountaine (m. 1975; div. 1982) Fredrika Slaughter (m. 1984)
- Children: 3
- Education: Merritt College (AA); San Francisco Law School; University of California, Santa Cruz (BA, MA, PhD)
- Occupation: Activist
- Known for: Founding the Black Panther Party

Huey Percy Newton (February 17, 1942 – August 22, 1989) was an African American revolutionary and political activist who co-founded the Marxist–Leninist political and militant organization the Black Panther Party with fellow activist Bobby Seale in 1966. He ran the party as its main leader and helped craft its ten-point manifesto. Under his leadership, the party organized numerous social programs and community events and advocated for collective defense.

Newton stated that Plato's Republic influenced his philosophy of activism. He went on to earn a PhD in social philosophy from the University of California, Santa Cruz's History of Consciousness program in 1980.

Newton was tried for, but ultimately not convicted of, the criminal homicides of a police officer and a prostitute. Newton was convicted of, and incarcerated on separate occasions for, weapons and embezzlement offenses. He was accused of rape for which he was not convicted, and complicity in other targeted violence.

Newton was murdered in 1989 by Tyrone Robinson, a drug dealer and low-level member of the Black Guerrilla Family prison gang.

== Biography ==
=== Early life and education ===
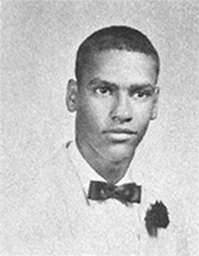
Newton's senior year yearbook photo, 1959

Newton was born in Monroe, Louisiana, in 1942 during World War II, the youngest child of Armelia Johnson and Walter Newton, a sharecropper and Baptist preacher. His parents named him after Huey Long, a former Governor of and United States Senator from Louisiana. The surrounding Ouachita Parish has had a history of violence against Black people since the Reconstruction era.

To escape the violence of Louisiana, the Newton family migrated to Oakland, California, participating in the second wave of the Great Migration of African Americans out of the South. The family was close-knit but quite poor, and they moved often within the San Francisco Bay Area during Newton's childhood. Despite this, Newton said he never went without food and shelter as a child. As a teenager, he was arrested several times, including for gun possession and vandalism at age 14. Growing up in Oakland, Newton stated that he was "made to feel ashamed of being black".

In his autobiography Revolutionary Suicide, he wrote:

During those long years in Oakland public schools, I did not have one teacher who taught me anything relevant to my own life or experience. Not one instructor ever awoke in me a desire to learn more or to question or to explore the worlds of literature, science, and history. All they did was try to rob me of the sense of my own uniqueness and worth, and in the process nearly killed my urge to inquire.

Newton graduated from Oakland Technical High School in 1959 while being functionally illiterate. He later learned to read through the help of his older brother Melvin Newton reading him poetry as well as studying Plato's Republic. He attended Merritt College, where he earned an Associate of Arts degree in 1966. Plato's Republic influenced Newton's early adult world view; he told the court during the trial for the killing of officer John Frey, that he had learned to read from studying the Republic. After that, he started "questioning everything". In his autobiography, Revolutionary Suicide, he states: "Most of all, I questioned what was happening in my own family and in the community around me."

Newton continued his education, studying at San Francisco Law School, and the University of California, Santa Cruz, where he earned a bachelor's degree. He was a member of Phi Beta Sigma fraternity. In 1978, while in prison, Newton met evolutionary biologist Robert Trivers after Newton applied to do a reading course with Trivers as part of a graduate degree in history of consciousness. He and Trivers became close friends, they published an analysis of the role of flight crew self-deception in the 1982 crash of Air Florida Flight 90, and Trivers dedicated one chapter of his autobiography to his relationship with Newton. He later continued his studies and, in 1980, he completed a PhD in social philosophy at Santa Cruz.

=== Founding of the Black Panther Party ===
As a student at Merritt College in Oakland, Newton became involved in Bay Area politics. He joined the Afro-American Association (AAA), became a prominent member of Phi Beta Sigma fraternity's Beta Tau chapter, and played a role in getting the first African-American history course adopted as part of the college's curriculum. Newton learned about black history from Donald Warden (who later would change his name to Khalid Abdullah Tariq Al-Mansour), the leader of the AAA. In later life, Newton concluded that Warden offered solutions that didn't work. In his autobiography, Newton says of Warden, "The mass media, the oppressors, give him public exposure for only one reason: he will lead the people away from the truth of their situation." In college, Newton read the works of Karl Marx, Vladimir Lenin, Frantz Fanon, Malcolm X, Mao Zedong, Émile Durkheim, and Che Guevara. Newton began following developments in China following Mao's August 8, 1963 Statement Supporting the Afro-American in their Just Struggle Against Racial Discrimination by US Imperialism.

During his time at Merritt College, he met Bobby Seale, with whom he co-founded the Black Panther Party for Self Defense (BPP) in October 1966. Based on a casual conversation, Seale became chairman and Newton became minister of defense. The Black Panther Party was an African-American left-wing organization advocating for the right of self-defense for black people in the United States. The Black Panther Party's beliefs were greatly influenced by Malcolm X. Newton stated: "Therefore, the words on this page cannot convey the effect that Malcolm has had on the Black Panther Party, although, as far as I am concerned, the Party is a living testament to his life work." The party achieved national and international renown through their deep involvement in the Black Power movement and the politics of the 1960s and 1970s.

1968 newsreel with Kathleen Cleaver at Hutton Memorial Park in Alameda County, California. The footage also shows a student protest demonstration at Alameda County Courthouse, Oakland, California. Black Panther Party leaders Huey P. Newton, Eldridge Cleaver, and Bobby Seale spoke on the Ten-Point Program they wanted from the administration, which was to include full employment, decent housing and education, an end to police brutality, and black people to be exempt from the military.

The party's political goals, including better housing, jobs, and education for African Americans, were documented in their Ten-Point Program, a set of guidelines to the Black Panther Party's ideals and ways of operation. The group believed that violence – or the threat of it – might be needed to bring about social change. They sometimes made news with a show of force, as they did when they entered the California Legislature fully armed in order to protest a gun bill aimed at disarming them.

Under Newton's leadership, the Black Panther Party founded over 60 community support programs (renamed "survival programs" in 1971) including food banks, medical clinics, sickle cell anemia testing, prison busing for families of inmates, legal advice seminars, clothing banks, housing cooperatives, and their own ambulance service. The most famous of these programs was the Free Breakfast for Children program which fed thousands of impoverished children daily during the early 1970s. Newton also co-founded the Black Panther newspaper service, which became one of America's most widely distributed African-American newspapers.

Newton adopted what he termed "revolutionary humanism". Although he had previously attended Nation of Islam mosques, he wrote that "I have had enough of religion and could not bring myself to adopt another one. I needed a more concrete understanding of social conditions. References to God or Allah did not satisfy my stubborn thirst for answers." Later, however, he stated that "As far as I am concerned, when all of the questions are not answered, when the extraordinary is not explained, when the unknown is not known, then there is room for God because the unexplained and the unknown is God." Newton later decided to join a Christian church after the party disbanded during his marriage to Fredrika.

According to Bobby Seale, in 1967 he and Newton obtained copies of Quotations from Chairman Mao Zedong from the Chinese Book Store in San Francisco to sell at University of California, Berkeley. With the proceeds, they purchased weapons to arm BPP members for self-defense against police brutality.

Newton would frequent pool halls, campuses, bars and other locations deep in the black community where people gathered in order to organize and recruit for the Panthers. While recruiting, Newton sought to educate those around him about the legality of self-defense. One of the reasons, he argued, why Black people continued to be persecuted was their lack of knowledge of the social institutions that could be made to work in their favor. In Newton's autobiography, Revolutionary Suicide, he writes: "Before I took Criminal Evidence in school, I had no idea what my rights were."

Newton also wrote in his autobiography, "I tried to transform many of the so-called criminal activities going on in the street into something political, although this had to be done gradually." He attempted to channel these "daily activities for survival" into significant community actions. Eventually, the illicit activities of a few members would be superimposed on the social program work performed by the Panthers, and this mischaracterization would lose them some support in both black and white communities.

Newton and the Panthers started a number of social programs in Oakland, including founding the Oakland Community School, which provided high-level education to 150 children from impoverished urban neighborhoods. Other Panther programs included the Free Breakfast for Children Program and others that offered dances for teenagers and training in martial arts. According to Oakland County Supervisor John George: "Huey could take street-gang types and give them a social consciousness."

In 1982, Newton was accused of embezzling $600,000 of state aid to the Panther-founded Oakland Community School. In the wake of the embezzlement charges, Newton disbanded the Black Panther Party. The embezzlement charges were dropped six years later in March 1989, after Newton pleaded no contest to a single allegation of cashing a $15,000 state check for personal use. He was sentenced to six months in jail and 18 months probation.

=== Fatal shooting of John Frey ===
In 1967, he was involved in a shootout which led to the death of police officer John Frey and injuries to himself and another police officer. In 1968, Newton was convicted of voluntary manslaughter for Frey's death and sentenced to 2 to 15 years in prison. In May 1970, the conviction was reversed and after two subsequent trials ended in hung juries, the charges were dropped.

Newton had been convicted of assault with a deadly weapon for repeatedly stabbing another man, Odell Lee, with a steak knife in mid-1964. He served six months in prison. By October 27–28, 1967, he was out celebrating the release from his probationary period. Going to get take-out food just before dawn on October 28, Newton and a friend were pulled over by Oakland Police Department officer John Frey because the car he was in was listed by the Oakland Police as being associated with the Black Panthers. Realizing who Newton was, Frey called for backup. After fellow officer Herbert Heanes arrived, shots were fired, and all three were wounded.

Heanes testified that the shooting began after Newton was under arrest, and one witness testified that Newton shot Frey with Frey's own gun as they wrestled. No gun on either Frey or Newton was found. Newton stated that Frey shot him first, which made him lose consciousness during the incident. Frey was shot four times and died within the hour, while Heanes was left in serious condition with three bullet wounds. Black Panther David Hilliard took Newton to Oakland's Kaiser Hospital, where he was admitted with a bullet wound to the abdomen. Newton was soon handcuffed to his bed and arrested for Frey's killing. A doctor, Thomas Finch, and nurse, Corrine Leonard, attended to Newton when he arrived at the hospital, and Finch stated that Newton was "agitated" when asking for treatment and that Newton was given a tranquilizer to calm him.

Newton was convicted in September 1968 of voluntary manslaughter for the killing of Frey and was sentenced to 2 to 15 years in prison. In May 1970, the California Appellate Court reversed the conviction and ordered a new trial. After two subsequent trials ended in hung juries, the district attorney said he would not pursue a fourth trial, and the Alameda County Superior Court dismissed the charges. In his autobiography, Revolutionary Suicide, Newton wrote that Heanes and Frey were opposite each other and shooting in each other's direction during the shootout.

External videos
- Booknotes interview with Hugh Pearson on The Shadow of the Panther", August 21, 1994, C-SPAN

Hugh Pearson, in his book Shadow of the Panther, writes that Newton, while intoxicated, boasted about having willfully killed Frey.

=== "Free Huey!" campaign ===
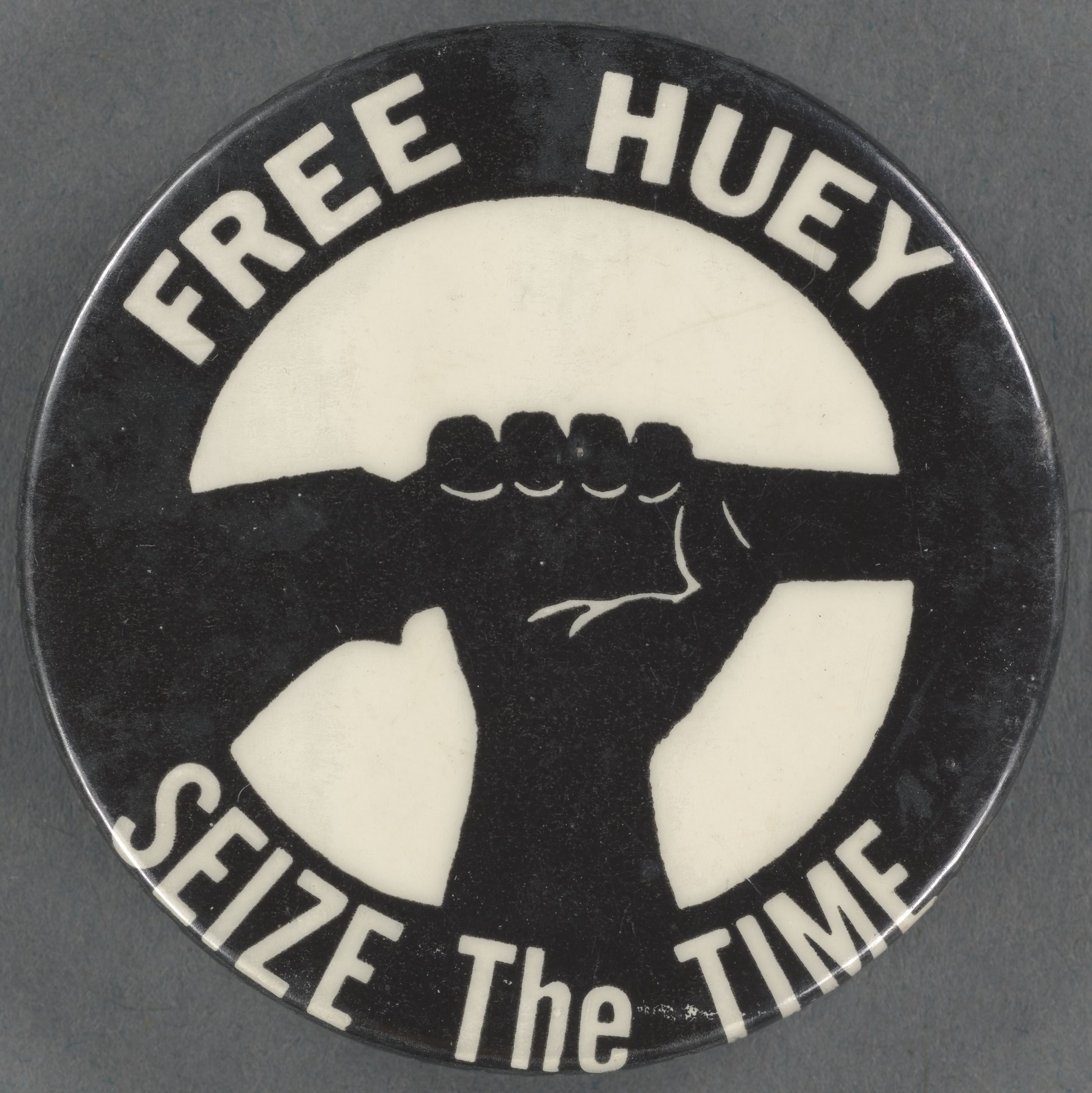
A button supporting the campaign to release Newton.

Newton was arrested on the day of the shooting on October 28, 1967, and pled not guilty to the murder of officer John Frey. The Black Panther Party immediately went to work organizing a coalition to rally behind Newton and champion his release. In December the Peace and Freedom Party, a majority white anti-war political organization, joined with the Black Panther Party in support of Newton. This alliance served the dual purpose of legitimizing Newton's cause while boosting the credibility of the party within the community of more radical activists.

Under the leadership of the Black Panther Party and the Peace and Freedom Party, 5,000 protesters gathered in Oakland on Newton's birthday, February 17, 1968, in support of Newton. They garnered the attention of international news organizations, raising the profile of the party by astounding measures. The phrase "Free Huey!" was adopted as a rallying cry for the movement, and it was printed on buttons and T-shirts. Prominent Black Panther Kathleen Cleaver claimed the goal of the Free Huey! campaign was to elevate Newton as a symbol of everything the Black Panther Party stood for, creating something of a living martyr. The trial, which began on July 15, quickly ascended beyond the scope of Newton himself, evolving into a racially-charged political movement. Over the two-year course of Newton's original trial and two re-trials, the coalition continued to offer its support until the charges were overturned and Newton was released on August 5, 1970.

=== Visit to China ===
In 1970, after his release from prison, Newton received an invitation to visit the People's Republic of China. On learning of President Nixon's plan to visit China in 1972, Newton decided to visit before him. Newton made the trip in late September 1971 with fellow Panthers Elaine Brown and Robert Bay, and stayed for 10 days. At every Chinese airport he landed in, Newton was greeted by thousands of people waving copies of the "Little Red Book" (Quotations from Chairman Mao Tse-tung) and displaying signs that said, "We support the Black Panther Party, down with U.S. imperialism", or, "We support the American people but the Nixon imperialist regime must be overthrown."

During the trip, the Chinese arranged for him to meet and have dinner with an ambassador from North Korea, an ambassador from Tanzania, and delegations from both North Vietnam and the Provisional Revolutionary Government of South Vietnam. Newton was under the impression he was going to meet Mao Zedong, chairman of the Chinese Communist Party, but instead had two meetings with Chinese Premier Zhou Enlai. One of these meetings also included Mao's wife Jiang Qing. Newton described China as "a free and liberated territory with a socialist government".

Following Newton's Asian trip, the Black Panther Party began incorporating North Korea's Juche ideals into the party's ideology.

=== Peoples Temple of the Disciples of Christ ===
In January 1977, Jim Jones, leader of the Peoples Temple of the Disciples of Christ (commonly shortened to the Peoples Temple), visited Newton in Havana, Cuba.

That same year after Jones fled to Jonestown, a commune Jones had established in Guyana for his followers, Newton spoke to Temple members in Jonestown via telephone expressing support for Jones during one of the Temple's earliest "White Nights". Newton's cousin, Stanley Clayton, was one of the few residents of Jonestown to escape the area before the 1978 mass murder of over 900 Temple members by Jones and his enforcers through forced suicide.

=== Violence ===
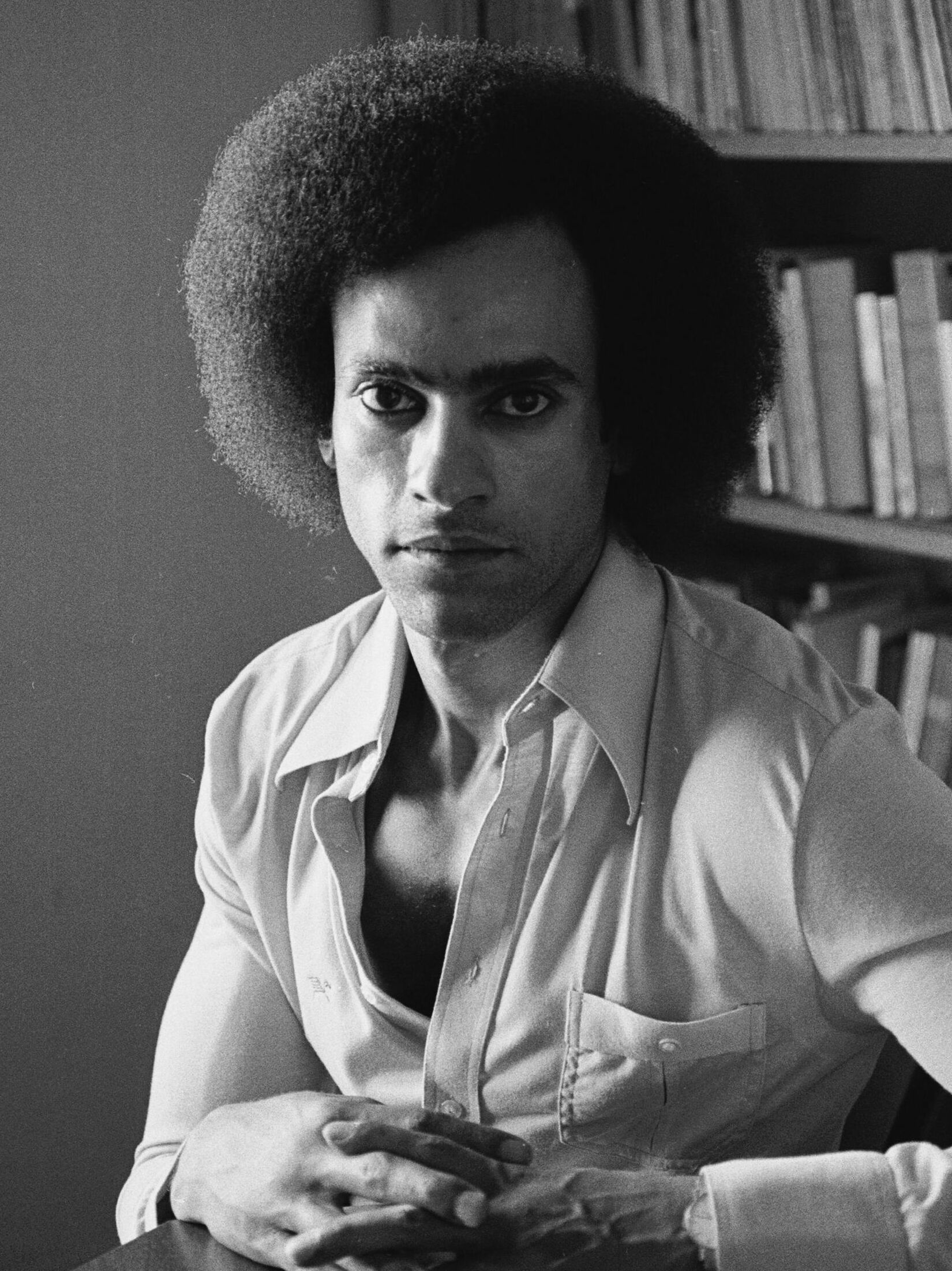
Newton in August 1977

In addition to the altercation with Frey, Newton was personally involved in several acts of violence, and alleged to have been complicit in others.

By the 1970s, Newton had allegedly become increasingly paranoid, addicted to cocaine, and prone to violent behavior.

On August 6, 1974, Kathleen Smith, a 17-year-old Oakland native and prostitute was shot; she died three months later. According to the prosecutor handling the case, Newton is believed to have shot Smith after a casual exchange on the street during which she referred to him as "Baby," a childhood nickname he hated. The main witness of this case refused to testify due to an assassination attempt against her and, after two deadlocked jury trials, Newton was not convicted.

Newton is also alleged to have assaulted his tailor over the price of a suit. Newton posted bond after being arrested for pistol-whipping the tailor in 1974. The incident occurred after a dispute arose regarding the price of a custom-made suit. Newton, known for his status as a prominent figure in the Black Panther Party, reportedly became enraged over the cost and the perceived overcharging. This event is often referenced in discussions of Newton's complex persona, which combined revolutionary ideals with a more flamboyant and sometimes violent personal side.

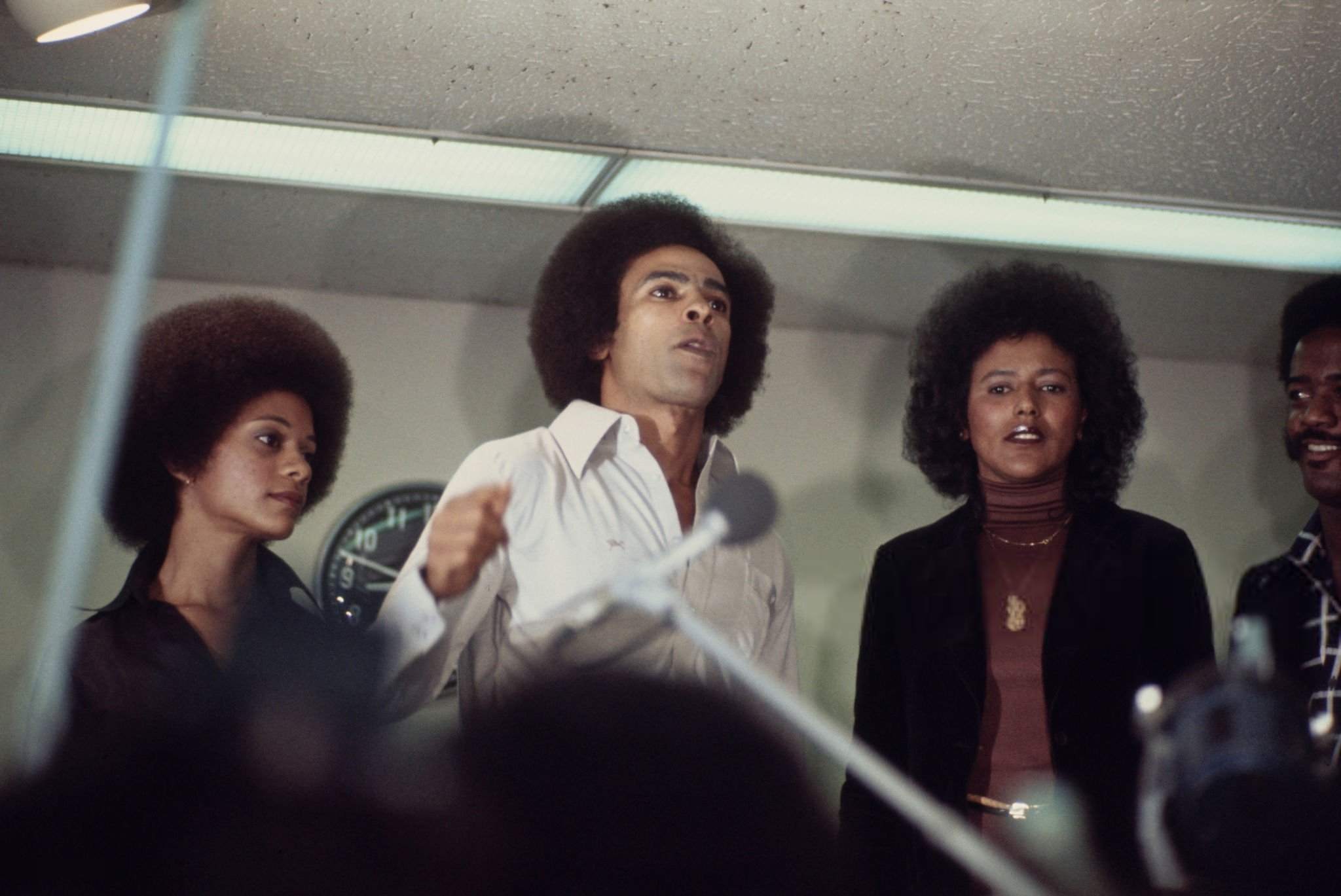
Newton (center) speaks to a crowd of Black Panthers at San Francisco International Airport with his wife Gwen (left) and Elaine Brown, July 5, 1977

Newton was subsequently arrested a second time for the murder of Smith, but was able to post an additional $80,000 bond, thus securing his release until trial. Newton and his girlfriend (later his wife) Gwen Fountaine then fled to Havana, Cuba, where they lived until 1977. In Cuba, Newton claimed political asylum and his absence delayed further prosecution on the two charges. Elaine Brown took over as chairperson of the Black Panther Party in his absence. Newton returned to the United States in 1977 to stand trial for the murder of Smith and the assault on the tailor.

In October 1977, three Black Panthers attempted to assassinate Crystal Gray, a key prosecution witness in Newton's upcoming trial who had been present the day of Kathleen Smith's murder. Unknown to the assailants, they attacked the wrong house and the occupant returned fire. During the shootout one of the Panthers, Louis Johnson, was killed, and the other two assailants escaped. One of the two surviving assassins, Flores Forbes, fled to Las Vegas, Nevada, with the help of Panther paramedic Nelson Malloy. In November 1977, Malloy was found by park rangers paralyzed from the waist down from bullet wounds to the back in a shallow grave in the desert outside of Las Vegas. According to Malloy, he and Forbes were ordered by "higher-ups" to be killed to eliminate any eyewitness accounts of the attempted murder of Crystal Gray. Malloy recovered from the assault and told police that fellow Panthers Rollin Reid and Allen Lewis were behind his attempted murder. Newton denied any involvement or knowledge and said that the events "might have been the result of overzealous party members." After the assassination attempt on Crystal Gray, she declined to testify against Newton. After two trials and two deadlocked juries, the prosecution decided not to retry Newton for Smith's murder. Journalist Ken Kelley, three weeks after Newton's death, claimed that Newton had confessed to him that he murdered Smith and ordered the murder of Betty Van Patter.

During Newton's trial for assaulting the tailor, the tailor, who changed his testimony several times, eventually told the jury that he did not know who assaulted him. In September 1978, Newton was acquitted of the assault but convicted of illegal firearms possession; he eventually served 9 months in prison in 1987.

In 2007, party member Ericka Huggins stated in an interview that Newton repeatedly raped her and threatened that if she told anyone he would hurt her children.

=== Murder ===
In the early hours of August 22, 1989, Newton was murdered in front of 1456 9th Street, near the corner of Center Street in the Prescott neighborhood of Oakland, California. Within days, Tyrone Robinson was arrested as a suspect; he was on parole and admitted the murder to police, claiming self-defense, though police found no evidence that Newton was carrying a gun. In 1991, Robinson was convicted of first-degree murder and sentenced to a prison term of 32 years to life. His next parole hearing is set for November 2028. Robinson stated that his motive was to advance in the Black Guerrilla Family, a narcotics prison gang, in order to get a crack franchise.

Newton's funeral was held at Allen Temple Baptist Church, which he had attended following his conversion. Some 1,300 mourners were accommodated inside, and another 500 to 600 listened to the service from outside. Newton's achievements in civil rights and work on behalf of Black children and families with the Black Panther Party were celebrated. Newton's body was cremated, and a memorial plaque was placed at Evergreen Cemetery in Oakland.

On February 17, 2021, in commemoration of the Black Panther Party the City of Oakland erected a bust of Huey Newton near the street corner where he was murdered. That same year, a commemorative plaque "Dr. Huey P. Newton Way" was applied to this section of 9th Street.

== Writing and scholarship ==
Newton's doctoral dissertation titled War Against the Panthers: A Study of Repression in America "analyzes certain features of the Party and incidents that are significant in its development", among which are how the United States federal government responded to the BPP as well as to the assassinations of Fred Hampton, Bunchy Carter, and John Huggins. Sources for material used to support the dissertation include two federal civil rights lawsuits. One suit was against the FBI and other government officials, while the other was initially against the City of Chicago.

Later, Newton's widow, Fredrika Newton, would discuss her husband's often-ignored academic research during C-SPAN's American Perspectives program on February 18, 2006. After the decline of the Black Panther Party, Huey P. Newton completed and copyrighted dozens of essays on philosophy, political theology, evolutionary biology, and political economy which remain unpublished and held in archive at Stanford University.

=== Works ===
- Huey Newton Speaks – oral history (Paredon Records, 1970)
- Newton, Huey P. (1972), To Die For The People : The Writings Of Huey P. Newton, Random House, ISBN 978-0394480855, Franz Schurmann (Introduction) (Random House, 1972)
- Newton, Huey P.; Herman Blake, J. (2009), Revolutionary Suicide, National Geographic Books, ISBN 978-0143105329, with J. Herman Blake (Random House, 1973; republished in 1995 with introduction by Blake)
- Newton, Huey P.; Huggins, Ericka (1975), Insights and Poems, City Lights, ISBN 978-0872860797, with Ericka Huggins (1975)
- The Crash of Flight 90: Doomed by Self-Deception?, with Robert Trivers (Science Digest, 1982)
- Newton, Huey P. (1996), War Against the Panthers: A Study of Repression in America, Harlem River Press, ISBN 978-0863162466 (Harlem River Press, 1996: the published version of Newton's PhD thesis)
- Newton, Huey P. (2002), The Huey P. Newton Reader, Seven Stories Press, ISBN 978-1583224663, edited by David Hilliard and Donald Weise (Seven Stories Press)
- Essays from the Minister of Defense, Black Panther Party, 1968, Oakland (pamphlet)
- The Genius of Huey P. Newton, Awesome Records (June 1, 1993)
- The original vision of the Black Panther Party, Black Panther Party (1973)
- Huey Newton talks to the movement about the Black Panther Party, cultural nationalism, SNCC, liberals and white revolutionaries (The Movement, 1968)
- Newton, Huey (2009), To Die for the People, City Lights Publishers, ISBN 978-0872865297, edited by Toni Morrison, foreword by Elaine Brown (Random House, 1972; City Lights Publishers, 2009)
- Newton, Huey P. (2019), The New Huey P. Newton Reader, Seven Stories Press, ISBN 978-1609809003, edited by David Hilliard and Donald Weise, introduction by Elaine Brown (Seven Stories Press, 2019)

== In popular culture ==
- In the song "Propaganda" (2000) by Dead Prez, on their album Let's Get Free, Newton is referenced in the lyrics "31 years ago I would've been a Panther. They killed Huey cause they knew he had the answer. The views that you see in the news is propaganda." As well as in the outro of the song, which samples an interview with Newton:

[Outro: Huey P. Newton] Uh, we view each other with a great love and a great understanding. And that we try to expand this to the general black population, and also, people oppressed people all over the world. And, I think that we differ from some other groups simply because we understand the system better than most groups understand the system. And with this realization, we attempt to form a strong political base based in the community with the only strength that we have and that's the strength of a potentially destructive force if we don't get freedom.

- The song "Up in Arms" (2015) by American songwriter Bhi Bhiman is based on Newton's life.
- Agnès Varda's 1968 documentary on the Black Panthers features extensive interviews with Newton during his incarceration.
- The Boondocks comic strip by Aaron McGruder, and related TV cartoon, features a main character known as Huey Freeman, a 10-year-old African-American revolutionary, who was named after Newton; Freeman starts an independent newspaper, dubbing it the Free Huey World Report.
- In 2012, French LFKs collective presented a contemporary opera referring to Huey P. Newton, directed by Jean Michel Bruyère at the Festival international d'art lyrique d'Aix-en-Provence. Une situation HUEY P. NEWTON was the second chapter of vitaNONnova, a series of stage and film productions around the Black Panther Party and its founders.
- The fourth track on St. Vincent's 2014 St. Vincent album is named after Newton.
- The song "Free Huey" by the Boo Radleys, from their Kingsize album (1998) is about the activities of the Black Panther Party when Newton was an activist.
- The song "Welcome to the Terrordome" by Public Enemy contained the lines:

"Every brother ain't a brother

'Cause a black hand squeezed on Malcolm X the man
The shooting of Huey Newton

From a hand of a Nig who pulled the trig"

- The song "Police State" by Dead Prez references Newton with the line "I'll take a slug for the 'cause like Huey P."
- The song "Changes" by Tupac Shakur references Newton, stating "It's time to fight back that's what Huey said, two shots in the dark now Huey's dead."
- In the television mini-series The Big Cigar, Huey Newton is portrayed by André Holland.
- Newton attended, and is referenced by Pryor directly, Richard Pryor's Live in Concert.
- In the song "Blood of the Fang" by the band Clipping, multiple revolutionaries are mentioned by pseudonyms. Huey P. Newton is quoted multiple times and named as "King Huey"
- Green Day's Dookie album cover features graffiti with the phrase "Free Huey"

== See also ==
- Black Panther Party
- Eldridge Cleaver
- COINTELPRO
- Angela Davis
- George Jackson
- New Left
- Soledad Brothers
- White Panther Party
- Young Lords
- The Black Panthers: Vanguard of the Revolution
