= Ojore Lutalo =

Ojore Nuru Lutalo (born c. 1946) is an American artist who participated in militant actions on behalf of the New World of Islam and the Black Liberation Army (BLA). After committing a bank robbery, he was arrested and jailed in 1981. He was moved to a Management Control Unit (MCU) in Trenton State Prison (now New Jersey State Prison) in 1986, without being told why and was held in solitary confinement. The American Friends Service Committee took an interest in his case. He was released from the MCU in 2002 and released from prison in 2009. Whilst incarcerated, Lutalo began to make collages out of newspapers and magazines as a way to show the conditions under which he was being held; after his release, he has exhibited his artworks at MoMA PS1 and Yale Institute of Sacred Music.

== Early life ==
Ojore Nuru Lutalo was born c. 1946 in New Jersey in the United States. He had three brothers and six sisters. He lived in Asbury Park, Neptune and Long Branch, all in New Jersey. Also known by the name Leroy Bunting, Lutalo became involved with the New World of Islam, a militant Black Muslim group which carried out bank robberies and murdered drug dealers as part of a plan for Black separatism.

== Prison ==
In November 1975 he was arrested with Kojo Bomani Sababu (also known as Grailing Brown) after a police chase on the Memorial parkway in New Brunswick, New Jersey. The following month, Lutalo was again arrested after a bank robbery in Trenton of the Broad Street National Bank. This was an action for the Black Liberation Army which ended in a shootout with the police. He was then arrested again after a gunfight with a drug dealer in 1981 and was sentenced to a prison term of 22 to 48 years. By 1975, Lutalo was disenchanted with Marxism and after conversations with Kuwasi Balagoon became an anarchist. He henceforth called himself a "New Afrikan/Anarchist Prisoner of War" and was part of a loose grouping of Black Anarchists which included JoNina Abron-Ervin, Ashanti Alston, Lorenzo Kom'boa Ervin and Martin Sostre.

Lutalo was moved to a Management Control Unit (MCU) in Trenton State Prison (now New Jersey State Prison) in 1986, without being told why and was held in solitary confinement. He wrote to the American Friends Service Committee asking them to help find out why he had been moved and made contact with Bonnie Kerness, a prisoner rights activist who started to campaign on his behalf. Kerness founded the Control Unit Monitoring Project and worked to improve conditions for the 60 African Americans being held in solitary confinement at Trenton, for example stopping the practice of 1 am strip searches. Lutalo later found out that he had been put into the MCU because of his political views; when the number of people placed into MCUs increased, Kerness and others set up the National Campaign to Stop Control Unit Prisons.

== Release ==
Whilst incarcerated, Lutalo began to make collages out of newspapers and magazines as a way to show the conditions under which he was being held. He passed them on to Kerness, who would then photocopy them for distribution and also used them to illustrate her talks on prisoner rights. The prison authorities stated that solitary confinement was not punishment since Lutalo had not committed any infractions. He was taken out from the MCU in 2002 and received compensation for being held in it for 16 years; he was later returned to the MCU by order of the Department of Homeland Security. He was released in August 2009 after serving a total of 28 years in prison.

In 2010, Lutalo was arrested at La Junta station in La Junta, Colorado and charged with the felony of endangering public transportation. He had been returning to New Jersey from an anarchist bookfair in Los Angeles, when a fellow passenger alleged they heard him talking about bombing an Amtrak train and Al Qaeda. Lutalo was held for three days in custody and released on bail before the charges were dropped. He sued La Junta Police Department on the grounds that the police chief had lied on the arrest warrant and had falsely claimed he was Nigerian, and the following year was awarded unspecified damages. After his release from prison, Lutalo has exhibited his artworks at places such as MoMA PS1 and Yale Institute of Sacred Music. He also volunteers with the American Friends Service Committee.
