= San Francisco 8 =

2007 arrests of former Black Panthers

- Leaders: Herman Bell, Jalil Muntaqim, Richard Brown, Richard O'Neal, Ray Boudreaux, Hank Jones, Francisco Torres, Harold Taylor
- Active regions: San Francisco, California, United States
- Size: 8
- Part of: Black Panther Party

In January 2007 eight former Black Panthers were arrested for their alleged involvement in the 1971 murder of Sgt. John V. Young at Ingleside Police station in San Francisco.

Herman Bell and Jalil Muntaqim were already incarcerated. Richard Brown, Richard O'Neal, Ray Boudreaux, and Hank Jones were arrested in California; Francisco Torres was arrested in Queens, New York; and Harold Taylor was arrested in Florida. Authorities alleged that seven of the men were members of the Black Liberation Army. Bail amounts were originally set between three and five million dollars each. Torres' fingerprints were alleged to have been found on a lighter at the scene of the crime.The prosecution failed to produce this evidence in court.

In January 2008, charges of conspiracy were dropped against five of the defendants, and Richard O'Neal was removed from the case altogether. On June 29, 2009, Bell pleaded guilty to voluntary manslaughter in the death of Sgt. Young. The following month, charges against Boudreaux, Brown, Jones, and Taylor were dropped. After spending over a year in the San Francisco jail at 850 Bryant, Muntaqim pleaded no contest to conspiracy to commit voluntary manslaughter. Torres, a Vietnam War veteran, had charges against him dismissed as well.

== Sources ==
- The Story of the San Francisco 8 LA Progressive website
