= George Wright (fugitive) =

Portuguese citizen of American origin (born 1943)

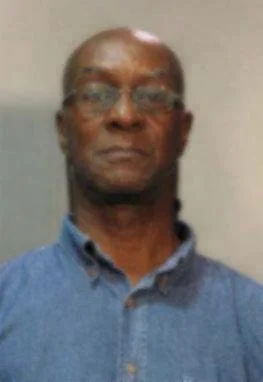
- Wright in 2011
- Born: March 29, 1943 (age 83); Halifax, Virginia
- Other names: José Luís Jorge dos Santos; Larry Burgess; Larry Darnell Burgess; Reverend L. Burgess; Jack Ragland
- Citizenship: United States; Portugal
- Height: 5 ft 11 in (180 cm) – 6 ft
- Status: Convicted
- Motive: Robbery
- Convictions: Unlawful Flight to Avoid Prosecution; Murder; Air piracy; Aiding and abetting
- Criminal charges: Murder, hijacking, kidnapping
- Penalty: 15–30 years (for original murder charge)
- Capture status: Fugitive since 1970 after escape from New Jersey prison; Fugitive since 2011 after arrest in Portugal
- Wanted by: New Jersey Department of Corrections
- Accomplices: Asbury Park murder: Walter McGhee; Elizabeth Roswell; Julio DeLeon; Hijacking: George Brown; Joyce Brown; Melvin McNair; Jean Carol Allen McNair
- Wanted since: August 26, 1970
- Time at large: 48 years
- Escaped: August 22, 1970

Details
- Victims: Walter Patterson
- Date: November 23, 1962
- Country: United States
- State: New Jersey
- Location: Asbury Park, New Jersey
- Killed: 1
- Weapon: Sawed-off .22-caliber rifle
- Date apprehended: December 13, 1962
- Imprisoned at: Leesburg State Prison

George Edward Wright (born March 29, 1943) is a Portuguese citizen of American origin, known for taking part in the hijacking of Delta Air Lines Flight 841. Originally arrested and convicted for murder in 1962 and sentenced to up to 30 years in prison, George Wright escaped from prison in 1970 and hijacked a Delta Air Lines flight in 1972 with a number of accomplices.

On September 26, 2011, Wright was arrested in Portugal. The United States Department of Justice requested his extradition from Portugal to the United States, but the request was denied on the grounds that Wright is a Portuguese citizen. He was released in October 2011 and continued to live in Portugal.

== Early life ==
Wright was born in Halifax, Virginia, on March 29, 1943. In 1961, he graduated from Mary Bethune High School.

== New Jersey offenses ==
=== Murder conviction ===
On Friday, November 23, 1962, the day after Thanksgiving, George Wright, then 19 and from East Orange, New Jersey, and three accomplices: Walter McGhee, Elizabeth Roswell and Julio DeLeon of Asbury Park; were involved in the commission of multiple armed robberies.

The four suspects first robbed the Sands Motel in Englishtown of $200. They then made their way to the Collingswood Esso filling station on eastbound Route 33 in Wall Township. At around 9:25 pm, during the second robbery, McGhee fatally wounded Walter Patterson, a 42-year-old World War II veteran and Bronze Star recipient who lived in Howell. Patterson was a father of two teenage daughters. Patterson, who earlier that evening had relieved his brother Harry C. Patterson Jr. and sent him home to have dinner with his family, was taken to Fitkin Memorial Hospital in Neptune Township, where he died from the gunshot wound two days later.

Wright, armed with a sawn-off .22-calibre rifle, and McGhee, armed with a .32-caliber pistol, were both wearing women's pantyhose over their faces when they assaulted Patterson. McGhee fired two shots during the robbery. Patterson was shot once in the abdomen before the four got away with $70 in cash. Police later determined it was a shot from McGhee's pistol that led to Patterson's death.

The four were arrested two days later. On December 13, 1962, Wright was indicted on state charges along with his associates. McGhee, as the triggerman, was charged with Patterson's murder and sentenced to a life prison term in February 1963, but was paroled in August 1977. Wright, as one of the holdup men, was also charged with murder.

On February 15, 1963, Wright reportedly changed his plea from innocent to no contest to the charge of murder, in order to avoid a jury trial that could have resulted in the death penalty. Wright was subsequently sentenced to 15 to 30 years in prison.

=== Escape from prison ===
On August 19, 1970, between 10 and 11 p.m., after serving over 7 years and 6 months of his sentence, Wright joined three inmates and "just walked out" between bed checks from a state prison farm at Leesburg State Prison, now known as the Bayside State Prison in Leesburg, New Jersey. Wright escaped with his future hijacking accomplice, George Brown, who was serving a three to five-year sentence for a 1968 armed robbery conviction. They allegedly stole the prison warden's car to get away. They made their way to Detroit, where they became affiliated with the Black Liberation Army.

On August 26, 1970, federal complaints were issued in Atlantic City, charging Brown and Wright with unlawful flight to avoid confinement.

== Federal offenses ==
=== Hijacking and extortion ===
On July 31, 1972, Wright, then 29, together with:

- George Brown, then 28, of Elizabeth, New Jersey, (alias Harry Singleton) with whom Wright escaped from prison
- Joyce Brown (aka Tillerson), then 31, of Spartanburg, South Carolina, accompanied by her 2-year-old daughter
- Melvin McNair, then 23, born in Greensboro, North Carolina
- Jean Carol Allen McNair, then 25, from Winston-Salem, North Carolina, accompanied by her 1-year-old daughter and 2-year-old son

boarded Delta Air Lines Flight 841 in Detroit. The DC-8 flight was bound for Miami.

Wright was dressed allegedly as a priest and, using the alias the Rev. Larry Darnell Burgess, he smuggled a handgun aboard the flight in a hollowed-out Bible. One passenger described the apparent ringleader as a black man, about 30, wearing a black mohair suit which others described as a clerical outfit. The pilot of the hijacked Detroit-Miami flight, Captain William Harold May, then 41, and a 20-year Delta employee, said Wright was the group's leader.

The hijackers, allegedly members of the Black Liberation Army, seized the plane as it approached Miami, where they demanded that FBI agents (dressed only in bathing suits) deliver $1 million ransom to the plane; the FBI complied. The hijackers allowed the 86 hostage passengers to leave the plane in Miami, but kept the flight crew. They then ordered the plane to fly to Boston, where they refueled and took on an international navigator. They then directed the plane to Algiers, where they sought political asylum since the Algerian government had shown compassion towards revolutionaries.

May told reporters that two of the hijackers smoked marijuana continuously during the flight, and commented, "They said they were revolutionaries, that America is a decadent society and they didn't want to live here anymore." Upon arrival in Algeria, Melvin McNair had parting words for his pilot: "We're famous", he said, "Send us a copy of your paper."

On Wednesday, August 2, 1972, federal complaints of air piracy charges were filed in Miami, naming the five accomplices as defendants.

==== Asylum in Algeria ====
Wright and his associates were briefly taken into custody but were released after a few days. Reportedly, Wright and his group were taken in by the American writer and prominent Black Panther Eldridge Cleaver, whom Algeria's sympathetic socialist government allowed to open an office. Cleaver wrote an open letter to the then Algerian president, Houari Boumediene, in part:

In humbleness and all sincerity, I think it would be consistent with the Algerian tradition of struggle and revolution to continue welcoming American revolutionaries ... whether they come to your shores or your airfields, penniless or with millions of dollars. ... To carry out our struggle for the liberation of our people, we must have money. Without the money to finance and organize the struggle, there will be no freedom.

This hijacking represented the final test of the Third World nation's commitment to supporting some contingents of the African American freedom movement. At the request of the U.S. government, the Algerian government confiscated and returned the $1 million in ransom money to the U.S. After the hijackers' calls to have the ransom money restored to them were ignored by the Algerian government, Wright and his associates disappeared. Allegedly, in early 1973, the group traveled by ship to France and lived and worked there with new identities.

==== Apprehension and refused extradition of accomplices ====
On May 26, 1976, Wright's four associates were located in Paris and arrested by the National Police for carrying false U.S. passports. Facing extradition to the United States, the four issued an appeal to the French people on October 11, 1976, claiming that while they were "ready to face the consequences of our act", they could not expect a fair trial in America and "would be condemned to spend the rest of our days in infernal prisons". French authorities declined the American extradition request in November 1976, holding the four defendants in Fleury-Mérogis Prison, awaiting trial on hijacking charges. On November 24, 1978, the four were convicted by a French court for the hijacking. All received five-year sentences, but two years were suspended from the women's terms. In the United States, they would have faced a minimum of 20 years. The jury had found them guilty but noted "extenuating circumstances". George Brown and Melvin McNair were released in 1981.

In 2012, a documentary titled Melvin & Jean: An American Story was made by director Maia Wechsler. Melvin McNair and his wife, Jean, work at an orphanage in Caen, where reportedly they have turned their lives around completely. McNair also coaches youth in baseball.

In 2010, a documentary titled Nobody Knows My Name was made about the hijacking. According to Mikhael Ganouna, producer of the film, Wright's hijacking accomplice, George Brown, lives in Paris, but isn't worried about being extradited because he has already served his sentence.

==== Extradition in a similar preluding hijacking ====
The Flight 841 hijacking was a copycat of a similar incident two months earlier, involving the hijacking of Western Airlines Flight 701 from Los Angeles to Seattle on June 3, 1972, by Willie Roger Holder, a black Vietnam veteran, and Catherine Marie Kerkow, his white girlfriend. The hijackers claimed they had a bomb in an attaché case and demanded $500,000. After allowing all 97 passengers to get off in San Francisco, they flew to Algeria where they were granted political asylum. The Algerian government confiscated and returned $488,000 of the ransom money to US officials. On January 25, 1975, the two hijackers, carrying passports under the names Leavy Forte and Janice Ann Forte, were arrested on illegal entry charges by French police. On April 15, 1975, a French court refused a US extradition request for the pair on grounds the hijacking was a political act. In July 1986, French authorities moved to deport Holder to the US after he completed his sentence for 1984 assault charges. Kerkow went missing, was never extradited, and her whereabouts and status remain unknown.

== Life after hijacking ==
After the apprehension of his four accomplices, Wright remained the lone hijacker at large. Wright is known to have made his way to France, Guinea-Bissau, and finally to Portugal. While living in Guinea-Bissau in the 1980s, Wright allegedly used his real name and worked as logistics manager of the Belgian nonprofit Iles de Paix.

=== Apprehension ===
On September 26, 2011, Wright was arrested in Algueirão–Mem Martins, Portugal after 41 years on the run, as the result of a United States Marshals Service Fugitive Task Force (Detectives Richard Cope and Daniel Klotz) and the New Jersey Department of Corrections Special Investigations Division that introduced cold-case evidence from New Jersey. After locating Wright, the task force confirmed Wright's fingerprints from the New Jersey arrest with the fingerprints on the ID card issued by the Portuguese government. Wright spent nearly three weeks in jail, before being released under house arrest. The United States sought his extradition, with the possibility that he would finish the remaining 22 years of his sentence. However, the request was denied on the grounds that Wright is a Portuguese citizen.

=== Life in Portugal ===
Wright, who lived under the name of José Luís Jorge dos Santos, had no known occupation, but allegedly at one point owned a barbecue chicken restaurant, sold items at a stall along a popular tourist beach, worked as a bouncer at a local bar, and, similarly to Melvin McNair, coached youth in basketball. He married a Portuguese-English translator who was 13 years younger and, together, the couple had two children. His neighbors knew his first name was George, but did not know his history, assuming he was African, not American.

== See also ==
- Aircraft hijacking
- List of aircraft hijackings
