= JoNina Abron-Ervin =

American journalist, activist, and Black anarchist

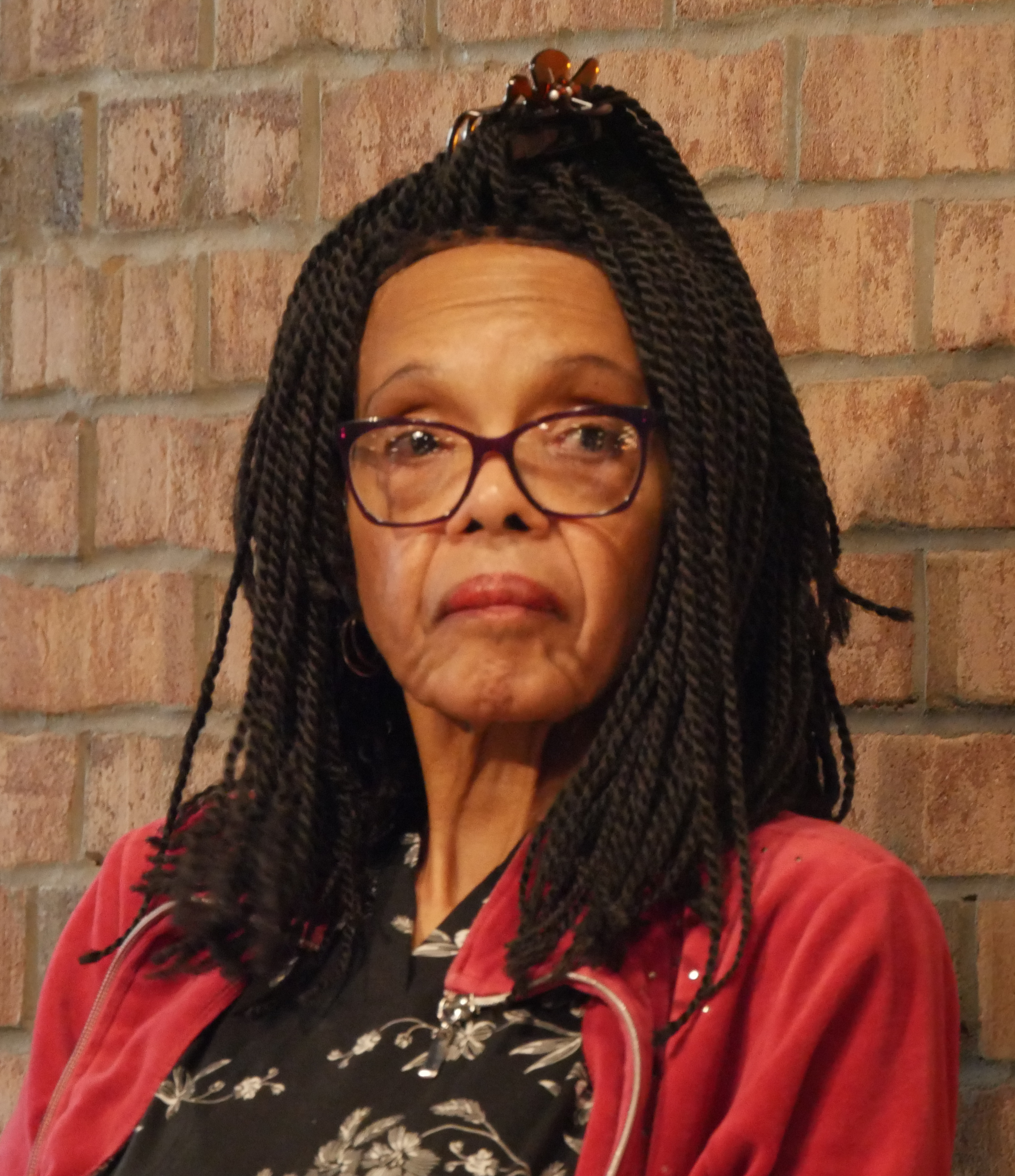
- Born: 1948 (age 77–78); Jefferson City, Missouri, United States
- Education: Baker University (BA); Purdue University (MA)
- Occupations: Journalist, professor
- Political party: Black Panther Party (1972–1982)
- Spouse: Lorenzo Kom'boa Ervin

JoNina Marie Abron-Ervin (born 1948) is an American journalist and activist. She became involved with the black power movement following the assassination of Martin Luther King Jr. and a trip she took to Rhodesia. While at university, she reported for several newspapers, including The Cincinnati Herald and The Chicago Defender. After graduating, she joined the Black Panther Party and was active in organising a number of its survival programs, as well as serving as the last editor of the party newspaper, The Black Panther until the party's dissolution. She was also managing editor of the academic journal The Black Scholar, and worked as a professor at Western Michigan University. Since her retirement, she has remained active in community organizing and anti-racist activism, and is affiliated with Black anarchism.

== Biography ==
Born in Jefferson City, Missouri, Abron was the daughter of a minister in the United Methodist Church. She was educated at Baker University in Baldwin City, Kansas, where she reported she had received a discounted rate "for being a preacher's kid". By the time she enrolled in university in the late 1960s, the United States was experiencing a broad countercultural movement, with the rise of the black power movement and the opposition to United States involvement in the Vietnam War. Abron reported her own feeling of radicalization following the assassination of Martin Luther King Jr.

In 1968, Abron travelled to Rhodesia, along with other students and teachers from Baker. There she worked at a black-owned newspaper, which was subjected to strict censorship by the white-minority government. She described this as a "transforming experience" that developed her understanding of journalism. Upon her return to Kansas, she became editor of the Baker Orange, graduating with a degree in journalism in 1970. She then went to work at The Cincinnati Herald and subsequently moved to Chicago, where she worked as a reporter for The Chicago Defender and in public relations at Malcolm X College.

In 1972, Abron earned a master's degree in communication at Purdue University. That same year, she joined the Detroit chapter of the Black Panther Party, going on to work at the party headquarters in Oakland, California, where she became the last editor of the party's newspaper, The Black Panther. She played an active role in the development of the BPP's "survival programs," which included provisions for Free Breakfast for Children, free buses for prison visitors and a free education program. She was active within the party up until its dissolution; although she would later say that she was "still a Panther. I'll die one." From 1974 to 1990, she also edited the academic journal The Black Scholar, after which she worked as a professor of journalism at Western Michigan University.

Abron retired from teaching in 2003, but continued to write books and be involved in anti-racist activism. Together with her husband, the anarchist writer and activist Lorenzo Kom'boa Ervin, she moved to Nashville, Tennessee, where they engaged in community organizing in their neighborhood near Fisk University. In the wake of the Ferguson unrest in 2014, Abron and Ervin moved to Kansas City, Missouri, where they established the Ida B. Wells Coalition Against Racism and Police Brutality, named after journalist and civil rights activist Ida B. Wells. Although Abron did not participate in the George Floyd protests in 2020 due to her age and the risk of the COVID-19 pandemic, she provided advice for younger activists involved in the protest movement. Between 2021 and 2023, Abron and Ervin, released thirteen episodes of the Black Autonomy Podcast, on the topic of Black anarchism.

== Selected works ==
Journal articles

- Abron, JoNina M. (1986). "The Legacy of the Black Panther Party". The Black Scholar. 17 (6): 33–37. doi:10.1080/00064246.1986.11414441. ISSN 0006-4246. JSTOR 41067327. OCLC 9973797586.
- ———————— (1990). "The Image of African Americans in the U.S. Press. "The Truth behind the Facts."". The Black Scholar. 21 (2): 49–52. doi:10.1080/00064246.1990.11412966. ISSN 0006-4246. JSTOR 41067683. OCLC 425545264.
- ———————— (1997). "Reflections of a Former Oakland Public School Parent". The Black Scholar. 27 (2): 15–20. doi:10.1080/00064246.1997.11430854. ISSN 0006-4246. OCLC 424857785.

Chapters

- ————————; Rucker, Madalynn (1996). "'Comrade Sisters': Two Women of the Black Panther Party". In Etter-Lewis, Gwendolyn; Foster, Michele (eds.). Unrelated Kin: Race and Gender in Women's Personal Narratives. New York: Routledge. pp. 139–168. ISBN 9780415911382. OCLC 32272331.
- ———————— (2005). "'Serving the people': The survival programs of the Black Panther Party". In Jones, Charles E. (ed.). The Black Panther Party Reconsidered. Baltimore: Black Classic Press. pp. 176–192. ISBN 9780933121973. OCLC 62792437.

Books

- ———————— (1995). Beyond Political Correctness. Western Michigan University. OCLC 33473274.
- ———————— (2011). Driven by the Movement: Activists of the Black Power Era. Western Michigan University. ISBN 9780578090511. OCLC 811060504.

== Bibliography ==
- Bloom, Joshua; Martin, Waldo E. (2016) [2013]. "Breakfast". Black Against Empire: The History and Politics of the Black Panther Party. University of California Press. pp. 179–198. ISBN 978-0-520-29328-1. JSTOR 10.1525/j.ctv1xxsj1. LCCN 2012021279.
- Heynan, Nick; Rhodes, Jason (2012). "Organizing for Survival: From the Civil Rights Movement to Black Anarchism through the Life of Lorenzo Kom'boa Ervin". ACME: An International Journal for Critical Geographies. 11 (3): 393–412. ISSN 1492-9732.
- Kom'boa Ervin, Lorenzo; Abron, JoNina (May 2000). "Black autonomy: civil rights, the Panthers and today". Do or Die!. No. 9. ISSN 1462-5989 – via Libcom.org.
- Myers, Jenalea (November 12, 2020). "Longtime civil rights activist and journalist continues to fight for social justice". Baker University.
- Phillips, Mary (2015). "The Power of the First-Person Narrative: Ericka Huggins and the Black Panther Party". Women's Studies Quarterly. 43 (3/4): 33–51. doi:10.1353/wsq.2015.0060. JSTOR 43958548. S2CID 86025439.
- Spencer, Robyn C. (2016). ""I Am We": The Demise of the Black Panther Party, 1977-1982". The Revolution Has Come: Black Power, Gender, and the Black Panther Party in Oakland. Duke University Press. pp. 177–201. doi:10.2307/j.ctv11cw9mt.11. ISBN 9780822362753. JSTOR j.ctv11cw9mt.11. LCCN 2016023568.
