= Black Liberation Army =

American underground, black nationalist militant organization

- Logo of the Black Liberation Army
- Leaders: Assata Shakur; Eldridge Cleaver; Twymon Myers
- Dates active: 1970–1981
- Split from: Black Panther Party
- Country: United States
- Active regions: San Francisco Bay Area, New York City, Philadelphia
- Ideology: Marxism–Leninism; Black nationalism Anti-capitalism; Anti-imperialism; Anti-racism; Gender equality
- Political position: Far-left
- Status: Inactive
- Part of: Black power movement, New Left

The Black Liberation Army (BLA) was an underground Marxist–Leninist, black nationalist militant organization that operated in the United States from 1970 to 1981. It was most active in the early 1970s. Composed of former Black Panther Party (BPP) and Republic of New Afrika (RNA) members who engaged in legal activism before going underground, the organization's program was one of war against the United States government, and its stated goal was to "take up arms for the liberation and self-determination of black people in the United States." The BLA carried out bombings, killings of police officers, robberies (which participants termed "expropriations"), and prison breaks.

== Background ==
The eventual emergence of the Black Liberation Army was made possible by several clandestine organizations and an 'underground' armed wing of the Black Panther Party, dispersed throughout the United States, which prioritized armed self-defense and struggle against the police and white vigilantism.

One such organization was the Revolutionary Action Movement (RAM), founded in 1962 in close association with self-defense advocates like Queen Mother Moore and Robert F. Williams, but also communist intellectuals like James and Grace Lee Boggs. In 1964 Robert Williams published a study of the possibilities of guerrilla warfare in the United States in RAM's paper The Crusader, which helped popularize clandestine armed tactics in RAM and adjacent circles. It was the first step in a transition from armed self-defense to armed struggle against a political enemy.

The new concept is to huddle as close to the enemy as possible so as to neutralize his modern and fierce weapons. The new concept creates conditions that involve the total community, whether they want to be involved or not. It sustains a state of confusion and destruction of property. It dislocates the organs of harmony and order and reduces central power to the level of a helpless, sprawling, octopus. During the hours of day sporadic rioting takes place and massive sniping. Night brings all out warfare, organized fighting and unlimited terror against the oppressor and his forces.

A later article on the same topic specified some of the tactics that black armed groups would have to use in the United States:

Armed defense guards would have to be formed throughout the land. These groups would be organized within the confines of the law and when possible become sporting rifle clubs affiliated with the National Rifle Association. They would function only as defense units to safeguard life, limb and property in the ghetto communities. Some form of central direction would be necessary. A tightly organized and well disciplined underground guerilla force would also have to be formed to perform a more aggressive mission.

In New York City, RAM cadre were the armed security for Malcolm X after his split from the Nation of Islam. In 1966, members of RAM would guide the nascent New York branch of the Black Panther Party through political education and established its armed wing, then called the Black Guards. These RAM cadre would influence the East coast BPP's more militant tactical outlook when compared with the Oakland headquarters.

The Black Panther Party on the West coast "differed with RAM's clandestine posture" but nonetheless "organized an underground from its earliest days." This underground armed wing was decentralized, formed out of cells communicating on a need-to-know basis, all "part of a movement concept called the Black Liberation Army." Its membership was broader than the BPP's, and incorporated gangs whose leadership had been folded into the Party. Bunchy Carter, as the BPP's Southern California Minister of Defense, incorporated some of the Slausons, a gang which he had formerly led, to build a clandestine armed wing for the Party. After Carter was assassinated in a FBI-orchestrated feud with the US Organization in 1969, Geronimo Pratt assumed leadership of the BPP's underground armed wing. In this capacity he organized underground formations throughout the United States, especially in the South.

Huey Newton's release from prison in 1970 would destabilize the fragile peace between the West and East coast Black Panther Party, and would reverse course on clandestine militancy in the South which Pratt had initiated during Newton's imprisonment. FBI counterintelligence operations were designed to inflame existing tensions and prevent cooperation between disparate representatives of the black liberation movement. A combination of this meddling and the influence of BPP members convinced Newton to expel Geronimo Pratt from the Party, denounce the BPP membership involved in arming and training Southern cadre, and eventually expel the entire New York chapter of the Black Panther Party from the organization. This expulsion took shape on tactical lines: Newton was uncomfortable with a national network of clandestine armed units answerable to Pratt but not to him, and was concerned that the armed wing was outpacing the Party's above-ground initiatives.

Simultaneous with the establishment and breakdown of the Black Panther Party was the rise and plateau of the Provisional Government of the Republic of New Afrika, which envisioned the establishment of a sovereign state in the Black belt. This took on a project proposed by Malcolm X and Betty Shabazz, and involved many of RAM's early supporters, including Queen Mother Moore and Robert F. Williams, along with former SNCC chairman H. Rap Brown. Veterans of the BPP, PG-RNA, RAM itself, and other local organizations would populate the BLA.

== Formation and development ==
Because it was not an official organization, was not centrally coordinated, and consisted of multiple groups with different timelines, it is difficult to note exactly when and where the BLA emerged out of the pre-existing underground. In some cities, the Black Liberation Army was not connected to or aware of other more coordinated groups of cells, as was the case in Philadelphia, where the BLA formed out of shared members of the Black Unity Council and the city's chapter of the Black Panther Party. During its early years, as member Assata Shakur notes, it "was not a centralized, organized group with a common leadership and chain of command. Instead, there were various organizations and collectives working together and simultaneously independent of each other." At least by 1970, due to police and FBI sabotage, infiltration, internal disunity, mass imprisonment of members, lengthy prison sentences, and the assassination of key members including Fred Hampton, the party's membership was shrinking and its leadership was responding by closing ranks. Many former Panthers defected to the BLA after Eldridge Cleaver's expulsion from the Party during this period. Others simply emphasized clandestinity and armed struggle in response to police repression and assassinations. The New York chapter of the BLA was committed to "defend Black people, to fight for Black people, and to organize Black people militarily, so they can defend themselves through a people's army and people's war."

The BLA was initially decentralized and autonomous, split geographically and without pretense to ideological unity beyond endorsement of black liberation and typically revolutionary socialism. In the mid-1970s, however, a "Call to Consolidate" titled "Message to the Black Movement" was issued by a grouping called the Black Liberation Army - Coordinating Committee (BLA-CC) in an effort to form a more unified movement. This communiqué outlined the majority group's political stance, rejecting reformism as "based on unprincipled class collaboration with our enemy" and asserting the following principles:

1. That we are anti-capitalist, anti-imperialist, anti-racist, and anti-sexist.
2. That we must of necessity strive for the abolishment of these systems and for the institution of socialistic relationships in which Black people have total and absolute control over their own destiny as a people.
3. That in order to abolish our systems of oppression, we must utilize the science of class struggle, develop this science as it relates to our unique national condition.

In this 1976 statement, the BLA-CC allowed "principled" and "tactical" unity with revolutionary Whites; this would guarantee that the revolutionary Black organization made determining decisions both strategically and tactically during the collaboration and guarded against whites using the BLA for their own benefit.

A substantial number of New York Black Liberation Army members did not accept this consolidation effort, and continued to release communiques under the auspices of the BLA in general. By the 1980s, this minority grouping had formed the Revolutionary Armed Task Force, a fusion of veterans of the BLA on one hand and the Weather Underground Organization on the other. The latter were operating as the May 19th Communist Organization, a cell responsible for a series of bombings and robberies. It sought to re-energize the armed struggle in the United States and fund a retrenchment of Black nationalist revolutionary politics that had been eclipsed by the defeat of the movement in the mid-seventies. The alliance between the White anti-imperialist underground and the Black revolutionary nationalist underground caused a great deal of controversy among other groupings in the BLA and PG-RNA, amid accusations that members of the RATF were trafficking drugs and running prostitution rings, Kathy Boudin's guilty plea and dissociation from the movement in exchange for a more lenient sentence, and unsubstantiated accusations that the RATF had been a counterinsurgent 'pseudo-gang' directed by US intelligence.

== Size ==
A 1973 NYPD intelligence report concluded that the BLA had 25 to 30 members and another 75 sympathizers and supporters. Rosenau writes, "A tally of individuals named in press reports, personal accounts, BLA publications, court documents, and declassified FBI records confirm that this estimate was essentially accurate."

== Activities ==
=== 1970–72: Attacks ===
According to a Justice Department report on BLA activity, the Black Liberation Army was suspected of involvement in over 70 incidents of violence between 1970 and 1976. The Fraternal Order of Police blamed the BLA for the murders of 13 police officers. Rosenau writes that the BLA was responsible for at least 20 deaths.

On October 22, 1970, the BLA was believed to have planted a bomb in St. Brendan's Church in San Francisco while it was full of mourners attending the funeral of San Francisco police officer Harold Hamilton, who had been killed in the line of duty while responding to a bank robbery. The bomb was detonated, but no one in the church suffered serious injuries.

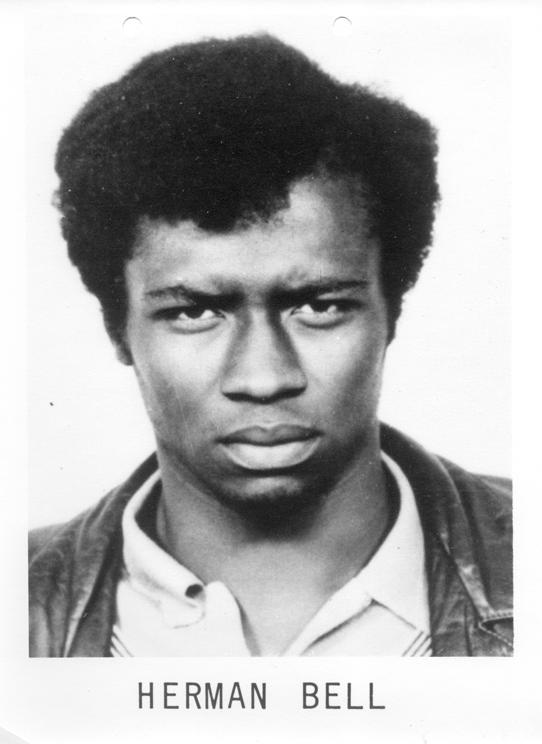
Herman Bell FBI Most Wanted Poster in 1973

On May 21, 1971, as many as five men participated in the murder of two New York City police officers, Joseph Piagentini and Waverly Jones. Those arrested and brought to trial for the shootings include Anthony Bottom (a.k.a. Jalil Muntaqim), Albert Washington, Francisco Torres, Gabriel Torres, and Herman Bell.

On August 29, 1971, three armed men murdered 51-year-old San Francisco police sergeant John Victor Young while he was working at a desk in his police station, which was almost empty at the time due to a bombing attack on a bank that took place earlier – only one other officer and a civilian clerk were there. Two days later, the San Francisco Chronicle received a letter signed by the BLA claiming responsibility for the attack. Young was shot and killed using a stolen police issued revolver, belonging to Patrolman Waverly Jones, killed in May 1971.

On November 3, 1971, Officer James R. Greene of the Atlanta Police Department was shot and killed in his patrol van at a gas station. His wallet, badge, and weapon were taken, and the evidence at the scene pointed to two suspects. The first was Twymon Myers (suspected to be one of the group's leaders), who was killed in a police shootout in 1973, and the second was Freddie Hilton (a.k.a. Kamau Sadiki), who evaded capture until 2002, when he was arrested in New York City on a separate charge and was recognized as one of the men wanted in the Greene murder. Apparently, the two men had attacked the officer to gain standing with their compatriots within the BLA.

On January 27, 1972, the BLA assassinated police officers Gregory Foster and Rocco Laurie at the corner of 174 Avenue B in New York City. After the killings, a note sent to authorities portrayed the murders as a retaliation for the prisoner deaths during the 1971 Attica Prison riot. Two suspects died in "unrelated shootouts with cops — one in New York, and one in St. Louis, with Laurie's gun in his car" and a third was sentenced in 2016 to 21 years for selling heroin to undercover police. Another suspect, Henry Brown, was tried for the murders and found not guilty. Evidence found at the scene has since been lost.

=== 1972–79: Actions and flights ===
On July 31, 1972, five armed individuals hijacked Delta Air Lines Flight 841 en route from Detroit to Miami, eventually collecting a ransom of $1 million and diverting the plane, after passengers were released, to Algeria. The authorities there seized the ransom but allowed the group to flee. Four were eventually caught by French authorities in Paris, where they were convicted of various crimes, but one—George Wright—remained a fugitive until September 26, 2011, when he was captured in Portugal. Portuguese courts rejected the pledge for extradition.

In another high-profile incident, Assata Shakur, Zayd Shakur and Sundiata Acoli were said to have opened fire on state troopers in New Jersey after being pulled over for a broken taillight. Zayd Shakur and state trooper Werner Foerster were both killed during the exchange; Assata Shakur was shot in the back and the arm. Following her capture, Assata Shakur was tried in six different criminal trials. According to Shakur, she was beaten and tortured during her incarceration in a number of different federal and state prisons. The charges against them ranged from kidnapping to assault and battery to bank robbery. Assata Shakur was found guilty by an all-white jury of the murder of both Foerster and her companion Zayd Shakur, but escaped prison in 1979. Shakur eventually fled to Cuba and received political asylum there. Acoli was convicted of killing Foerster and sentenced to life in prison. Rosenau notes that by 1973, "the BLA were still killing policemen, but these were no longer 'assassinations.' Instead, they were a result of shootouts that took place during police searches for wanted BLA members or in the course of traffic stops or other routine police operations."

In 1974, in Jacksonville, Florida, white teenager Stephen Orlando was killed by a group that used the names "Black Revolutionary Army" and "Black Liberation Army" interchangeably in their communications. The national BLA group denied any connection to this murder.

=== 1980s ===
In May 1981 BLA members James Dixon York and Anthony LaBorde were arrested for shooting two police officers during a traffic stop. Later that year a Brink's truck robbery, conducted with support from former Weather Underground members Kathy Boudin, David Gilbert and Judith Alice Clark, left a guard and two police officers dead. Boudin, Gilbert and Clark along with several BLA and May 19th Communist Organization members, were subsequently arrested.

In 1984 eight members of a New York City activist group called the Sunrise Collective were arrested on charges of plotting to rob banks and free Odinga and Balagoon from prison. A ninth person was arrested later. Some were ultimately convicted of possession of illegal weapons and false IDs but they were acquitted on more serious charges.

== Aftermath ==
=== Anarchist sympathies ===
Following the collapse of the BLA, some members — including Ashanti Alston, Donald Weems (a.k.a. Kuwasi Balagoon), and Ojore Lutalo — became outspoken proponents of anarchism. Weems died in prison of an AIDS-related disease in 1986. Alston remains active in prison support and other activist circles. Lutalo was released from prison in 2009 after serving 28 years on charges related to a shootout with a drug dealer in 1981 (and parole violation stemming from his conviction for a 1975 bank robbery), during which time he was punished with solitary confinement because of his associations with the BLA and the Anarchist Black Cross Federation.

On January 26, 2010, Lutalo was arrested for endangering public transportation while on an Amtrak train to New Jersey, after attending the Anarchist Book Fair in Los Angeles, being mistakenly identified as making terrorist threats on his cell phone. The charge was dropped for lack of evidence, and Lutalo settled a suit against the city of La Junta, Colorado, where his arrest was made, for an undisclosed amount.

=== Later trials ===
In January 2007, eight men, labelled the San Francisco 8, were charged by a joint state and federal task force with John Young's murder. The defendants have been identified as former members of the Black Liberation Army. A similar case was dismissed in 1975 when a judge ruled that police gathered evidence through the use of torture. On June 29, 2009, Herman Bell pleaded guilty to voluntary manslaughter in the death of Sgt. Young. In July 2009, charges were dropped against four of the accused: Ray Boudreaux, Henry W. Jones, Richard Brown and Harold Taylor. That same month, Jalil Muntaquim pleaded no contest to conspiracy to commit voluntary manslaughter, becoming the second person to be convicted in this case.

=== Legacy ===
Ex-BLA member Assata Shakur is considered "a hero to many US left-wing activists." She is celebrated by some groups, including the organizers of the 2017 Women's March, and Black power group Assata's Daughters. Black Lives Matter activist Alicia Garza has also praised Shakur.

== Notable members and associates ==
- Sundiata Acoli (formerly Clark Edward Squire); convicted along with Assata Shakur of the murder of a New Jersey state trooper in 1973. Released in May 2022.
- Ashanti Alston; convicted for bank robbery in 1974. Released 1985.
- Kuwasi Balagoon (formerly Donald Weems); one of the Panther 21 and later convicted for involvement in the 1981 Brink's robbery. Died in prison December 13, 1986.
- Silvia Baraldini; convicted in 1983 for participation in BLA actions. Repatriated in 1999 and paroled in 2006.
- Dhoruba bin Wahad (born Richard Earl Moore); one of the Panther 21, co-founder of the BLA, and established the Campaign to Free Black and New African Political Prisoners. Convicted for attempted murder in 1973 and released in 1990, subsequently winning lawsuits against the FBI and NYPD.
- Marilyn Buck; convicted for participation in the 1981 Brink's robbery, the escape of Assata Shakur, and other incidents. Released and died in 2010.
- Safiya Bukhari (formerly Bernice Jones); convicted on multiple charges in 1975, escaped 1976, recaptured 1977, paroled 1983.
- Judith Alice Clark; convicted for participation in the 1981 Brink's robbery. Released in 2019.
- David Gilbert and Kathy Boudin; both sent to prison for their role in the 1981 Brink's robbery. Gilbert was released in 2021. Boudin was released in 2003 and died in 2022.
- Bashir Hameed (formerly James Dixon York) (died in prison August 30, 2008) and Anthony LaBorde (a.k.a. Abdul Majid) (died in prison on April 3, 2016); convicted of the murder of a police officer in 1981.
- Jamal Joseph; American writer, director, producer, poet, activist, and educator. Member of the Black Panther Party and the Black Liberation Army. He was prosecuted as one of the Panther 21 and spent six years incarcerated at Leavenworth Penitentiary.
- Ruchell 'Cinque' Magee; perpetrator of Marin County Civic Center attacks, released in July 2023.
- Ojore Lutalo; convicted following a shootout with a drug dealer, released 2009.
- Twymon Ford Myers, died in shooting 1973.
- Jalil Muntaqim (formerly Anthony Bottom); one of the New York Three convicted of killing two policemen. Released from prison in October 2020 after over 49 years of incarceration and 11 parole denials.
- Sekou Odinga (formerly Nathaniel Burns); one of the Panther 21 and later convicted of six counts of attempted murder for participation in the 1981 Brink's robbery and other incidents. Released 2014.
- Susan Rosenberg; convicted in 1985 for possession of explosives, released 2001.
- Assata Shakur (formerly JoAnne Chesimard); named on the Most Wanted list by the FBI—the first woman ever to make the list. She was living in Cuba under political asylum until her death in 2025. She escaped custody in 1979 after being convicted in the May 2, 1973, murder of New Jersey State Trooper Werner Foerster.
- Mutulu Shakur (formerly Jeral Wayne Williams); charged with conspiracy in 1979 BLA prison break of Assata Shakur, FBI's top ten Fugitive #380. Captured in 1986 and convicted in 1988 of participating in the 1981 Brink's robbery, he received a 60-year sentence in a federal prison. Incarcerated in Victorville, he was released in December 2022. He died in 2023. Shakur was stepfather to the late rap artist Tupac Shakur.
- Russell Maroon Shoatz; convicted of the murder of a police officer in 1972. Was granted compassionate release due to advanced cancer and died less than two months later, in 2021.
- Arthur Lee Washington Jr.; FBI Ten Most Wanted Fugitive #427, wanted for 1989 attempted murder of a New Jersey state trooper. Removed from list in December 2000 as no longer meeting criteria.
- George Wright; escaped convict and 1972 hijacker; living in Portugal, which has refused to extradite him to the U.S.

== In fiction ==
The BLA was portrayed in the 1985 TV movie Badge of the Assassin.

== See also ==
- Black Guerrilla Family
- Black Revolutionary Assault Team
- George Jackson Brigade
- New Black Panther Party
- Propaganda of the deed
- Symbionese Liberation Army
- Vanguardism

== Sources ==
- Burrough, Bryan (2016). Days of Rage: America's Radical Underground, the FBI, and the Forgotten Age of Revolutionary Violence. Penguin. ISBN 978-0143107972.
- Cleaver, Kathleen; Katsiaficas, George (2014). Liberation, Imagination and the Black Panther Party: A New Look at the Black Panthers and Their Legacy. Routledge. ISBN 9781135298326.
- Silverman, Al (1974). Foster and Laurie. Little and Brown. ISBN 0316791164.
- Stanford, Maxwell (2007). We Will Return in the Whirlwind: Black Radical Organizations 1960-1975. Charles H. Kerr. ISBN 978-0-88286-314-6.
- Umoja, Akinyele (1999). "Repression Breeds Resistance: the Black Liberation Army and the radical legacy of the Black Panther Party". New Political Science. 21 (2): 131–137. doi:10.1080/07393149908429859.
