= Martin Sostre =

American activist (1923–2015)

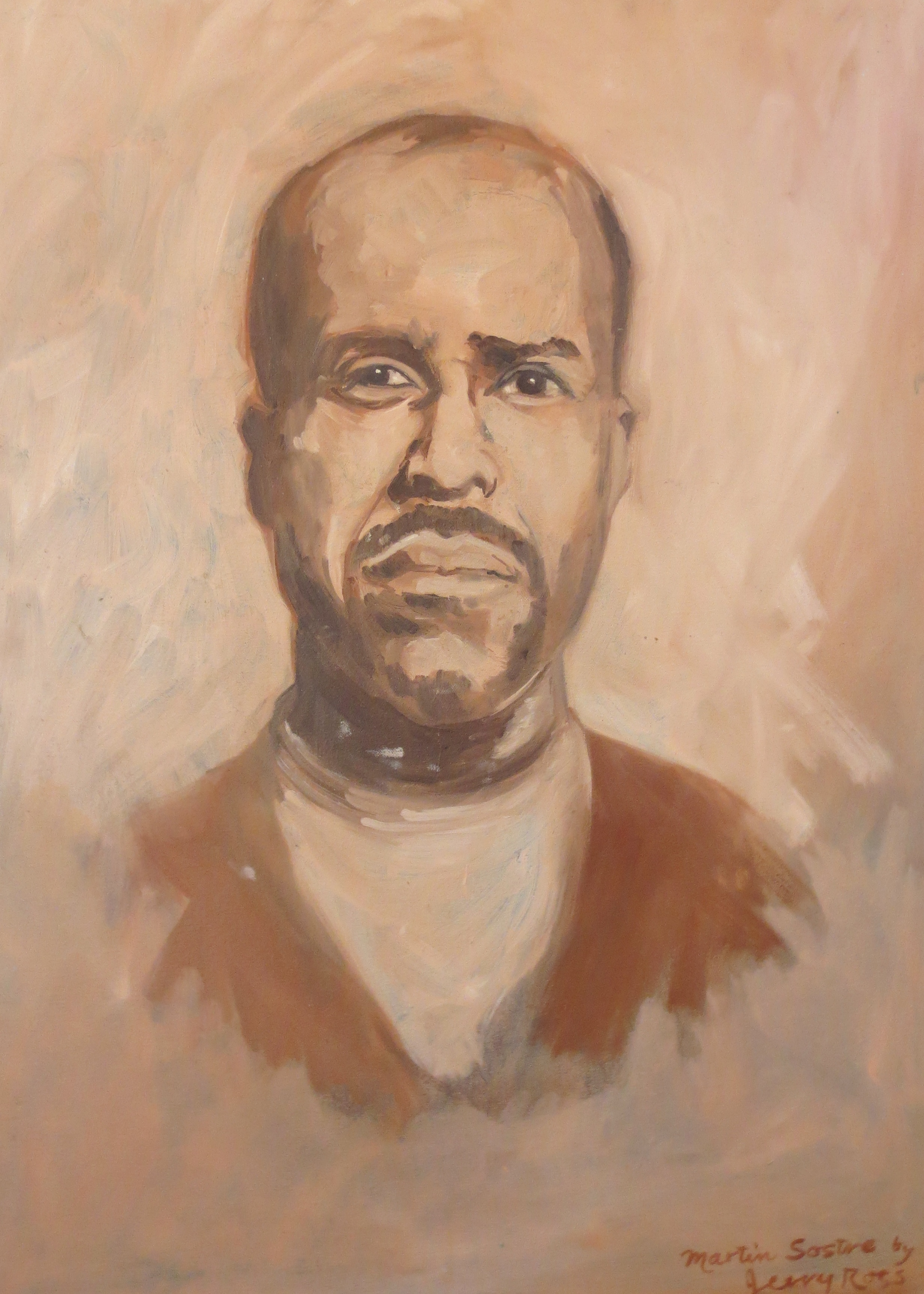
- Painting of Martin Sostre by Jerry Ross as an older man; compare photographs in Ebony
- Born: March 20, 1923; Harlem, New York, U.S.
- Died: August 12, 2015 (aged 92)
- Employer: The Afro-Asian Bookshop
- Known for: Civil rights activism, being falsely imprisoned
- Movement: Black Power, Anarchism, Black Nationalism, prisoner rights
- Criminal charges: possession of heroine, sale of a narcotics, second-degree assault (1968)
- Criminal penalty: 31 to 41 years imprisonment (9 years served)
- Criminal status: granted executive clemency (1975)

Martin Ramirez Sostre (March 20, 1923 – August 12, 2015) was an American activist known for his role in the prisoners' rights movement. He was recognized as a prisoner of conscience by Amnesty International.

== Biography ==
Sostre was born in Harlem NY on March 20, 1923 to parents Crescencia and Saturnino Sostre. His mother was a seamstress, and his father a merchant marine. After being drafted into the Army in 1942, he was dishonorably discharged.

In 1952, he was arrested for possession of heroin and sentenced to 12 years in prison. He served time at Sing Sing, Attica prison and Clinton State Prison. During his incarceration he began to study Islam, and was placed in solitary confinement for trying to start an Islamic study group.

Sostre began to study constitutional law using the prison library, and filed his first of several suits trying to defend prisoners' rights. He sued then-warden of Clinton State Prison, J.E. LaVallee for restricting the religious freedom of himself and other inmates.

Sostre was released in 1964, and in 1966, he opened the first Afro-Asian Bookstore at 1412 Jefferson in Buffalo, New York. He had saved up to start the shop by working for Bethlehem Steel.The store became a center for radical thought and education in Buffalo's Black community. He stocked the shelves with books on the subjects of Communism, anarchism, and black nationalism, as well as jazz records, making it a popular hangout for young leftists.

As Sostre details:

I taught continually - giving out pamphlets free to those who had no money. I let them sit and read for hours in the store. Some would come back every day and read the same book until they finished it. This was the opportunity I had dreamed about - to be able to help my people by increasing the political awareness of the youth.

After a series of race-related riots in the Cold Springs neighborhood where the Afro-Asian Book Shop was located, a neighboring tavern caught fire and many of the store's books were destroyed by the water the firefighters used to put it out.

That same year, Sostre and his coworker, Geraldine Robinson, were arrested at his bookstore on July 14, 1967. Sostre was charged with "with illegal sale and possession of narcotics, inciting a riot, arson, resisting arrest, and assault" and Robinson with "selling narcotics and interfering with an arrest". Of Sostre's charges:

Authorities accused Sostre of conducting $15,000 in weekly drug sales and using his basement to manufacture and distribute Molotov cocktails. Narcotics Assistant Chief of Detectives Michael Amico claimed to have motion picture evidence of drug sales and portrayed Sostre as a violent drug trafficker distributing 'bombs to hoodlums.' By the time of his trial the following year, the arson and riot charges were dropped, the motion picture footage could not be found, and the drug charges were reduced to a single $15 bag of heroin supplied by a police informant who later recanted his testimony.

Sostre would eventually be sentenced to up to 41 years by an all-white jury. These charges were later proven to be fabricated as part of a COINTELPRO program, and the key witness used in the trial later recanted his testimony.

Incarcerated once again, Sostre was this time placed at the Green Haven Correctional Facility in Dutchess County. Once there, he refused to submit to rectal examinations or to cut his beard, and was again placed in punitive solitary confinement.

Facing disciplinary measures for standing up for his rights, Sostre became a jailhouse lawyer. He regularly acted as legal counsel to other inmates and won two landmark legal cases involving prisoner rights: Sostre v. Rockefeller and Sostre v. Otis. According to Sostre, these decisions constituted "a resounding defeat for the establishment who will now find it exceedingly difficult to torture with impunity the thousands of captive black (and white) political prisoners illegally held in their concentration camps."

Sostre was placed in solitary confinement for more than 5 years. In earlier legal activity, Sostre secured religious rights for Black Muslim prisoners and also eliminated (in the words of Federal Judge Constance Motley) some of the more "outrageously inhuman aspects of solitary confinement in some of the state prisons." He was responsible for de-legitimatizing censorship of inmates' mail, invasive bodily exams, and penal solitary confinement.

In December 1973 Amnesty International put Sostre on its "prisoner of conscience" list, stating: "We became convinced that Martin Sostre has been the victim of an international miscarriage of justice because of his political beliefs ... not for his crimes ." In addition to numerous defense committees in New York State, a Committee to Free Martin Sostre, made up of prominent citizens, joined in an effort to publicize Sostre's case and to petition the New York Governor Hugh Carey for his release. On December 7, 1975, Russian Nobel Peace Laureate Andrei Sakharov added his name to the clemency appeal. Governor Carey granted Sostre clemency on Christmas Eve of 1975; after receiving appeals from Ramsey Clark, Phillip Berrigan, Daniel Berrigan, Rev. Ralph D. Abernathy, Julian Bond and Angela Davis. Sostre was released from prison in February 1976.

Sostre died on August 12, 2015.

== Legacy ==
Black anarchist writer and activist Lorenzo Kom'boa Ervin attributes his initial interest in anarchism to Sostre.

In 1974, Pacific Street Films debuted a short documentary film on Sostre called Frame-up! The Imprisonment of Martin Sostre detailing Sostre's case with in-prison interviews.

In 2012, activist Mariame Kaba lamented the lack of biographies on Sostre.

In November 2017, the Frank E. Merriweather Jr. Library hosted To and From 1967: A Rebellion with Martin Sostre, an event commemorating the 50th anniversary of the Black rebellion on Buffalo's East side. The event included an installation created by a local eastside artist called Reviving Sostre. The installation consisted of three bookshelves painted by the artists and placed in the lobby of the Merriweather Library, which was built on the same location one of Sostre's bookstores used to stand.

In 2019, four years after his death, the New York Times published an obituary of Sostre in their "Overlooked No More" series, "obituaries about remarkable people whose deaths ... went unreported in The Times" and intended to include people from marginalized backgrounds whose profiles had not been included.

The Martin Sostre Institute maintains a website that includes an archive of Sostre's writings, photos and films about Sostre, and information about court cases in which he was involved. In March 2023, the Institute co-hosted a birthday centennial celebration for Sostre alongside the New York Public Library's Jail & Prison Services team, the NYPL's Harry Belafonte Library, and the Schomburg Center for Research in Black Culture.

== See also ==
- Third-worldism
- Anarcho-communism
- Civil rights
- Libertarian socialism

== References and sources ==
Sources

- Copeland, Vincent (1970). The Crime of Martin Sostre (1st ed.). McGraw-Hill.
- Wicker, Tom (December 8, 1974). "Iron of Martin Sostre". New York Times.
- McLaughlin, Malcolm (2014). "Storefront revolutionary: Martin Sostre's Afro-Asian Bookshop, black liberation culture, and the New Left, 1964–75". The Sixties: A Journal of History, Politics and Culture. 7: 1–27. doi:10.1080/17541328.2014.930265. S2CID 146674495.
- Felber, Garrett (2018). "'Shades of Mississippi': The Nation of Islam's Prison Organizing, the Carceral State, and the Black Freedom Struggle". The Journal of American History. 105: 71–95. doi:10.1093/jahist/jay008.
- Schaich, Warren L.; Hope, Diane S. (March 1977). "The Prison Letters of Martin Sostre: Documents of Resistance" (PDF). Journal of Black Studies. 7 (3): 281–300. doi:10.1177/002193477700700303. S2CID 143383200.
- Felber, Garrett (May 16, 2016). "Martin Sostre and the Fight Against Solitary Confinement". Black Perspectives. AAIHS.
- Symonds, Alexandria (April 24, 2019). "Overlooked No More: Martin Sostre, Who Reformed America's Prisons From His Cell". The New York Times. p. 11.
- Gavroche, Julius (August 13, 2020). "Remembering Martin Sostre". autonomies.
- Anderson, William (August 12, 2020). "The unforgettable life of prison rebel Martin Sostre". ROAR Magazine.
- Dunn, Alec (January 6, 2009). "Buffalo Street Art". Justseeds.
