= Safiya Bukhari =

American political activist (1950–2003)

- Born: Bernice Jones; April 2, 1950; The Bronx, New York, U.S.
- Died: August 24, 2003 (aged 53); North Shore University Hospital, Queens, New York, U.S.
- Occupation: Political activist
- Known for: Former member of the Black Panther Party

Safiya Bukhari (born Bernice Jones; April 2, 1950 – August 24, 2003) was an American member of the Black Panther Party. She was a co-founder of the Free Mumia Abu-Jamal Coalition (NYC) and the Jericho Movement for U.S. Political Prisoners and Prisoners of War, and was the vice president of the Republic of New Afrika.

== Early life ==
She was born in The Bronx in 1950, one of ten children in a "devoutly Christian, middle-class family." She planned on becoming a doctor and attended New York City Community College as a premed student, pledging at the college's only integrated sorority. Bukhari's political awakening did not happen until college. On a sorority trip, she encountered a Black Panther member selling newspapers who asked if she and her friends wanted to volunteer with the Free Breakfast for Children program.

== Black Panther Party and Black Liberation Army ==
Along with some of her sorority sisters, Bukhari began volunteering with the Free Breakfast program. She discovered that the police were spreading rumors that the Panthers were feeding the children poisoned food. Bukhari noted, "They didn't have a breakfast program in the schools themselves, they were not making an effort to feed the children, but they didn't want us to feed the children." In 1969, she witnessed an officer harassing a Panther who was selling papers in Times Square. When she told the officer the Panther had a right to disseminate political literature, she was arrested. According to her, those incidents led to her officially joining the Black Panther Party.

She worked out of the Party's Harlem office, becoming in charge of Information and Communications for the East Coast Panthers. Bukhari was critical of the Party's treatment of female Panthers. In 1969, she gave birth to a daughter, Wonda Jones, whose father Robert Webb was killed during the Party's split. In 1971, she converted to Islam. After being subpoenaed to testify about the Black Liberation Army (BLA) in April 1974, she went "underground" with the BLA to avoid testifying.

== Arrest and incarceration ==
On January 25, 1975, Bukhari was captured after a shooting in Norfolk, VA that left a fellow BLA member dead and another shot in the face. She was charged with illegal possession of a weapon, felony murder, and attempted robbery. At her arraignment, her own lawyer threatened to have her bound and gagged. The jury selection, trial and sentencing all happened in one day, and she was not allowed in court during her trial. She was sentenced to 40 years. Bukhari was sent to Virginia Correctional Center for Women. She was considered the "most dangerous inmate" there.

She needed surgery, but was denied treatment by prison personnel. On New Year's Eve 1976, Bukhari attempted to escape, after one month of frequent hemorrhaging for which she was not allowed to see a doctor. She was captured two months later and returned to Virginia.

While imprisoned, Bukhari and fellow inmates founded a program called Mothers Inside Loving Kids (MILK) to prevent the separation of children from incarcerated mothers. Bukhari also filed a lawsuit against the Virginia prison system for US$1.45 million in 1979, alleging that her segregation in prison was unconstitutional and amounted to cruel and unusual punishment, as well as deprivation of equal protection and due process of law.

In August 1983, she was released on parole, with the condition of never associating with BLA or the Panthers again.

== Later life ==
In 1984, Bukhari married anarchist Ashanti Alston. She worked as a social worker at the Legal Aid Society.

Bukhari continued to be politically active after she was paroled. In 1992, she helped form the New York chapter of the Free Mumia Abu-Jamal Coalition. In 1998, she helped coordinate the Jericho March and Rally for U.S. Political Prisoners and Prisoners of War in Washington, D.C. Jericho became, as she described it, "a movement with a defined goal of getting recognition that political prisoners exist inside the prisons of the United States, despite the government's denial." Bukhari was also involved in the Malcolm X Grassroots Movement. She co-hosted the radio show "Where We Live" with Sally O'Brien on WBAI, focusing on prison-related issues.

Bukhari was the vice president of the Republic of New Afrika, a provisional government working to form a Black nation composed of South Carolina, Georgia, Alabama, Mississippi and Louisiana, "states built on the backs of enslaved Africans."

On August 24, 2003, Bukhari died of heart failure at North Shore University Hospital in Queens, NY. After her death, Abu-Jamal said from prison that she "was a true revolutionary. Patient, constant, disciplined, and determined ... [who, like Che] Guevara, was 'motivated by great feeling of love.'"

Her papers were published posthumously after her daughter Wonda Jones asked Laura Whitehorn to help her collect, edit and publish them. Her papers became The War Before: The True Life Story of Becoming a Black Panther, Keeping the Faith in Prison and Fighting for Those Left Behind, published in 2010 by The Feminist Press.
