= Black Revolutionary Assault Team =

Short-lived American far-left organization that operated out of NYC

- Black Revolutionary Assault Team
- Leader: Larry Pearson
- Dates active: April–September 1971
- Headquarters: New York City
- Active regions: New York City, United States
- Size: ~5-10

The Black Revolutionary Assault Team (BRAT) was a small Black nationalist group that carried out a few bombings in New York City in 1971.

== Activities and Armed Actions ==
The group first surfaced after an attack on the South African consular office at 11AM April 12, 1971, which destroyed an outer wall. The BRAT called the Associated Press and took credit for the attack claiming it was protesting apartheid.

BRAT's second and final action took place on September 20, 1971, when it placed bombs at the UN Missions of Republic of the Congo (Kinshasa) and the Republic of Malawi. The Congo bomb was placed at the top of a stairway outside the door of the second floor office of the mission. The 11:33AM blasts' main force was downward and jolted a glass panel door off its hinges and sent flying glass onto three passers-by. Nobody in the mission was hurt, but Jodie Della Femina, the three-year-old daughter of Jerry Della Femina, was struck by the flying glass and suffered six facial lacerations to the eyelid, cheek, lip and chin, necessitating 2 hours of surgery and 75-100 stitches. She also lost an upper front tooth. Her nine-year-old brother Michael and mother Barbara sustained minor injuries.

Shortly after the blasts the United Press International received a telephone message:

The Black Revolutionary Assault Team has just bombed the Congo mission. We bombed it because it refused to allow our freedom fighters to cross their country to get to Angola.

The caller also claimed that the group had planted a bomb at the Malawi mission four blocks from the Congo site. The Malawian mission was evacuated as police found and defused a 15-inch (380 mm) low-grade pipe bomb.

Minutes before the Congo bomb exploded Larry Pearson, an eighteen-year-old black Louis Brandeis High School student rushed into a taxi operated by Marvin Ellias. Ellias noted that the youth was nervous and "acting suspiciously", and then he heard the explosion. The cab driver alerted his dispatcher through his car radio and then drove around until he found a traffic cop who arrested Pearson. After more than five hours of questioning, Pearson was charged with arson, possession of a bomb and a loaded weapon, and criminal mischief, and held on $50,000 bond.

== See also ==
- George Jackson Brigade
- Black Liberation Army
- Symbionese Liberation Army
