= Bayside State Prison =

Prison in New Jersey, United States

Coordinates: 39.241659°N 74.951971°W

- Interactive map of Bayside State Prison
- Location: 4293 Route 47 Leesburg, New Jersey
- Status: Open
- Capacity: 2206
- Opened: 1970
- Managed by: New Jersey Department of Corrections

Bayside State Prison (BSP) is a state prison for men located in Leesburg, Maurice River Township, New Jersey.

The prison was originally the Leesburg State Prison. In 1988, the prison was renamed to "Bayside State Prison". Some Leesburg residents stated dissatisfaction with the renaming since it was the only widely known aspect of the Leesburg community.

Launched in 1977, the prison is one of eight New Jersey correctional institutions which participate in the AgriIndustires program. Inmates are given work opportunities to reduce recidivism, including at the prison's dairy operation. Prisoners work seven hours per day and the milk is sent and processed to Jones Farm in Ewing. As of November 8th, 2022 the dairy farm operations closed with the shipment of milking cows and heifers to New Holland Sales Stable dairy cow auction in Pennsylvania.

In 2020, a senior Bayside corrections officer was fired after he was seen participating in a reenactment of the murder of George Floyd, mocking protesters. The New Jersey Department of Corrections, which operates the prison, called it "hateful and disappointing", and Governor Phil Murphy condemned it, calling it repugnant.

== Notable prisoners ==
- George Wright (escaped in 1970) – he may have used the warden's car during his getaway
