= Delta Air Lines Flight 841 =

1972 aircraft hijacking

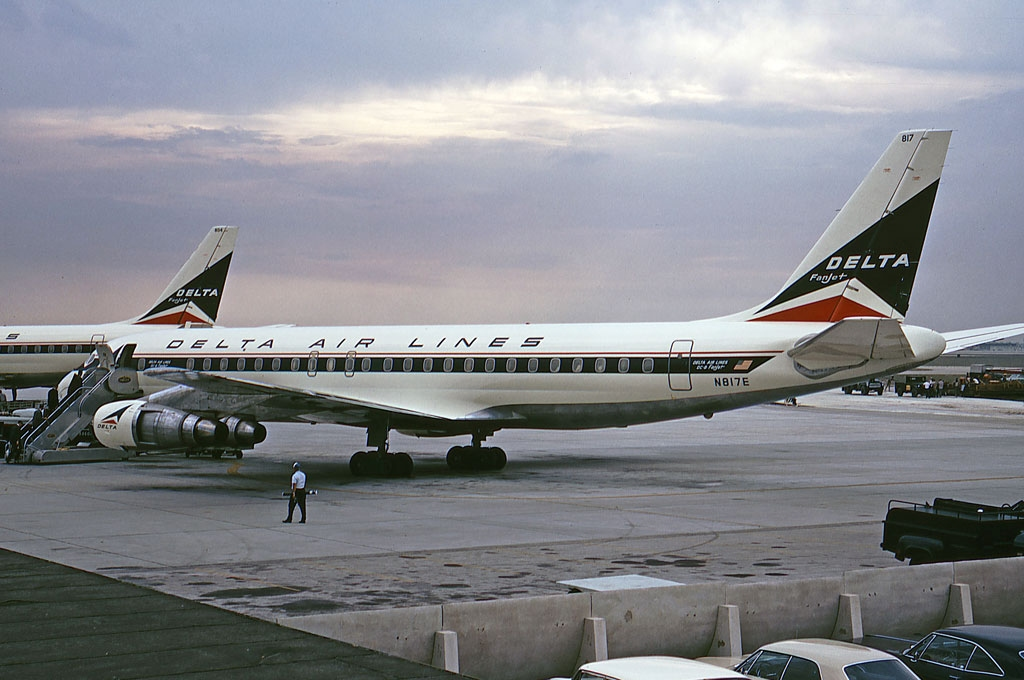
- N817E, the DC-8 involved in the hijacking, at Orlando International Airport in 1966.

Hijacking
- Date: July 31 – August 2, 1972
- Summary: Hijacking
- Site: United States, Algeria

Aircraft
- Aircraft type: Douglas DC-8-51
- Operator: Delta Air Lines
- IATA flight No.: DL841
- ICAO flight No.: DAL841
- Call sign: DELTA 841
- Registration: N817E
- Flight origin: Detroit Metropolitan Airport, Michigan
- 1st stopover: Logan International Airport, Massachusetts
- 2nd stopover: Houari Boumediene Airport, Algiers, Algeria
- Destination: Miami International Airport, Florida
- Occupants: 101
- Passengers: 94
- Crew: 7
- Fatalities: 0
- Injuries: 1
- Survivors: 101

Delta Air Lines Flight 841 was an aircraft hijacking that took place beginning on July 31, 1972, on a Douglas DC-8 flight originally from Detroit to Miami.

== Hijacking ==
There were 7 crew and 94 passengers on board the Douglas DC-8 for the flight from Detroit to Miami. Members of the Black Liberation Army took over the aircraft in flight using weapons smuggled on board, including a handgun hidden inside a Bible with its pages cut out to form a cavity. None of the hostages were killed during the hijacking.

Five hijackers who had boarded with three children took over the aircraft. It flew to Miami as originally scheduled, where the 86 passenger hostages were released. The aircraft was then flown to Boston, where they picked up a flight engineer who was qualified to fly the plane overseas. Working with FBI agents on-site, Boston Delta airport maintenance foreman Ronald S. Fudge was chosen to refuel the plane and deliver the flight engineer to the plane. He also delivered a bag containing the $1 million ransom and other bags containing provisions requested by the hijackers, including cigarettes, apples, and ham and cheese sandwiches. After refueling and taking on the engineer and provisions, the plane was dispatched to the runway and flew to Algeria. Algerian authorities seized the aircraft and ransom which were returned to the U.S. with the crew hostages, but the hijackers were released after a few days.

== Return of crew and aircraft ==
On the evening of Wednesday, August 2, 1972, at a hurried 10-minute news conference after the DC-8's completion of the 11,500 miles (18,500 km) trip in Atlanta, the captain said he realized the aircraft was being hijacked when he left the cockpit to go to the lavatory and noticed a man aiming a gun at a stewardess. One of the hijackers held a stewardess, Jamye Mays of Pell City, Alabama, at gunpoint throughout the incident. The stewardess had been with the airline less than two weeks. "They did it as a threat when they thought their instructions were not going to be carried out", the captain said.

The crew had an overnight stay in Barcelona, Spain, after leaving Algeria. In addition to the ransom, a Delta spokesman said the trip cost $21,600 for fuel and salaries for the crew. Delta identified the crew members as Captain William Harold May, First Officer D.L. Henderson, and R.R. Kubal, and stewardesses Shirley Ann Morgan, Sherrill Elise Ross, Jamye Mays, and Leanne Marie Arnfield.

== Apprehension of hijackers ==
Four of the five hijackers were captured in Paris on May 26, 1976, and tried by the French courts. The remaining hijacker, George Wright, who had dressed as a priest during the hijacking, was arrested on September 26, 2011, in Sintra, Portugal. Wright was an accomplice in a 1962 armed robbery and homicide who had escaped from a prison in New Jersey before joining in the hijacking.

The four hijackers who had been living in France since 1973—George Brown, Joyce Brown, Melvin McNair, and Jean McNair—were arrested by French police in 1976 after the US pressured French officials, since France does not extradite political exiles. Prior to their arrest, they purportedly received lodging and training from Curiel Apparatus, along with attempting to obtain plastic surgery and fake identity documents in order to secretly enter the US. The two men served three years in French prisons; and the women received suspended sentences because they had children. George Brown and Melvin McNair were released in 1981, and all four remained to live and work in France with their families. George Wright was the lone Panther who fled to Portugal from France and has lived in Portugal with his family since the early 1980s. Portugal has denied US authorities his extradition because Wright is a Portuguese citizen and protected by its constitution.

== In film ==
In 2011, a documentary titled Nobody Knows My Name was made about the hijacking. According to Mikhael Ganouna, the producer of the film, George Brown was living in Paris but was not worried about being extradited because he had already served his sentence.

In 2012, a documentary titled Melvin & Jean: An American Story was made by director Maia Wechsler. Melvin McNair and his wife Jean were working at an orphanage in the French town of Caen, where reportedly they had turned their lives around completely. McNair was known for coaching American baseball, teaching youth the art and strategy of the sport. Jean McNair died on October 24, 2014.
