= Black anarchism =

African diasporic adherents of anarchist principles

Black anarchism, also known as New Afrikan anarchism or Panther anarchism, is an anti-authoritarian and anti-racist current of the Black power movement and anarchism in the United States. It is characterized by its intersectional analysis of different forms of oppression, its skepticism of both authoritarian socialism and Eurocentric anarchism, and its advocacy of community organizing, armed self-defense and revolutionary black nationalism.

Black anarchism draws its origins back to the work of Lucy Parsons, who developed a form of social anarchism with an intersectional analysis and called for Black self-determination. After World War II, links formed between anarcho-pacifists and Black activists of the civil rights movement, leading to the development of an anti-authoritarian tendency within the latter, with some groups such as the Student Nonviolent Coordinating Committee (SNCC) adopting a decentralized structure. Anarchism also partly inspired the programs of the Black Panther Party (BPP) and fit into its intersectional analysis of the relationship between white supremacy, economic exploitation and political repression by the state.

Black anarchism as a distinct tendency first emerged from the radicalization of some rank-and-file members of the BPP, who were critical of the centralization of power under the party leadership. These people included Ashanti Alston, Kuwasi Balagoon, Lorenzo Kom'boa Ervin, Greg Jackson, and Martin Sostre. Their anti-authoritarian analysis of the BPP leadership led them to encounter anarchism, which they adopted due to its anti-authoritarian commitment to decentralization and consensus decision-making. Upon entering the American anarchist movement, these Black anarchists found that White anarchists were often unreceptive to their ideas on anti-racism and Black autonomy. As a result, Black anarchists established their own organizations, dedicated to pursuing anarchist approaches to anti-racist struggles and strengthening anti-racism within the anarchist movement.

== History ==
=== Roots ===
When Black activists first joined the American anarchist movement, largely dominated by White men, they added perspectives of anti-racism to the existing focus on class struggle. Nascent Black anarchism was distinguished from White American and European anarchism due to the experience that Black anarchists had with racism, which brought them to prominence within anti-racist social movements. Black anarchism highlighted the institutional racism within the white anarchist movement, which suppressed participation by Black people, and sought to build a movement that better represented Black people and drew from their experiences.

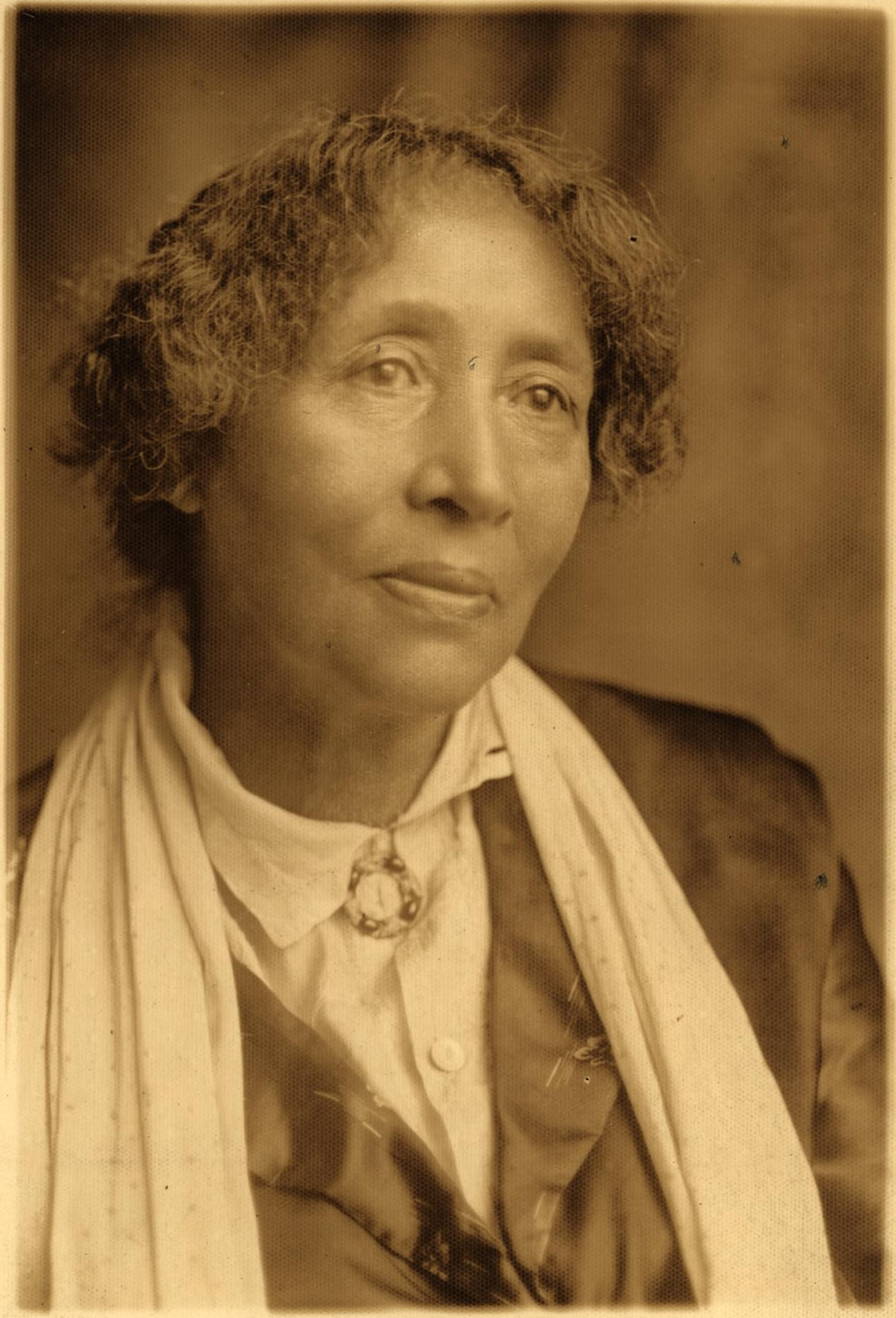
Lucy Parsons, an early social anarchist that advocated for black self-determination and armed self-defense

Lucy Parsons developed a form of social anarchism that concerned itself with both the labor and civil rights movements, as she considered racism to have stemmed from capitalism. She drew attention to the intersectional oppression of people of color, including widespread lynchings in the Southern United States, which had previously been neglected by White anarchists. In The Alarm, the newspaper of the International Working People's Association (IWPA), Parsons publicised a lynching of thirteen African Americans that had taken place in Carrollton, Mississippi. In her article, titled "The Negro", she discussed the poverty that many African Americans lived in, demonstrating the connection between racism and classism, and called on African Americans to resist their oppression through racial uplift, self-determination and armed self-defense. Parsons' views on the dual racial and class oppression of African Americans led her to encourage them to join the socialist movement, as she considered that the dissolution of the state and the end of capitalism were necessary to create an anti-racist society.

=== Emergence from civil rights movement ===
In the wake of World War II, Black activists of the nascent civil rights movement began to form links with White American anarchists. This led to a notable influence of anarcho-pacifism on the movement, with Martin Luther King contributing to David Dellinger's magazine Liberation and Bayard Rustin finding employment with the War Resisters League (WRL). Anti-authoritarian practices were subsequently adopted by civil rights organizations such as the Student Nonviolent Coordinating Committee (SNCC), which Paul Goodman allegedly described as an essentially "anarchist organization". Under the influence of Ella Baker, who declared that "strong people don't need strong leaders", the SNCC was organized along a decentralized and grassroots structure, and remained independent of other civil rights organizations.

Over time, Black anti-authoritarians grew increasing critical of the movement's leadership, the Big Six, who they accused of opportunism and corruption. In a class analysis of the movement, Ojore Lutalo declared that the leadership didn't have the interests of all black people in mind: "Just look at how they live today and look at how we live." In reaction to the prevailing liberalism of the civil rights movement, and its perceived failure to achieve racial equality, the Black power movement first came into being. The movement initially dedicated itself to electing Black people to political office and establishing black nationalist groups, but later distanced itself from integration and began to focus on ways to achieve autonomy from the United States. Unlike Black liberalism, which saw racial inequality in the United States as having stemmed from Social exclusion and racial intolerance, the Black power movement considered inequality to be a product of institutional white supremacy.

=== Development within the Black Panther Party ===
In its "Ten Point Program", the Black Panther Party (BPP) took a critical stance on the intersections between white supremacy and the economic exploitation and political repression of Black communities. Furthering this intersectional analysis, many Panthers extended this into a critique of patriarchy, social stratification and the state. The Panthers were also influenced in part by anarchism, publishing Sergey Nechayev's Catechism of a Revolutionary and creating their own version of the Diggers' free food distribution system, the Free Breakfast for Children Program, which itself influenced the later work of Food Not Bombs. The Panthers and other Black power organizations of this period upheld a revolutionary form of Black nationalism, advocating for autonomy from White society and for Black communities themselves to build that autonomy.

During the late 1960s, violent clashes between Panthers and the police became more common, as the former became increasingly frustrated with a lack of progress on racial equality and the latter intensified political repression against Black activists, who became targets of COINTELPRO. At the same time, corporations attempted to stem the radicalization of the movement by increasing funding for more moderate organizations, such as the National Association for the Advancement of Colored People (NAACP) and the National Urban League (NUL). By the 1970s, declining membership numbers in the BPP and the "oligarchization" of the party leadership led to the political polarization of its remaining members and the radicalization of some towards armed struggle against the state. The party experienced a split, as the Oakland-based central committee reoriented itself towards electoralism. Meanwhile, many of the party's autonomous groups throughout the country fractured along various different lines, with some becoming involved in community organizing and moving towards anarchism.

Drawing on elite theory, some rank-and-file members began to see the party leadership as responsible for the party's decline, as the BPP was transformed from a "large decentralized, revolutionary organization" into a "small, highly centralized, reformist group" under the one-man rule of Huey P. Newton. Kuwasi Balagoon became increasingly disillusioned with the party's leadership structure, as the central committee divorced itself from and dictated commands to other chapters around the country, without any internal democracy. He adopted an anti-authoritarian analysis of the party, which he characterized as a "hierarchy"; Balagoon believed that the party had declined due to its leadership's turn away from organizing towards fundraising, its top-down structure that stifled the rank-and-file, and the development of a quasi-capitalist class within the party leadership. Others, like Martin Sostre, accused Bobby Seale of selling out and attempting to join the "pig system". Ashanti Alston himself expressed regret for his "uncritical acceptance" of the party leadership: "After all, what does it say about you, if you allow someone to set themselves up as your leader and make all your decisions for you?" Both Sostre and Alston believed that the party's Marxist-Leninist orientation made it inclined towards political repression and intolerant of spontaneity and participatory democracy.

At this time, Eldridge Cleaver's New York-based faction had split off from the party to establish the Black Liberation Army (BLA). Many Panthers on the East Coast, including the anti-authoritarians Ashanti Alston and Kuwasi Balagoon, joined Cleaver's BLA, which they intended to serve as the military wing of the Black power movement. Another organization that advocated for Black armed self-defence, the Philadelphia-based MOVE, even took up anarchist politics, favouring autonomous and cooperative forms of living and upholding animal rights and environmentalism.

=== Growth of the tendency ===
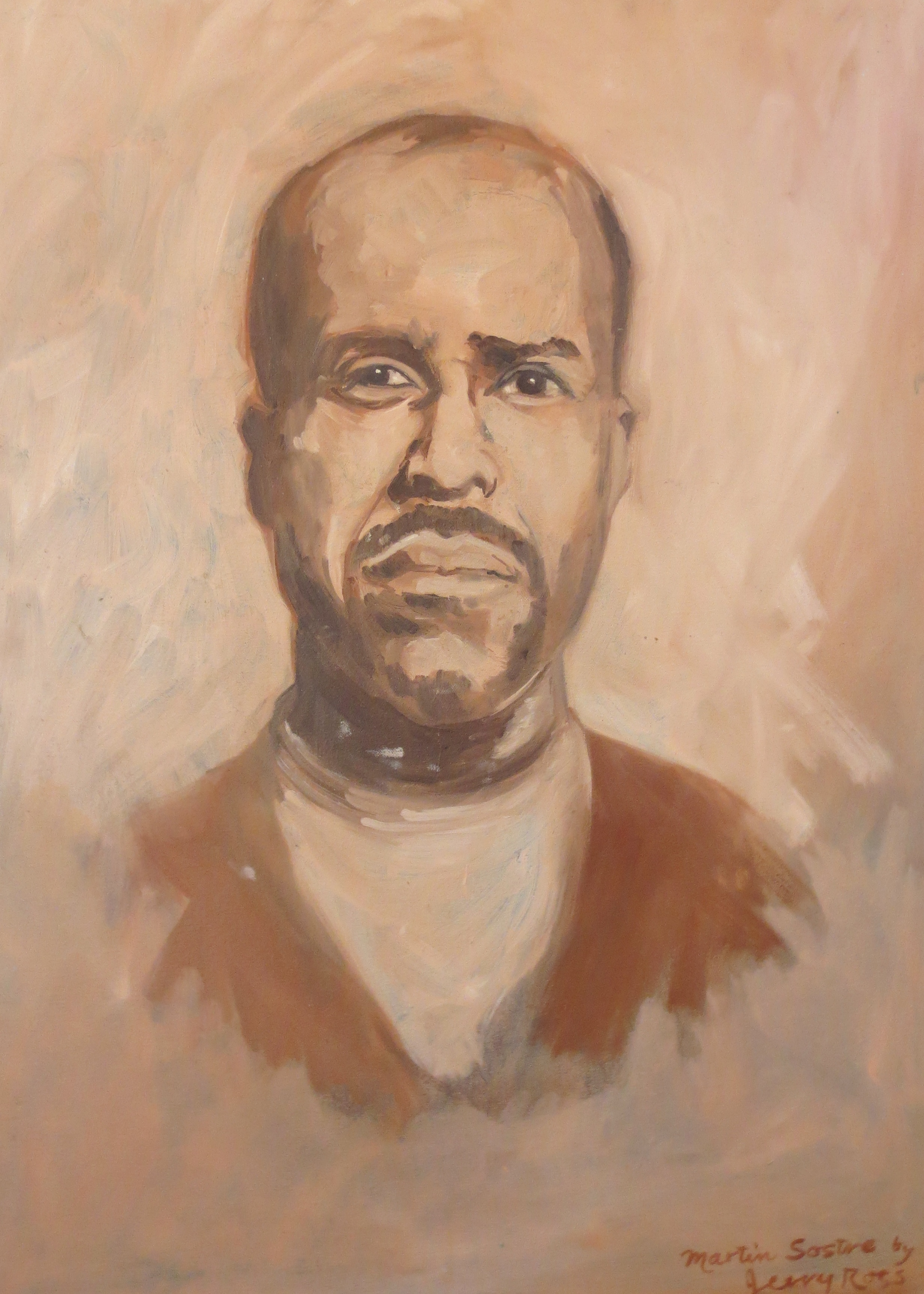
Martin Sostre, one of the first Black activists to adopt anarchist philosophy

One of the first Black activists to convert to anarchism was the African American bookstore owner Martin Sostre, who was already considering anarchist ideas in the late 1960s. By 1972, he had begun studying sketches of Mikhail Bakunin and Peter Kropotkin, but remained cautious of introducing anarchism into the Black community, worrying that others would not be able to relate to them. Over the years, Sostre developed a critique of the BPP's Marxism-Leninism, which he considered to be a program for replacing ruling elites rather than improving freedom and equality.

Anarchist ideas then spread through Black activist circles by word of mouth. It was Sostre who introduced anarchist ideas to Lorenzo Kom'boa Ervin, who deepened his understanding of the subject during his time in prison in the early 1970s. Experiences with incarceration played a large role in radicalizing Panther activists towards anarchism, as time in prison gave them space to re-assess the movement's weaknesses. Ashanti Alston was himself introduced to anarchism by the Panther activist Frankie Ziths, who wrote of Black activists' need to learn from the history of the Makhnovshchina, lest they themselves be betrayed by White communist activists. Ojore Lutalo was likewise introduced to critiques of Marxism by Kuwasi Balagoon, who considered Marxism to be ineffective for organizing Black communities and opposed its tendency towards bureaucracy and political repression. Lutalo himself became convinced of the efficacy of consensus decision-making, believing that people had the capacity to govern themselves without being ordered to by individuals or organizations with political power. Drawing from this attitude, Alston summed anarchism up as "power to the people where it stays with the people".

While this group was united by their identification with anarchism, their individual perspectives on racial identity influenced their adoption of different labels for themselves. In his book Anarchism and the Black Revolution, Ervin described this new group as "Black anarchists", although this label wasn't universally adopted. Balagoon and Lutalo self-identified as "New Afrikan anarchists", emphasising their identity as Africans rather than "African Americans". Alston himself took the label of "anarchist Panther", under which he published a magazine during the early 21st century.

=== Entry into the anarchist movement ===
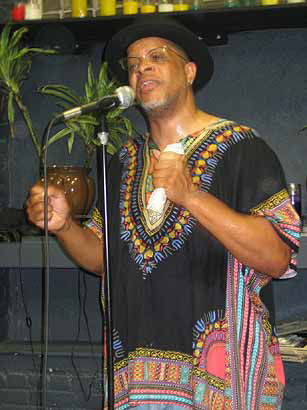
Ashanti Alston, one of the leading figures of black anarchism in the 1990s

Throughout the 1970s and 1980s, American anarchist organizations began to take up the anti-racism of the Black power movement, culminating in 1990, with the establishment of the Love and Rage Revolutionary Anarchist Federation, which itself included Black anarchist members such as Ashanti Alston and Lorenzo Kom'boa Ervin. However, following their entry into the American anarchist movement, Black anarchists found that their ideas on anti-racism were rejected by many White anarchists. Black anarchists struggled to achieve representation within the movement, which they felt emphasised the pressing need for intersectional analysis within anarchism.

Balagoon was particularly critical of White American anarchists for their lack of understanding of white supremacy and racism, as well as their opposition to national liberation movements. Alston himself argued that White American anarchists were ignorant of the African American experience with white supremacy, which damaged their ability to be effective anti-racist allies. The Industrial Workers of the World (IWW) and Love and Rage Revolutionary Anarchist Federation resisted Ervin's efforts to establish autonomous working groups for people of color, with some leading members accusing him of "separatism". To Ervin, the reluctance of white anarchists to allow people of color their own spaces had stifled their interactions and even culminated in expressions of racism and condescension, resulting in him feeling out of place in the "overwhelmingly White, middle-class, and for the most part, pacifist" movement. Despite this, Ervin continued to advocate for Black anarchism and attempt to establish spaces for anarchist people of color, believing that African and Latin American people would inevitably come to "constitute the backbone of the US anarchist movement in the future."

The Black anarchist movement's approach to anti-racism, which drew on the BPP's earlier targeting of racist institutions, contrasted with majority White anti-racist organizations such as Anti-Racist Action (ARA), which focused on opposing overt manifestations of racism and white supremacy such as the Ku Klux Klan. Black anarchists were critical of the ARA for its focus on overt racism as opposed to institutions of structural racism, as well as its racial color blindness. Despite these issues, many anarchist organizations began to draw on some of the BPP's earlier tactics, establishing Copwatch and Anarchist Black Cross (ABC) networks to respectively oppose police brutality and support political prisoners. Over the years, anarchists increasingly noted commonalities between their own principles and those of the black power movement, including their shared advocacy of people power and mutual aid.

=== Contemporary movement ===
During the 1990s, Black anarchists established their own organizations, such as the Black Autonomy Network of Community Organizers (BANCO) and the Federation of Black Community Partisans (FBCP), which gained chapters throughout the country and introduced anarchist approaches to movements against racial inequality in the United States. Greg Jackson also published the newspaper Black Autonomy, which over its four-year run introduced more people to Black anarchist ideas and publicised news of police brutality and urban insurrections. Black anarchists also participated in the Anarchist People of Color (APOC) movement, which brought together African, Asian and Latin American anarchists throughout the United States. APOC collectives provided safe spaces (described as a quilombo by Pedro Ribeiro) for its members to provide each other with solidarity and strategize on anti-racist initiatives, away from the prejudices of the White majority anarchist movement.

== Worldview ==
Drawing from the perspectives of the early Black power movement, Black anarchism takes an intersectional analysis of oppression, is critical of reformism and advocates for revolutionary nationalism. Black anarchists are intensely critical of authoritarian leadership structures and top-down organizations that separate the leaders from the led, which they see as having contributed to the failure of Black power organizations such as the BPP. Although they reject the authoritarianism of the BPP, they continue to uphold its platform of community organizing and mutual aid, which they believe can increase the influence of anarchism among marginalized people. They also advocate for the armed self-defense and self-organization of marginalized communities.

Black anarchism is critical of all forms of oppression, and thus upholds not only anti-statism, but also anti-authoritarianism, anti-capitalism, anti-clericalism, anti-homophobia, anti-imperialism, anti-racism and anti-sexism. According to Lorenzo Kom'boa Ervin, African Americans can fight against oppression in all its manifestations by engaging in traditional anarchist practices, including boycotts, labor strikes, rent strikes and tax resistance, as well as by participating in the police abolition movement. Ervin also proposes that each community's needs be met by the communities themselves through the establishment of community councils, mutual societies and cooperatives, and by extending common ownership over food distribution, education and industrial production.

Black anarchism thus upholds a revolutionary approach to Black nationalism. Ashanti Alston considers black nationalism to have been an effective way to unite African Americans and drive forward social change, despite its historical problems with sexism and hierarchy. Alston proposes that revolutionary nationalists themselves are obliged to resolve any such problematic hierarchies within their movement, which would provide an anti-authoritarian approach to nationalism.

Black anarchists generally rejected narrow or explicit forms of anarchism that ignore issues of race and national oppression. Pedro Ribeiro defines it as a deformed "white, petty-bourgeois Anarchism that cannot relate to the people" and that refuses to talk or deal with issues of race by saying "No, don't talk about racism unless it is in that very abstract sense of we-are-all-equal-let's-sing-kumbayas-and-pretend-the-color-of-our-skin-does-not-matter anti-racism."

=== Contemporary ===
Most recently, activists and scholars have emphasized the importance of Black anarchism in the formation of histories surrounding the Black Liberation Army, Black Panther Party and other modes of the Black radical tradition beginning with slave rebellions in the European colonies of the late 18th century to the present day. In As Black As Resistance: Finding the Conditions of Liberation, activists William C. Anderson, Mariame Kaba and Zoé Samudzi, describe the necessity of Black anarchism in current political struggles, arguing that:

"Black Americans are residents of a settler colony, not truly citizens of the United States. Despite a constitution laden with European Enlightenment values and a document of independence declaring certain inalienable rights, Black existence was legally that of private property until postbellum emancipation. The Black American condition today is an evolved condition directly connected to this history of slavery, and that will continue to be the case as long as the United States remains as an ongoing settler project. Nothing short of a complete dismantling of the American state as it presently exists can or will disrupt this."

== See also ==
- Anarchism and nationalism
- African anarchism
- Black separatism
- Prison abolition movement
- Zabalaza Anarchist Communist Front

== Bibliography ==
- Harrell, Willie J. Jr. (2012). ""I am an Anarchist": The Social Anarchism of Lucy E. Parsons". Journal of International Women's Studies. 13 (1): 1–18. ISSN 1539-8706. OCLC 8093224507.
- Heynen, Nik; Rhodes, Jason (2015). "Organizing for Survival: From the Civil Rights Movement to Black Anarchism through the Life of Lorenzo Kom'boa Ervin". ACME: An International Journal for Critical Geographies. 11 (3): 393–412. ISSN 1492-9732.
- Ramnath, Maia (2018). "Non-Western Anarchisms and Postcolonialism". In Adams, Matthew S.; Levy, Carl (eds.). The Palgrave Handbook of Anarchism. London: Palgrave Macmillan. pp. 677–695. doi:10.1007/978-3-319-75620-2_38. ISBN 978-3319756196. S2CID 150357033.
- Williams, Dana M. (October 2015). "Black Panther Radical Factionalization and the Development of Black Anarchism". Journal of Black Studies. 46 (7): 678–703. doi:10.1177/0021934715593053. ISSN 0021-9347. JSTOR 24572914.
