= Twymon Myers =

American member of the Black Liberation Army (1950-1973)

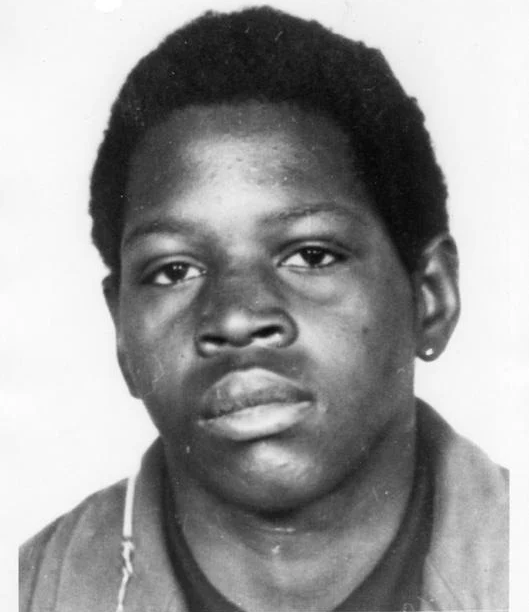

FBI Ten Most Wanted Fugitive
- Charges: Attempted murder; Robbery (2x); Unlawful Flight to Avoid Prosecution

Description
- Born: Twymon Ford Myers; November 27, 1950; New York City, U.S.
- Died: November 14, 1973 (aged 22); New York City, U.S.
- Race: Black
- Gender: Male

Status
- Added: September 28, 1973
- Number: 319
- Killed during capture attempt

Twymon Ford Myers (also spelled Meyers; November 27, 1950 – November 14, 1973) was an American member of the Black Liberation Army (BLA) who was killed in a shootout with police in November 1973. Myers, described as a "leading member" of the BLA, had been placed on the Federal Bureau of Investigation's list of Ten Most Wanted Fugitives in September of that year for his alleged involvement in several robberies. He was also responsible for the 1972 killing of two police officers in New York, and was a suspect in other attacks on law enforcement in the area.

== Biography ==
Twymon Myers was born in the Bronx area of New York City on 27 November 1950.

=== BLA activities ===
Black Liberation Army member Thomas 'Blood' McCreary recruited the twenty-year-old Myers into the BLA in the early 1970s after meeting him in East Village. McCreary claimed that he and Myers were part of a group of BLA members who plotted to carry out an attack against the Rhodesian consulate in New York in support of the Zimbabwe African National Union, but the plan was abandoned after the conspirators saw how well-protected the consulate was. Myers was also implicated in the August 1971 robbery of a social club in New York during which a taxi driver was killed.

On January 27, 1972, NYPD officers Rocco Laurie and Greg Foster were ambushed in East Village by three assailants. The attackers shot the two officers several times before stealing their service weapons and shooting them again. Foster was shot eight times and died at the scene; Laurie died at Bellevue Hospital five hours later. One of the shooters reportedly danced over the bodies of the two officers before fleeing. The car that the killers used to escape was recovered, and fingerprints found inside it were matched to two BLA members: Myers and Ronald Carter. On February 9, Deputy Commissioner Robert Daley publicly identified the two men as being among nine BLA members sought by police, as a rebuttal to claims that the BLA did not exist.

On February 14, two weeks after the murders, Myers, Carter, McCreary and Henry "Sha-Sha" Brown were pulled over by the NYPD for using an invalid license plate while trying to drive to St. Louis. According to McCreary, he tried to defuse the situation while refusing to exit the vehicle, but as he spoke to the officers Myers began tugging on his sleeve, indicating that he wanted to shoot them. When the officer questioning McCreary became hostile and called him a "nigger", Myers shot him in the stomach. Other members of the group exchanged fire with the wounded officer before driving away, but were pursued by two narcotics officers who were in the area for unrelated reasons. During the exchange of fire, Brown accidentally shot and killed Carter. McCreary eventually crashed the car and surrendered to the police. Brown was also captured a few blocks away from the crash, but Myers escaped. The shootout resulted in the search for the killers of Officers Foster and Laurie becoming a priority, as one of the suspects had been using Laurie's stolen gun.

A social club in Brooklyn was robbed by the BLA on December 28, 1972. During Assata Shakur's trial, prosecutors claimed that Myers had been one of the robbers. All charges against Shakur were eventually dismissed.

On January 29, 1973, Myers and five other members of the BLA were named as suspects in the non-fatal shootings of four New York police officers.

=== Manhunt and death ===
A federal arrest warrant was issued for Myers on charges of unlawful interstate flight, attempted murder and robbery on March 3, 1972. New York police were also seeking Myers for questioning in the murders of Laurie and Foster. On July 5, 1973, federal authorities brought a second robbery charge against Myers over his alleged role in a bank robbery that occurred in March 1972. Myers was added to the FBI's list of Ten Most Wanted Fugitives on September 28, 1973; he was the 319th person to be added to the list.

Myers, who the NYPD's Major Crime unit believed to be one of the BLA's leaders, was tracked to several apartments over the following months, but avoided capture by repeatedly changing his address just as law enforcement closed in. Eventually, in November 1973 Myers was tracked to an apartment at 625 Tinton Avenue in the Bronx, which he shared with a woman named Phyllis Pollard. As Myers was believed to be armed, officers decided that it would be easier to arrest him in the street rather than in the apartment.

On November 14 at 7:15 p.m., Myers left the apartment in order to buy groceries, as Pollard had been arrested for robbery earlier that day. Despite wearing a ski cap to obscure his face, Myers was quickly surrounded by a combined force of local police and FBI agents. An NYPD detective approached him and said "police" before removing the cap, at which point Myers produced a 9-mm pistol from his coat and opened fire, wounding two NYPD officers, an uninvolved bystander and an FBI agent named Donald West. All injuries were minor and not life-threatening. Officers then returned fire and shot Myers eight times in the chest. He was taken to hospital but pronounced dead on arrival. A search of Myers' apartment revealed a large array of books about weaponry and military tactics, and the gun used in one of the January attacks on law enforcement.

Following Myers' death, police commissioner Donald Cawley, who had requested that Myers be placed on the Most Wanted list, declared that the NYPD had "culminated a very long journey that involved the final capture of Twymon Myers, who we consider the last of the known leaders of the Black Liberation Army. We believe we have now broken the back of the B.L.A."
