= Muntaqim v. Coombe =

American legal case

- Court: United States Court of Appeals for the Second Circuit
- Full case name: Jalil Abdul Muntaqim, also known as Anthony Bottom, v. Phillip Coombe, Anthony Annucci, and Louis F. Mann
- Argued: March 10, 2003
- Reargued: June 22,2005
- Decided: May 4, 2006
- Citation: 449 F.3d 371

Case history
- Prior history: 366 F.3d 102 (2d Cir. 2004); cert. denied, 543 U.S. 978 (2004).

Court membership
- Judges sitting: John M. Walker Jr., Thomas Joseph Meskill, Richard J. Cardamone, Dennis Jacobs, Guido Calabresi, José A. Cabranes, Chester J. Straub, Rosemary S. Pooler, Robert D. Sack, Sonia Sotomayor, Robert Katzmann, Barrington Daniels Parker Jr., Reena Raggi, Richard C. Wesley, Peter W. Hall

Case opinions
- Per curiam

Muntaqim v. Coombe, 449 F.3d 371 (2d Cir. 2006), was a legal challenge to New York State’s law disenfranchising individuals convicted of felonies while in prison and on parole. The plaintiff, Jalil Abdul Muntaqim, who was serving a life sentence at the time, argued that the law had a disproportionate impact on African Americans and therefore violated Section 2 of the federal Voting Rights Act as a denial of the right to vote on account of race.

== Overview ==
Muntaqim's original name was Anthony Bottom. In May 1971, Muntaqim and an accomplice shot and killed two New York City police officers. In 1974, Muntaqim was convicted on two counts of murder in the first degree for these killings, and received a prison term of twenty-five years to life. Muntaqim was denied parole in 2004 and is eligible to apply again for parole in 2006. Because he is serving a life term, Muntaqim would never again be allowed to vote under New York's existing felon-disenfranchisement law unless he were to be pardoned.

Muntaqim's challenge to New York's felon disenfranchisement law was dismissed by the United States District Court for the Northern District of New York. The United States Court of Appeals affirmed dismissal of the complaint on the grounds that section 2 of the Voting Rights Act does not apply to felon disenfranchisement statutes. This was based on the fact that since the application of Section 2 would have altered the balance of power between the state and federal governments, Congress was obliged, under recent Supreme Court precedent, to make a clear statement that it intended to upset that balance. As it had not done so, the statute could not be applied to disallow felon disenfranchisement.

On November 8, 2004 the Supreme Court denied Muntaqim's petition for certiorari, thus declining to hear the case. After the Supreme Court denied certiorari, the Second Circuit on its own motion ordered rehearing of the case before the full court. The oral argument on rehearing took place on June 22, 2005.

On May 4, 2006 the Second Circuit dismissed Muntaqim's complaint on the grounds that he lacked standing and the court, therefore, lacked jurisdiction to hear him. Muntaqim had been transferred to a NY prison directly from a California prison in which he had been serving a sentence for a different offense. As such, he was then a citizen of California and not of NY. Further, at various parole hearings he had indicated that he had no intention of staying in NY were he to be released. Since, under NY law, serving in prison neither creates nor destroys residency, Muntaqim remained a resident of California and it was that fact, not the felon disenfranchisement law, which prevented Muntaqim from voting.

== Procedural history ==
On September 26, 1994, acting as his own lawyer (pro se), Muntaqim filed a complaint in the United States District Court for the Northern District of New York. This made a number of constitutional and civil rights complaints, among them the Voting Rights Act allegation.

On October 25, 1999, the defendants moved for summary judgment, asking that the complaint be dismissed on the basis of the pleadings (in effect a motion to dismiss or demurrer). This motion was referred to a magistrate judge.

On July 18, 2000, the magistrate judge filed a report and recommendation that defendants' motion be granted and Muntaqim's complaint dismissed in its entirety. Muntaqim objected.

On January 24, 2001, the District Court judge accepted the recommendation and dismissed Muntaqim's complaint. Muntaqim appealed to the United States Court of Appeals for the Second Circuit, but only as to the dismissal of the Voting Rights Act allegation.

On June 4, 2002, the Circuit Court, of its own volition (sua sponte) appointed appellate counsel to assist Muntaqim.

On March 10, 2003 the case was argued before a panel of three judges of the Second Circuit Court of Appeals.

On April 23, 2004, the Circuit Court affirmed the District Court's decision. Muntaqim applied to the US Supreme Court for a writ of certiorari to have it hear his case.

On October 1, 2004, a judge of the Second Circuit Court of Appeals asked that a poll be taken of his or her fellow judges to see if the case should be reheard by all of the judges of the Second Circuit Court of Appeals (rehearing en banc). The poll failed.

On November 8, 2004, the Supreme Court declined to hear Muntaqim's case (writ of certiorari denied).

On December 29, 2004, another poll of the Second Circuit judges was taken, and this time rehearing en banc was granted.

On March 11, 2005, the Circuit Court ordered that Muntaqim's case be consolidated and heard together with a similar case, Hayden v. Pataki.

On June 22, 2005, the case was argued before the en banc panel.

On May 4, 2006, the case was dismissed on the grounds that Muntaqim lacked standing.

== Second Circuit opinion ==
The appeal was heard by Judges Meskill, Cardamone and Cabranes. The unanimous opinion was written by Judge Cabranes.

The court determined that the controlling precedent was what it called the "Supreme Court's 'super-strong clear statement rule'" 366 F.3d 115. Under this doctrine, if Congress intends to alter the balance between federal and state authority, it is required to make an unmistakably clear statement to that effect.

In order to determine if an alteration of that balance has occurred, the court then had to determine what conduct is, in fact, prohibited by Section 1973. The court determined that those provisions were intended to dispense with the requirement that a challenged law be the result of demonstrable racial animus on the legislator's part, but that they still required that there be some causal connection between discrimination and disparity. Since Muntaqim had averred such a connection (and since the procedural posture of the case obliged the court to assume the truth of what he averred), the court determined that he had stated a cognizable VRA claim.

The court then turned to the question of whether Section 1973 affected an alteration in the federal/state balance. The court determined that both punishment of felons and control of the franchise were matters of traditional state concern. The court then determined that, in the absence of findings that disenfranchisement laws were a tool of discrimination or that application of Section 1973 to disenfranchisement laws was a proportionate and congruent response to unconstitutional behavior that application of Section 1973 to felon disenfranchisement laws might well be unconstitutional and, at a minimum, altered the federal/state balance.

Having made that determination, the court determined Congress had not made the clear statement required of it and that Section 1973 did not apply to New York's felon disenfranchisement statute.

== See also ==
- Hayden v. Pataki
