= Bashir Hameed =

Member of Black Panther Party and Black Liberation Army

- Born: James Dixon York; December 1, 1940; Elizabeth, New Jersey, U.S.
- Died: August 30, 2008 (aged 67); Great Meadow Correctional Facility, Comstock, New York, U.S.
- Other name: Bashir Hameed
- Known for: Member of Black Panther Party and Black Liberation Army
- Criminal charges: Murder and Attempted Murder
- Penalty: 33 years to Life

Bashir Hameed (born James Dixon York on December 1, 1940; died August 30, 2008) was a member of the Black Panther Party and the Black Liberation Army.

York was born December 1, 1940, in Elizabeth, New Jersey. It was in 1968 while living in Oakland, California that York joined the Black Panther Party. He returned to New Jersey in 1969 to reorganize the Jersey City Branch of the BPP as deputy chairman.

In 1974 York was serving a two-to-three-year sentence at Trenton State Prison for assaulting a police officer when he escaped during a furlough to visit a sick relative. He was later recaptured and served out the remainder of that sentence.

== 1981 Murder of John Scarangella ==
Police Officer Richard Rainey and his partner, Officer John Scarangella, were responding to a burglary in St. Albans, Queens, New York City on May 1, 1981, when they pulled over two men in a white van. The two men inside the van were York and a fellow Black Liberation Army member Anthony LaBorde (later known as Abdul Majid). Upon being stopped, York and LaBorder exited the van and opened fire on the officers with semi-automatic handguns. John Scarangella was shot thirteen times including twice in the head in the exchange, later dying of his injuries while Rainey was shot eight times in the leg and back and was later left on disability for the rest of his life.

The case went before multiple trials. The first trial ended in a hung jury, who were divided along racial lines. The second trial was declared a mistrial by the judge after the judge ordered the jury to reach a verdict by a deadline, but subsequently one of the jurors fell ill. Both York and LaBorde were convicted of murder and sentenced to 33 years to life as a result of a third trial.

After their 1981 arrest both York and LaBorde converted to Islam and assumed new Muslim names, LaBorde doing so in 1982.

Hameed died while serving this sentence at the Great Meadow Correctional Facility in Comstock, New York.
