= Geraldine Robinson =

American activist and political prisoner (born 1943)

Geraldine Pointer
- Born: Geraldine Robinson; November 20, 1943 (age 82); Columbus, Ohio, U.S.
- Employer: The Afro-Asian Bookshop
- Known for: Civil rights activism, being falsely imprisoned in Buffalo New York
- Movement: Black Power, Black Nationalism
- Criminal charges: sale of a narcotics, interfering with an arrest (1968)
- Criminal penalty: 7 to 15 years imprisonment (2½ years served)
- Criminal status: petition to vacate sentence pending
- Children: 5; James, Terrance, Exzertios, Jamie, and Christa

Geraldine Pointer (born Geraldine Robinson, on November 20, 1943) is an American activist from Buffalo, New York, known for being a political prisoner in the Black Power movement and her role in the prisoners' rights movement. In 1968, she was a manager at the Afro-Asian Bookshop on Jefferson Avenue where Robinson was arrested along with owner Martin Sostre during a raid by plainclothes police officers and FBI agents. She was charged with sale of narcotics and interfering with arrest, convicted by an all-white jury, and sentenced 7 to 15 years in prison. Robinson served 2½ years in prison before being released and efforts continue to today to have her sentence vacated.

== Early life ==
Geraldine Robinson was born in Columbus, Ohio, on November 27, 1943. Robinson was one of seven children and moved with her mother to Buffalo when she was young. Robinson’s mother worked at the Bethlehem Steel plant. They first lived in Willert Park Homes which was the city’s first public housing complex built for Black residents. They later bought a home on East Utica Street in the Cold Spring neighborhood.

In her early twenties Robinson was living in an apartment on Celtic Place in Buffalo. She was the mother of five children James, Terrance, Exzertios, Jamie, and Christa.

== Path to activism ==
Robinson later managed Sostre’s East-West Bookshop at 289 High Street, which specialized in records. Robinson met Martin Sostre when she was 23 years old around the time he opened the Afro-Asian Bookshop on Jefferson Avenue in 1966. The two then began dating. She began working with Sostre because he was well known in Buffalo for his radical activism and his vision of empowering the community through literature. Sostre opened two additional locations, including the East-West Bookshop at 289 High Street. Robinson would then regularly help manage Sostre’s High Street store.

Robinson later recalled that she "wasn’t an activist at first, but that her political commitment deepened through her experiences around the bookstore and its clashes with authorities."

== Bookstore raid ==
In 1967, Buffalo became a hot spot of black power uprisings during the "Long Hot Summer of '67." Sostre's bookstores were central hubs of political thought for young Black Buffalonians amid the uprisings. The state and local police along with the FBI were surveilling Sostre and the store and cultivating informants. Reports say that a young acquaintance of Sostre, Arto Williams was arrested on a minor charge, approached by police in jail and then cooperated in supplying information about Sostre.

A raid on the Afro-Asian Bookshop took place in the night of July 14, 1967 where Sostre and Robinson were closing the store. Resulting in the arrest of both Geraldine Robinson and Martin Sostre. The arrest allegedly involved a scuffle where the officers beat up Sostre and pushed around Robinson. According to a witness, the officer had a blackjack in his hand but its unclear whether or not it was used to beat Sostre.

The police and court account is that Arto Williams, after being given marked bills, bought $15 bag of heroin from Sostre and the police allegedly recovered the marked bills during the raid. The case was built on the account that it was a "controlled buy."

The defense and re-evaluated account is that the "controlled buy" was entirely fabricated. Witnesses and investigations report that the heroin was planted and that the testimony from Williams was coerced. Years after, Williams recanted, stating that the police pressured him to make the testimony and that no sale had taken place. Critics of the official record also point to the fact that Sostre was not a drug dealer in the community and that no corroborating physical evidence was ever shown.

Martin Sostre later described the raid in a letter sent from prison in July 1969, "they made their Gestapo-like raid on the bookshop, beat me up, pushed Geraldine around, framed us with the sale of narcotics, wrecked the bookshop and stole everything of value."

The raid is understood to be part of COINTELPRO, the FBI’s covert counterintelligence program which targeted Black radical organizations and activists.

== Trial and conviction ==
At a session with Judge Frederick to assign a lawyer, Robinson said that her co-defendant Martin Sostre, who had become a jailhouse lawyer, would defend her. Then, at her first court date on Dec. 18, 1967, Robinson announced she would be defending herself in court. Robinson said that, "I don’t think I’ll get a fair trial with a public defender, that’s why I don’t want one." The judge denied her attorney’s motion to appeal the $10,000 bail. The moment before she was led out of the court room she said, “Don’t waste any tears, and please take care of my children. Continue the struggle!”

A few weeks later, student organizers at the University at Buffalo protested to demand their release and raised $5,000 for bail allowing her to return home. Robinson joined other defense committee members in protesting in front of the Erie County Courthouse for Sostre's release.

Robinson's trial lasted six weeks beginning in May 1969 with Attorney Charles McKinney defending her. On May 27th, Robinson took the stand to testify. There were many inconsistencies in the state's version of events. Robinson claimed that she was never told that she was under arrest, denied ever seeing Arto Williams, and denied ever having sold heroin. When being cross examined Geraldine refuted the claim made by State Trooper Sterverson that he went to high school with her, but she refuted, saying she went to an all-girls high school. The state also could never produce the serial numbers of the dollar bills used in the alleged drug sale claiming they were destroyed. Similarly in Martin Sostre's trial, according to a 2024 article in Minnesota Journal of Law & Inequality, "Several facts were uncovered during and after the trial which indicate that Martin Sostre was framed." For example, one piece of faulty evidence provided by the state was "a conveniently ‘missing’ motion picture film that was allegedly taken through a window that turned out to be boarded up at the time," regarding when the police claimed they had photographs of a heroin purchase in the store. Later, the cross-examiner asked Geraldine, "You don't like policemen, do you?" to which she replied, "Are you supposed to love them?"

Robinson was convicted by an all-white jury and sentenced to 7 to 15 years in prison. During her time incarcerated time, she lost custody of her children.

== Life after prison ==
Robinson spent a total of 2 years and 19 days incarcerated. She successfully defended herself in family court and was reunited with her children. She later recalled that being separated from her children was the most difficult part.

In recent years, advocacy in the Buffalo community seeks a full exoneration of Robinson and Sostre.

Geraldine married and took the surname Pointer.

== See also ==
- Martin Sostre
- COINTELPRO
- Black Liberation
- Prison Abolition
