= George Jackson Brigade =

Revolutionary group based in Seattle, Washington (1975–1978)

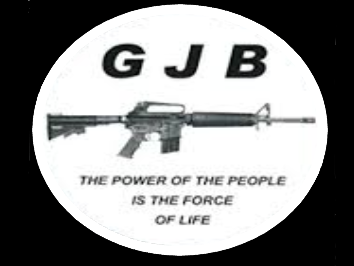
- Logo used by the George Jackson Brigade
- Leader: Horizontal leadership
- Dates active: May 31, 1975 – 1978
- Headquarters: Seattle, Washington
- Active regions: Seattle, Tacoma, and Bellevue, Washington; Portland, Oregon
- Ideology: Libertarian socialism; Anti-war activism; Anarcho-communism; Antisexism; Anti-imperialism; Queer socialism; Marxism-Leninism
- Size: At least 6
- Wars: Black Power movement; Prison abolition

The George Jackson Brigade, or GJB, was a militant group founded in the mid-1970s, based in Seattle, Washington, and named after George Jackson, a dissident prisoner and Black Panther member shot and killed during an escape attempt at San Quentin Prison in 1971. The group combined veterans of the women's liberation movement, LGBTQ activists, and Black prisoners.

The organization was ideologically diverse, consisting of both communists and anarchists. It engaged in a number of bombings and other revolutionary attacks on governmental and business sites, as well as bank robberies over the years from 1975 through 1977. The group broke up with the death or imprisonment of many of its members by 1978.

== Formation ==
In 1974, Ed Mead traveled to San Francisco, just a few years after his release from prison for a pharmacy burglary, hoping to connect with the Symbionese Liberation Army. However, when he arrived there he joined with another group, the New World Liberation Front (NWLF), where he learned to make pipe bombs.

Ed returned to Seattle, where he went underground to begin the armed struggle. He was joined soon after by his friend Bruce Seidel. They named the group after George Jackson, based on his promise that he would haunt his oppressors after his death.

== Ideology and activities ==
The George Jackson Brigade included a mixture of communist and anarchist ideologies. It was involved in violent acts and advocated the use of force to overthrow the United States government or the government of the State of Washington, trying to initiate a popular insurrection and to draw attention to conditions for prisoners at Walla Walla State Penitentiary and an old federal prison on McNeil Island.

The main goal of the George Jackson Brigade was the dismantling of the United States government, to be replaced with a collectivist form of leadership. As communists and anarchists made up the brigade, the ideas for the exact way this would be achieved were not uniform.

The George Jackson Brigade stated that the ruling class would meet any revolution with violence so they must be prepared to use violence themselves. After each attack they carried out, successful or unsuccessful they would send a communique explaining why each place had been attacked. They also used these communiques as a way to communicate with authorities. In its operations, it tried to avoid killing or injuring civilians at all costs. In various communiques, the group claimed credit for bank robberies, bombings, attacks against custom houses, court houses, Safeway stores, public utilities, and correctional facilities.

Their second attack, at 9:30pm on September 18th at the Safeway grocery store on Capitol Hill in Seattle, was also their first failure as a group. The group hid a pipe bomb in a 50-pound bag of dog food, which it left in the store. Ed Mead said that he then called the Safeway store and informed them there was a bomb, but his warning was dismissed as a prank; the Seattle press reported that he called the wrong number. The explosion injured a number of civilians, engendering criticism for the attack. This was the second bombing of the week at the Safeway at 1410 E John; on September 15th, a local leftist affiliated with the United Farm Workers, Ralph “Po” Ford, was placing another bomb in front of the store, when it exploded and killed him. The George Jackson Brigade's bombing on the 18th was an "act of love and solidarity" to finish what Po had attempted, and in retaliation for the capture of four Symbionese Liberation Army members including Patty Hearst.

== Members ==
Prominent members of the George Jackson Brigade included:

- Ed Mead, who was from California. He was arrested on January 23, 1976, after an attempted bank robbery in Tukwila, Washington. Mead was held at Walla Walla Penitentiary (now Washington State Penitentiary) until his release in 1993. While in prison, Mead organized Men Against Sexism, which organized LGBTQ men and men of color within the prison to dismantle rape culture there.
- John Sherman, who was from New Jersey. He met Mead while they were in federal prison at McNeil Island in the late 1960s. He was injured in the Tukwila bank robbery, then later freed from custody by Mark Cook. Sherman remained free for two years before his recapture. Sherman later escaped again from a federal prison in California. He was finally released in 1998.
- Bruce Seidel, who was a good friend of Mead and graduate student in economics at the University of Illinois. He was killed during the Tukwila bank robbery.
- Mark Cook, who was the organizer of the annual CONvention conference of prison activists. He was the only known African-American member of the Brigade and the last to join. He took part in the Tukwila robbery, avoiding arrest, but was later arrested a few days after later freeing Sherman from Harborview Medical Center, wounding a King County Deputy, Virgil Johnson, in the encounter. He spent the next 24 years in Washington State Penitentiary, the longest of any of the brigadiers. While in prison, he started a chapter of the Black Panthers, organized an annual seminar for people working in or impacted by the justice system to talk about issues with the system, and launched the PIVOT program, which helped former prisoners find work. Cook was released in 2000.
- Rita "Bo" Brown, a working-class butch lesbian from Klamath Falls in Southern Oregon. A former prisoner herself, she was active in the Seattle prisoner support community. She was known as the "Gentleman Bank Robber" because she dressed in suits and spoke politely to bank staff during robberies. She was imprisoned for 8 years for her activities with the Brigade, and was released in 1987. Once released, she continued her work in prison advocacy, joining groups such as Critical Resistance. She died in 2021 from complications of dementia.
- Therese Coupez, who was Rita Brown's girlfriend from the local area. She was also imprisoned for her activities with the Brigade. After her release in 1999, she produced Creating a Movement With Teeth, a documentary about the brigade.

== Actions ==
Date	Location	Area	Notes
Attacks conducted by the group
31 May 1975	Washington State Corrections Office	Olympia, Washington	
11 June 1975	University of Washington		
5 September 1975	FBI offices	Tacoma, Washington	
6 September 1975	Bureau of Indian Affairs Office	Everett, Washington	
13 September 1975	Federal Office Building	Seattle, Washington	
18 September 1975	Safeway Store	Seattle, Washington	
31 December 1975	Safeway Office building	Bellevue, Washington	
31 December 1975	Seattle City Light Laurelhurst Substation	Seattle, Washington	
12 May 1977	Rainier National Bank	Redmond, Washington	
12 May 1977	Rainier National Bank	Bellevue, Washington	attempted
3 July 1977	Puget Power substation	Olympia, Washington	attempted
6 October 1977	Westlund Buick	Seattle, Washington	attempted
13 October 1977	S. L. Savidge Dodge	Seattle, Washington	
16 October 1977	B.B.C Dodge	Burien, Washington	
1 November 1977	Phil Smart Mercedes	Bellevue, Washington	
2 November 1977	Diebold, INC.	Seattle, Washington	
23 December 1977	Power Substation	Renton, Washington	
Robberies conducted by the group
23 January 1976	Pacific National Bank	Tukwila, Washington	Attempted robbery and shootout by Mead, Sherman, Seidel, and Cook. Mead was captured, Sherman was wounded in the jaw, Seidel was killed, and Cook was able to flee in a car.
8 June 1976	Western Bank	Coos Bay, Oregon	
13 July 1976	Carter National Bank	Ashland, Oregon	
1 August 1976	The Oregon Bank	Medford, Oregon	
28 October 1976	First State Bank of Oregon	Portland, Oregon	
4 January 1977	U.S. National Bank of Oregon	Portland, Oregon	
7 February 1977	U.S. National Bank of Oregon	Wilsonville, Oregon	
21 May 1977	Washington State Liquor Store	Bellevue, Washington	
20 June 1977	Rainier National Bank	Bellevue, Washington	
8 September 1977	Old National Bank	Kirkland, Washington	
19 September 1977	Peoples National Bank	Seattle, Washington	Skyway Branch

== Downfall ==
The downfall of the George Jackson Brigade started on January 23, 1976, when they attempted to rob a bank in Tukwila, Washington. Two police officers and one member of the George Jackson Brigade, Bruce Seidel, were killed along with Sherman and Mead being arrested with Sherman also being wounded. Then, on March 10 of the same year, Mark Cook rescued John Sherman from police custody; however, he shot a police officer in the stomach in the process. Sherman and Cook both escaped but Cook was captured a few days later and spent the next 25 years in prison.

The remaining members retreated to regroup. The group came back in the Fall of 1977, however in September 1977 Brown was arrested while casing a bank. Then on March 21, 1978, Sherman, Coupez, and Brown's girlfriend, Janine Bertram, were arrested in a Tacoma restaurant right before executing another robbery.

According to a report published by the National Consortium for the Study of Terrorism and Responses to Terrorism for the United States Department of Homeland Security's DHS Science and Technology Directorate, the George Jackson Brigade was ranked fifteenth among terrorist groups that perpetrated the most terrorist attacks in the United States between 1970 and 2011.

== See also ==
- Angola Three
- Black Panther Party
- Black Revolutionary Assault Team
- Not Fucking Around Coalition
- List of military units named after people
- Seattle Liberation Front

== Sources ==
- What Is the George Jackson Brigade? George Jackson Brigade Information Project (online)
- Mark Cook, Seattle Black Panther Party History and Memory Project University of Washington (website)
- Terrorist Incidents Attributed to the George Jackson Brigade in the Global Terrorism Database http://www.start-dev.umd.edu/gtd/search/Results.aspx?chart=overtime&search=George%20Jackson
