= Ashanti Alston =

American anarchist activist (born 1954)

- Alston speaking in 2026
- Born: Ashanti Alston Omowali; 1954; Plainfield, New Jersey, U.S.
- Organization(s): Black Panther Party; Black Liberation Army
- Movement: Black nationalism, Black Liberation, Black anarchism
- Spouse: Safiya Bukhari (m. 1984)

Ashanti Omowali Alston (born 1954) is an anarchist activist, speaker, and writer, and former member of the Black Panther Party and Black Liberation Army. From 1974 to 1985, he spent time in prison for bank robbery, which caused him to become further engaged in politics. He is currently on the Steering Committee of the Jericho Movement to free U.S. political prisoners. Alston resides in Providence, Rhode Island.

== Early life ==
Alston grew up in the inner city of Plainfield, New Jersey, which he described as being, at that time, "Niggertown with all the customs and traditions of racism, sexism and powerlessness". Alston was 11 years old during the assassination of Malcolm X and 13 years old during the 1967 Newark riots, events that both took place near his hometown of Plainfield. In a 2010 interview, Alston said that he did not remember Malcolm X's death in 1965, but he began to understand the significance of Malcolm's legacy as rebellions occurred throughout the United States in 1967. Alston described seeing his older brother's copy of Malcolm X's autobiography with the subtitle "Former pimp, hustler, robber, who becomes leader of the Black Revolution", which demonstrated to him that "people that come from that kind of background can play a heroic role in the struggle." He recalled that witnessing the 1967 Plainfield rebellion gave him "an image of black men and women in heroic roles in our community crashing all the myths about us being 'niggers', all that stuff."

Malcolm X's assassination and the Newark riots influenced Alston's decision to join the Black Panther Party at age 17, as he believed that the Panthers were "taking Malcolm's teachings to the next level". At this time, Alston attended Nation of Islam meetings despite not being a member. He felt a strong disdain for white people, as preached by the Nation of Islam; however, upon joining the Panthers, he changed his views.

== Black Panther Party, Black Liberation Army, and prison ==
In 1971, in the face of the Panther 21 trial, which saw several of his peers possibly facing the death penalty, Alston joined the Black Liberation Army (BLA), a spin-off group from the Panthers that advocated for and attempted armed struggle against the United States government. In 1974, he was arrested and imprisoned for 11 years for taking part in a robbery intended to raise funds for the BLA. Alston credits his time in prison with helping him to learn about political movements, economic theories, political organizations, religion, and guerrilla theories. During this time, he became an anarchist, in contrast to the Marxism-Leninism and Maoism explored by the Black Panther Party. While imprisoned, Alston also became disillusioned with the BLA, particularly due to its endorsement of drugs, as he understood the intention of the BLA to be the liberation of Black communities from the tyranny and influence of drugs at the time.

Alston observed much sexism during his time in the Black Panther Party, despite the group's stated intention of gender equality, which he didn't fully realize until his stint in prison. However, he has acknowledged that some women still felt empowered by the Black Panther Party to fight sexism despite experiencing it within the party, recalling, "Sisters would tell you that because everybody had guns there were certain ways that they could tell a brother, 'you're not going to fuck with me, I'm not going to be your sexual object because I got a gun'."

== Personal life ==
In 1984, Alston married fellow BPP and BLA member Safiya Bukhari. She died in 2003.
