= Hayden v. Pataki =

American legal case

- Court: United States Court of Appeals for the Second Circuit
- Full case name: Joseph Hayden, et al. v. George Pataki, Governor of the State of New York, et al.
- Argued: June 22, 2005
- Decided: May 4, 2006
- Citation: 449 F.3d 305

Case history
- Prior history: Hayden v. Pataki, No. 00-CV-8586(LMM), 2004 WL 1335921 (S.D.N.Y. June 14, 2004), consolidated with Muntaqim v. Coombe, 366 F.3d 102, as amended, 396 F.3d 95 (2004)

Court membership
- Judges sitting: John M. Walker Jr., Dennis Jacobs, Guido Calabresi, José A. Cabranes, Chester J. Straub, Rosemary S. Pooler, Robert D. Sack, Sonia Sotomayor, Robert Katzmann, Barrington Daniels Parker Jr., Reena Raggi, Richard C. Wesley, Peter W. Hall(en banc)

Case opinions
- Majority: Cabranes, joined by Walker, Wesley, Hall
- Concurrence: Walker, joined by Jacobs
- Concurrence: Jacobs
- Concur/dissent: Straub, joined by Sack
- Concur/dissent: Sack, joined by Straub
- Concur/dissent: Raggi, joined by Jacobs
- Dissent: Parker, joined by Calabresi, Pooler, Sotomayor
- Dissent: Calabresi
- Dissent: Sotomayor
- Dissent: Katzmann

Hayden v. Pataki, 449 F.3d 305 (2nd Cir. 2006), was a legal challenge to New York State's law disenfranchising individuals convicted of felonies while in prison and on parole. New York State is one of the 47 states to prohibit citizens from voting while in prison.

The initial pro se complaint was filed in the U.S. District Court for the Southern District of New York, by Joseph Hayden on September 12, 2003.

The plaintiff, Joseph Hayden, a former incarcerated felon and Campaign Director at nonprofit Unlock the Block, argues that because the law has a disproportionate impact on African Americans it violates Section 2 of the federal Voting Rights Act as a denial of the right to vote on account of race, in addition to violating the First, Fourteenth, and Fifteenth Amendments. The U.S. District Court dismissed the case as not violating Section 2 of the Voting Rights Act, nor of violating any of the Constitutional Amendments.

In an en banc rehearing of a panel decision, the Second Circuit held that the law did not violate the Voting Rights Act.

New York State later restored voting rights to people on parole, first by executive order in 2018, and then by law in 2021. However, people in prison are still unable to exercise the right to vote in New York.

== See also ==
- Felony disenfranchisement in the United States
- Disfranchisement after the Reconstruction era
- Muntaqim v. Coombe
