= Leesburg, New Jersey =

Populated place in Cumberland County, New Jersey, US

- Census-designated place
- Location in Cumberland County Location in New Jersey Location in the United States
- Coordinates: 39°15′24″N 74°59′15″W
- Country: United States
- State: New Jersey
- County: Cumberland
- Township: Maurice River

Area
  - Total: 1.97 sq mi (5.10 km^{2})
  - Land: 1.76 sq mi (4.56 km^{2})
  - Water: 0.21 sq mi (0.54 km^{2})
- Elevation: 16 ft (5 m)

Population (2020)
  - Total: 601
  - Density: 341.4/sq mi (131.83/km^{2})
- ZIP Code: 08327
- FIPS code: 34-39870
- GNIS feature ID: 0877730

Leesburg is an unincorporated community and census-designated place (CDP) located within Maurice River Township in Cumberland County, in the U.S. state of New Jersey. The area is served as United States Postal Service ZIP Code 08327. As of the 2020 census, Leesburg had a population of 601.

The land that later became the town of Leesburg in the late eighteenth century also was surveyed by John Worledge and John Budd in 1691. Similar to Dorchester, the first settlers to the area were most likely Swedish, though a town was not established until 1795 when John Lee, an Egg Harbor shipwright, founded Leesburg. In doing so, he and his brothers opened the first shipyard—and with it established the industrial destiny of constructing coastal vessels. In 1850 James Ward built a marine railway here to facilitate the repair of larger ships, which were attracted to Maurice River site because it was only six miles from the Delaware Bay.

Though Leesburg's economic base was primarily shipbuilding, two successful early twentieth-century industries were the Leesburg Packing Company, a cannery that seasonally employed 100 persons, and J. C. Fifield and Son, a fertilizer works. Today the only evidence of these industries is WHIBCO Inc., a sandmining company whose administrative offices occupy the buildings of the former Del Bay Shipyard

Bayside State Prison is located in Leesburg. In 1988 the prison was renamed from "Leesburg State Prison," though some Leesburg residents stated dissatisfaction with the renaming since it was the only widely known aspect of the Leesburg community.

== Demographics ==
Historical population
Census	Pop.	Note	%±
2020	601		—
U.S. Decennial Census

Leesburg was first listed as a census designated place in the 2020 U.S. census.

Leesburg CDP, New Jersey – Racial and ethnic composition Note: the US Census treats Hispanic/Latino as an ethnic category. This table excludes Latinos from the racial categories and assigns them to a separate category. Hispanics/Latinos may be of any race.
Race / Ethnicity (NH = Non-Hispanic)	Pop 2020	2020
White alone (NH)	529	88.02%
Black or African American alone (NH)	19	3.16%
Native American or Alaska Native alone (NH)	0	0.00%
Asian alone (NH)	0	0.00%
Native Hawaiian or Pacific Islander alone (NH)	0	0.00%
Other race alone (NH)	0	0.00%
Mixed race or Multiracial (NH)	17	2.83%
Hispanic or Latino (any race)	36	5.99%
Total	601	100.00%

As of 2020, the population was 601.

== Education ==
Students are zoned to Maurice River Township School District.

== Notable people ==
People who were born in, residents of, or otherwise closely associated with Leesburg include:

- Thomas Lee (1780–1856), represented New Jersey at large in the United States House of Representatives from 1833 to 1837.
