= Lorenzo Kom'boa Ervin =

American writer, activist, and Black anarchist (born 1947)

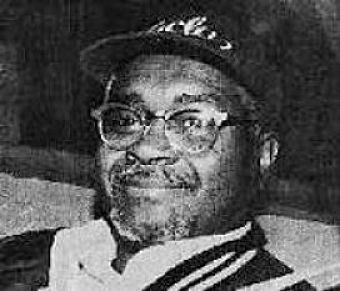
- Born: March 30, 1947 (age 79); Chattanooga, Tennessee, U.S.
- Occupations: Activist; Writer
- Notable work: Anarchism and the Black Revolution
- Political party: Black Panther Party
- Movement: Black Power Movement; Anarchist movement
- Spouse: JoNina Abron-Ervin
- Military Career
- Allegiance: United States
- Branch: U.S. Army

Lorenzo Kom'boa Ervin (born March 30, 1947) is an American writer, activist, and Black anarchist. He is a former member of the Black Panther Party and Concerned Citizens for Justice. He was born in Chattanooga, Tennessee, and has lived in Memphis, Tennessee, since 2010.

== Youth and early activism ==
Ervin was born Lorenzo Edward Ervin Jr., on March 30, 1947. He joined the NAACP youth group when he was 12 and participated in the sit-in protests that helped end racial segregation in Chattanooga. He was drafted during the Vietnam War and served in the army for two years, beginning in Mannheim West Germany, where he formed a group called Black GIs United to address racism within the U.S. Army. Developing an anti-war stance, he took place in anti-Vietnam demonstrations with West German students, and encouraged GIs who were being sent to Vietnam to desert in protest. Shortly after, Komboa himself was drafted to go to Vietnam and chose to go AWOL. After being captured, kicked out of the army and sent home.

In 1967 he joined the Student Nonviolent Coordinating Committee and, a short time later, the Black Panther Party.

== Hijacking and incarceration ==
In February 1969, Ervin hijacked a plane to Cuba to evade prosecution for allegedly trying to kill a Ku Klux Klan leader. While in Cuba, and then Czechoslovakia, Ervin became disillusioned with state socialism. After the US government was unable to obtain his extradition, Ervin was turned over to U.S. authorities by Cuba, and he was arrested upon being returned to the U.S. in September 1969. Ervin was charged with two counts of airline hijacking in the US District Court for the State of Georgia. A jury convicted Ervin of both counts, for which presiding Federal District Judge Albert Henderson imposed a sentence of life imprisonment, after the jury declined to recommend the death sentence sought by the prosecutor. Ervin was the first person to receive a life sentence for an aircraft hijacking under U.S. law. Previously, the most severe sentence imposed for the offense had been 25 years imprisonment.

Ervin first learned about anarchism while in prison in the late 1970s. He read numerous anarchist books, and his case was adopted by the Anarchist Black Cross, a political prisoner support organization. While in prison, Ervin authored several anarchist pamphlets, including the book Anarchism and the Black Revolution, which has been reprinted many times (most recently in 2021 by Pluto Press) and is considered his best-known work.

Eventually, Ervin's legal challenges and an international campaign led to his release from prison after 15 years.

== Post-prison activism ==
After his release, Ervin returned to Chattanooga, where he became involved with a local civil rights group called Concerned Citizens for Justice, fighting police brutality and the Klan. In 1987, Ervin helped file a class action civil rights lawsuit that resulted in the restructuring of the Chattanooga government and the election of several Black city council members.

On April 26, 2008, Ervin and his wife, JoNina Abron-Ervin organized a march and rally in Nashville, Tennessee, to protest the deaths of two youths in Tennessee facilities at the Chad Youth Enhancement Center, and the deaths of a number of prisoners at the Nashville Detention Center, allegedly by guards at that facility.

On June 12, 2012, Ervin and other Black activists held a conference called "Let's Organize the Hood", and there created the Memphis Black Autonomy Federation to fight the high levels of unemployment and poverty in African American communities, rampant police brutality, including the unjustified use of deadly force, and the mass imprisonment of Black people and other peoples of color by the United States government through its war on drugs, which Ervin and other activists claim are unjustly directed to Black/POC communities.

== Australian speaking tour ==
During July 1997, Lorenzo Kom'boa Ervin was invited to tour Australia by local anarchist organization "Angry People". The far-right organization Australians Against Further Immigration raised the issue with Acting Immigration Minister Amanda Vanstone. Then anti-immigration politician Pauline Hanson accused him of being "a known terrorist and gun-runner".

Prime Minister John Howard was reported as horrified to learn that Mr. Lorenzo Kom'Boa Ervin had been granted a visa and was visiting Australia. Immigration officials started an urgent investigation, detaining Ervin in Brisbane and cancelling his visa. The visa was cancelled on the grounds that he was not of good character, which Ervin disputed.

Ervin had visited twenty countries on lecture tours since his release from prison in 1983. Ervin's 1997 Australian visa had been granted through an electronic lodgment system in Los Angeles. The imprisonment of Ervin was taken to the High Court of Australia, where Chief Justice Sir Gerard Brennan restored Ervin's visa and ordered his release from prison, saying that Ervin did not appear to have been accorded natural justice, as well as chiding the Government's lawyers for suggesting he had no power to hear the case.

The Federal Government agreed to pay Ervin's legal costs. Ervin stated that Mr. Howard should apologize.

The detainment of Ervin stimulated international protests that included pickets of Australian embassies and consulates in South Africa, Greece, Italy, Sweden, UK, Ireland, New Zealand and the US.

Immediately after his release from four days in prison, Ervin attended NAIDOC celebrations in Musgrave Park, West End, as a guest of the Murri people (Indigenous Australians from Queensland), and gave a brief speech. Ervin continued his speaking tour, while Immigration officials prepared further questions for him to answer. While travelling on his speaking tour Ervin attempted to visit Australian Black Panther movement activist Denis Walker in Cessnock Jail but was denied access by police and warders.

The actions of the government were generally said to have generated attention and publicity for Ervin and to have resulted in many more people attending his speaking tour than would have otherwise.

The affair resulted in Immigration Minister Philip Ruddock cutting short an overseas trip to oversee further Immigration handling of the issue. Ervin left Australia on July 24, 1997, claiming that Immigration officials had threatened to deport him if he stayed any longer. Soon after Ruddock announced an upgrade of Australia's migrant alert systems and toughened its visa screening procedures, with more stringent checking of "high-risk" applicants.
