= Elizabeth Ann Duke =

American radical activist and long-term fugitive

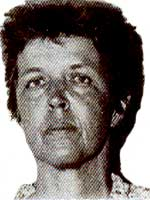
- Photograph of Elizabeth Ann Duke, taken in 1985
- Born: November 25, 1940 (age 85); Beeville, Texas, U.S.
- Other names: Betty Ann Duke, Elizabeth Ann Duke, Betty Weir, "Betty Ann"
- Occupation: Teacher
- Status: At large
- Capture status: Fugitive
- Wanted by: FBI
- Wanted since: October 1985

Elizabeth Ann Duke (born November 25, 1940) is an American fugitive best known for her involvement with radical left-wing political organizations and subsequent flight from prosecution. She remains wanted by the Federal Bureau of Investigation on charges related to bombings, including the 1983 U.S. Senate bombing, carried out by the May 19th Communist Organization.

== Early life ==
Duke was born in Beeville, Texas, on November 25, 1940, but has given her date of birth as April 20, 1941. Duke was allegedly a member of a Weathermen splinter group, the May 19th Communist Organization. The group claimed responsibility for a series of bombings of U.S. government buildings between 1983 and 1985, including the bombing of the United States Capitol building in November 1983.

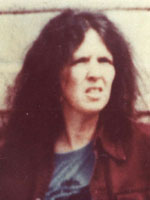
Photograph of Elizabeth Ann Duke, taken during the 1970s

== Arrest and flight ==
Duke and Alan Berkman were arrested in May 1985 and indicted on conspiracy, falsification and weapons charges by a federal grand jury, in what became known as the Resistance Conspiracy case. Also charged as co-conspirators were Marilyn Jean Buck (wanted for her role in the 1981 Brinks armored car robbery), Laura Whitehorn, Linda Sue Evans, Susan Rosenberg, and Timothy Blunk. Duke was released on bail in July 1985 and went missing the following October.

The Federal Bureau of Investigation is offering a reward of up to $100,000 for information leading directly to the arrest and conviction of Duke.

== See also ==
- List of fugitives from justice who disappeared
