= Laura Whitehorn =

American activist and convicted bomber

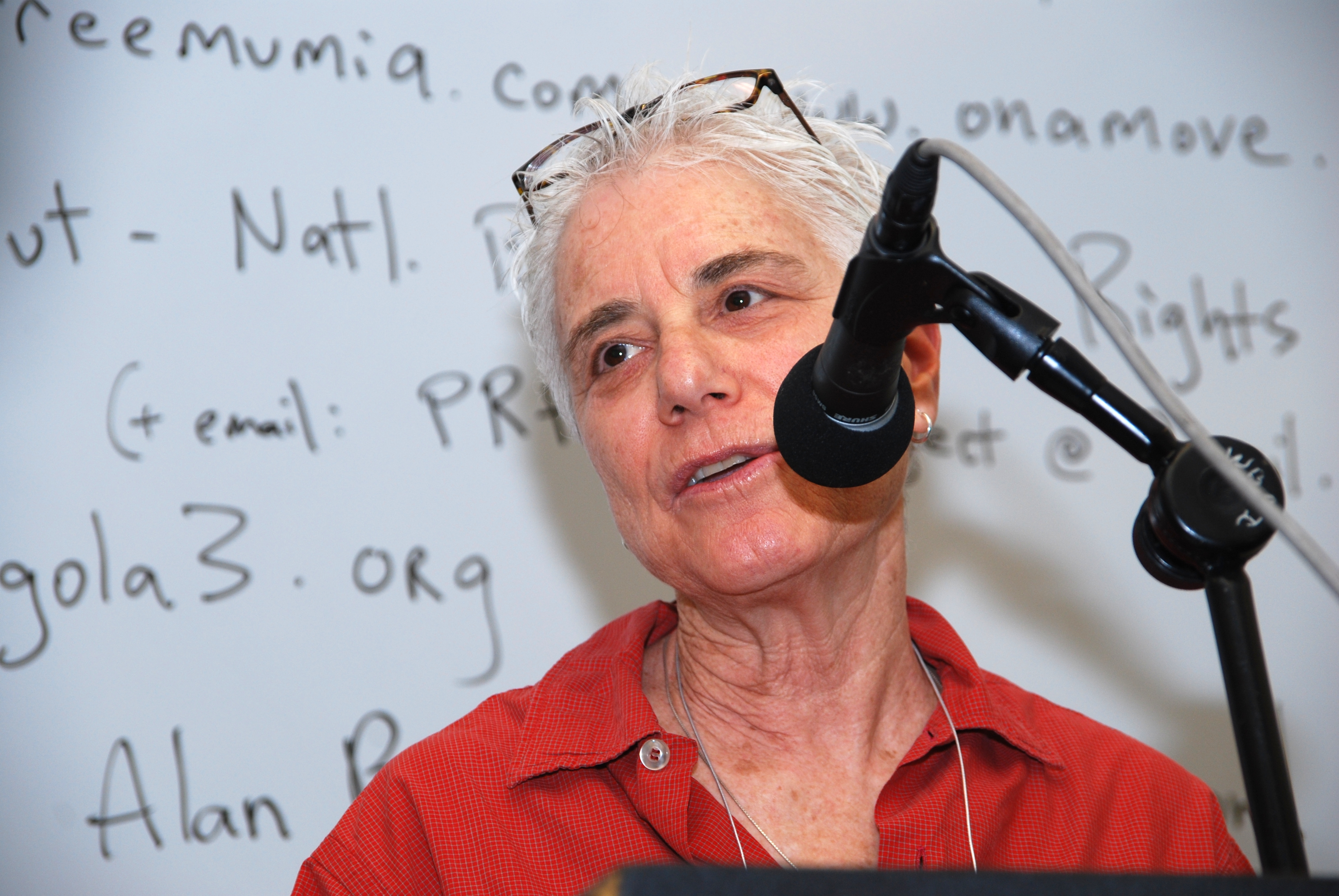
- Laura Whitehorn in 2009
- Born: Laura Jane Whitehorn; April 1945; Brooklyn, New York, USA
- Education: Radcliffe College Class of 1966 Brandeis University
- Occupations: Senior Editor, POZ Magazine; guest speaker on college campuses
- Parent(s): Lenore and Nathaniel Whitehorn
- Status: Released
- Criminal charges: Conspiracy; destruction of government property; fraud
- Penalty: 20 years in prison

Laura Jane Whitehorn (born April 1945) is an American activist who participated in the 1983 United States Senate bombing and was imprisoned for 14 years in federal prison. In the 1960s, she organized and participated in civil rights and anti-war movements.

== Early life ==
Whitehorn was born in Brooklyn, New York in 1945. She graduated from Radcliffe College in 1966 and later earned a master’s degree from Brandeis University. In 1968, she moved to Chicago to pursue a PhD in English literature. After working as an organizer for Students for a Democratic Society (SDS), Whitehorn became a member of the Weather Underground in 1969. She traveled with them to Havana, Cuba, as part of the organization's instruction on Marxism and urban warfare, visiting one of the camps established by Soviet KGB colonel Vadim Kotchergine.

== Political activity ==
=== Days of Rage ===
On October 6, 1969, the Weathermen blew up an 1889 commemorative nine-foot bronze statue of a policeman located in Haymarket Square in Chicago, Illinois, preceding several days of street fighting between protesters and police. According to FBI records, the "Days of Rage" or the "National Action" descended into riots and confrontations with Chicago Police, leaving a vast amount of public property destroyed, including 100 shattered windows in the vicinity. The Weather Underground Organization (WUO) made a number of demands, primarily related to the Vietnam War. Whitehorn and approximately 55 other people were arrested for their participation. A federal grand jury in Chicago later returned a number of indictments charging WUO members with violation of Federal Anti-Riot Laws. The Anti-Riot Law charges were dropped in January 1974.

=== Townhouse explosion ===
Whitehorn said of the March 6, 1970 Greenwich Village townhouse explosion: "We were out of touch with what was going on, and we lost sight of the fact that if you're a revolutionary, the first thing you have to try to do is preserve human life." Three Weathermen died in the explosion: Terry Robbins, Diana Oughton, and Ted Gold.

Whitehorn said great care was taken during bombings to ensure that no one would be hurt. The dead end of militancy and violence for their own sake was obvious after the townhouse explosion, says Whitehorn. Events at the 1972 Republican National Convention protest confirmed her belief that they should allow for militancy when guided by a political framework, but not militancy for militancy's sake.

=== Feminist education ===
In 1971, Whitehorn helped organize and lead a takeover and occupation of a Harvard University building by nearly 400 women to protest the Vietnam War and demand the founding of the Cambridge Women's Center. One of the founders of the Boston/Cambridge Women's School, Whitehorn helped establish the school as an alternative source of feminist education. Operated and taught by a collective of female volunteers until it closed in 1992, the Boston/Cambridge Women's School was the longest running women's school in the United States at the time.

=== Battle of Boston ===
During the Boston desegregation busing crisis, which the WUO referred to as "the Battle of Boston", Whitehorn was among a small group of the Prairie Fire Organizing Committee (PFOC) activists in the Boston area who sat in people's homes, protecting them from local white supremacists who tried to attack them with baseball bats, Molotov cocktails and spray-paint. While Whitehorn and other members of the above-ground cadre carried out their vigilance for two years, the WUO engaged in only minor confrontational tactics in response to the Boston crisis.

=== Prairie Fire Organizing Committee ===
The Prairie Fire Organizing Committee, of which Whitehorn was a member, planned the Hard Times Conference (with WUO support and leadership) as a way to build a national multiracial coalition. The goal was to bring together a multiracial crowd of more than 2,000 people at the University of Illinois Circle Campus in Chicago, from January 30 to February 1, 1976. The slogan for the conference was "Hard Times are Fighting Times".

Even though attendance far surpassed what the WUO and PFOC had anticipated, the conference was a political disaster. Whitehorn was so nauseated by the politics of the conference that she became physically ill in the middle of it. She then began to pull away from the WUO.

By the early 1980s, Whitehorn was active in a variety of radical organizations in addition to the May 19th Communist Organization, including the John Brown Anti-Klan Committee and the Madame Binh Graphics Collective. During this time, Whitehorn worked with subversive movements in Rhodesia, South Africa, and Palestine.

== Bombings and indictment ==
The May 19th Communist Organization, also known as the May 19th Coalition and the May 19 Communist Movement, was a self-described revolutionary organization formed by splintered-off members of the Weather Underground. Originally known as the New York Chapter of the Prairie Fire Organizing Committee (PFOC), the group was active from 1978 to 1985. Between 1983 and 1985, the group bombed the United States Senate as well as three military installations in the Washington, D.C. area and four sites in New York City in protest of the military interventions in Grenada and Lebanon.

=== Arrests ===
On May 11, 1985, group members Marilyn Buck, wanted for her role in the 1981 Brink's robbery, and Linda Sue Evans were arrested in Dobbs Ferry, New York by FBI agents who had trailed them in the hope the pair would lead them to other fugitives. Whitehorn was arrested the same day in a Baltimore apartment rented by Buck and Evans. At the time of the arrests, group members Susan Rosenberg and Timothy Blunk were already under arrest, Rosenberg for explosives and weapons charges connected with the Brink's robbery, Blunk for similar charges. Fugitive group members Alan Berkman and Elizabeth Ann Duke were captured by the FBI 12 days later near Philadelphia; however, Duke disappeared before trial. The case became known as the Resistance Conspiracy case.

=== Indictment, plea and sentencing ===
On May 12, 1988, the seven members of the group under arrest were indicted. The indictment described the goal of the conspiracy as being "to influence, change and protest policies and practices of the United States Government concerning various international and domestic matters through the use of violent and illegal means" and charged the seven with bombing the United States Capitol, three military installations in the Washington, D.C. area, and four sites in New York City. The military sites bombed were the National War College at Fort McNair, the Washington Navy Yard Computer Center, and the Washington Navy Yard Officers Club. In New York City, the sites bombed were the Staten Island Federal Building, the Israeli Aircraft Industries building, the South African consulate, and the offices of the Patrolmen's Benevolent Association.

On September 6, 1990 The New York Times reported that Whitehorn, Evans, and Buck had agreed to plead guilty to conspiracy and destruction of government property. Prosecutors agreed to drop bombing charges against Rosenberg, Blunk, and Berkman, who were already serving long prison terms (Rosenberg and Blunk 58 years, Berkman 10) for possession of explosives and weapons. Whitehorn also agreed to plead guilty to fraud in the possession of false identification documents found by the FBI in the Baltimore apartment.

At the December 6, 1990 sentencing of Whitehorn and Evans by federal judge Harold H. Greene, in a courtroom full of supporters, Whitehorn was sentenced to 20 years in prison and Evans to an additional five years after completing a 35-year sentence being served for illegally buying guns. Buck was already serving 17 years on other convictions, and was later sentenced to a 50-year term for the Brink's holdup and other armed robberies.

=== Years in prison ===
During the years Whitehorn served in prison, she directed AIDS education and wrote numerous publications. She described her political work in prison as consisting of three areas: being a political prisoner, organizing and participating in struggles for justice inside the prisons, and working to fight against HIV/AIDS.

Whitehorn lost many friends while she was in prison during some of the worst years of the AIDS epidemic. While Whitehorn served time in a federal women's prison in Lexington, Kentucky, her father Nathaniel Whitehorn died on January 3, 1992. Whitehorn noted that not being with loved ones while they are dying and not being able to go to the memorial service is one of the way families are destroyed by prison.

On August 6, 1999 Whitehorn was released on parole after serving just over 14 years.

== Life after prison ==
Since her release from prison in August 1999, Whitehorn has been involved in a wide range of causes, including the release of political prisoners. She lives in New York City with her partner, Susie Day.

She has contributed writings and artwork to numerous books and articles and has been a guest speaker at several universities, including as an official guest of the African American Studies Department at Duke University in 2003, where she was presented as a human rights activist by Duke faculty.

A past senior editor with POZ magazine, much of her writing has to do with supporting AIDS healthcare providers and empowering AIDS patients. Whitehorn is a member of the New York State task force on political prisoners, a group dedicated to supporting New York State political prisoners of the Black liberation movement and anti-imperialist solidarity movement.

In 2013, Whitehorn, along with Kathy Boudin, Mujahid Farid, and Soffiyah Elijah, founded the Release Aging People in Prison campaign.

Whitehorn appears in the documentary films OUT: The Making of a Revolutionary (2002), directed by Sonja DeVries, and The Weather Underground (2002), directed by Sam Green and Bill Siegel.
