= Silvia Baraldini =

Italian activist (born 1947)

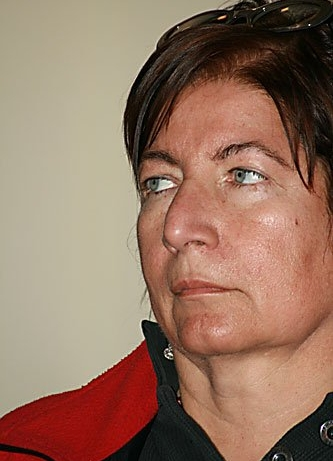
- Baraldini in 2008
- Born: Silvia Baraldini; December 12, 1947 (age 78); Rome, Italy
- Education: University of Wisconsin–Madison
- Occupation: Activist
- Known for: Black Power, Puerto Rican independence movements

Silvia Baraldini (December 12, 1947) is an Italian political activist. From the age of 12, she lived in the United States and became a student radical. She joined the Prairie Fire Organizing Committee and the May 19th Communist Organization, groups which aimed to support Black Power and Puerto Rican independence movements. In 1977, Baraldini acted as the spokesperson for the protestors outside the court during the trial of Assata Shakur. Two years later, on November 2, 1979, she helped to break Shakur out of jail, driving the getaway car.

After participating in several bank robberies, during which two security guards were killed, Baraldini was caught in 1982, convicted of conspiracy and imprisoned in a maximum security unit in Lexington, Kentucky, after her 1982 arrest and sentencing to 43 years incarceration.

Baraldini was treated for cancer twice during her imprisonment. She was transferred to Italy in 1999 to serve the remainder of her sentence, and was released into house arrest in 2001, before being pardoned five years later by Minister of Justice Clemente Mastella. Her life has been the subject of the documentaries Ore d'aria – La vita di Silvia Baraldini (Hours outside: The life of Silvia Baraldini) in 2002 and Freeing Silvia Baraldini.

== Activism ==
Silvia Pia Baraldini was born on December 12, 1947, in Rome, Italy. When she was 12, her parents moved the family to the U.S., first to the Bronx in New York City and then to Washington, D.C., where she attended Woodrow Wilson High School. After graduation in 1965, she enrolled at the University of Wisconsin–Madison. She became a student radical, joining Students for a Democratic Society (SDS).

After university, Baraldini continued her political activism, participating in the Panther 21 defense committee and joining the Prairie Fire Organizing Committee. When the latter fell apart in 1976, Baraldini and other feminists, most of whom lived in Brooklyn, set up a new group called the May 19th Communist Organization (M19). Baraldini teamed up with Susan Rosenberg and Judy Clark, aiming to support black liberation struggles and the FALN (Fuerzas Armadas de Liberación Nacional) which advocated independence for Puerto Rico. She began to assist her friend Mutulu Shakur of the Black Liberation Army (BLA) with tasks such as hiring cars. In 1977, Marilyn Buck (one of the few white members of the BLA) skipped bail and M19 found her a safe house in East Orange, New Jersey.

Baraldini and Shakur introduced Buck to the New Afrikan activist Sekou Odinga, and the four devised a group called the Family, in which the black members would rob banks to fund revolutionary struggles and the white members would support them. The Black Liberation Army (BLA) participants were Shakur, Odinga, Mtayari Shabaka Sundiata, Kuwasi Balagoon and Tyrone Rison, who decided upon the robberies. The M19 team of Baraldini, Buck, Clark and Rosenberg provided logistical support by buying firearms and driving the getaway vehicles. The M19 participants emphasised that they did not want to harm people and they were upset when on June 2, 1981, a security guard was shot dead by Rison when the Family robbed a Brink's armored car as it delivered cash to a Chase Manhattan bank in the Bronx.

On October 20, 1981, the Family carried out another armed robbery in Nanuet, New York. It was not successful and two police officers and a security guard were shot dead. By tracing the license plates on the getaway cars, the police were able to track down some of the gang members. Baraldini married fellow activist Tim Blunk to avoid the possibility of deportation to Italy and acted as a spokesperson for the arrestees before she herself was arrested a year later.

== Arrest and conviction ==
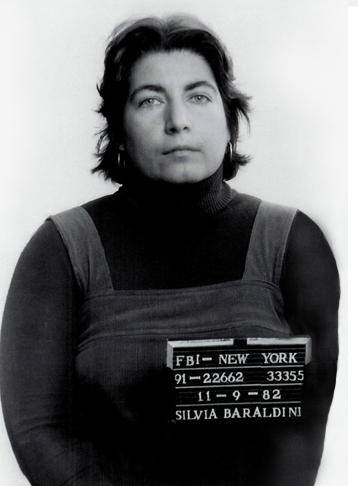
Baraldini when arrested in 1982

On November 9, 1982, Baraldini was arrested on the street in New York City close to her home on the Upper West Side. A carbon copy of a typed FALN responsibility claim was found at her apartment when it was searched. At trial, she was represented at first by the radical criminal attorney Susan Tipograph, for whom she had previously worked as a paralegal. She was charged alongside Chui Ferguson, Edward Joseph, Sekou Odinga and Bilal Sunni-Ali under the Racketeer Influenced and Corrupt Organizations Act (RICO) for being part of a conspiracy to carry out armed robberies. Baraldini and Odinga received the heaviest sentences. She was sentenced to 43 years in prison for the conspiracy, as well as for being involved in Assata Shakur's escape and for refusing to testify in front of a grand jury.

Human rights activists objected to the length of Baraldini's sentence. She also received publicity when she was placed alongside Susan Rosenberg and Alejandrina Torres (a FALN member) in a purpose-built underground prison called the High Security Unit (HSU) at the Federal Medical Center in Lexington, Kentucky. The prisoners were kept shackled, monitored by CCTV, repeatedly strip-searched, permitted little reading material, saw no daylight and had restricted time with visitors. Amnesty International condemned the SHU and called for it to be shut down. The women were told by the prison officers that unless they renounced their politics, they would stay in the unit indefinitely. Nina Rosenblum directed the 1989 documentary Through the Wire about the experiences of the three women incarcerated in Lexington. It was narrated by Susan Sarandon. Conditions in the unit were criticized by Amnesty International.

Baraldini was held in the SHU for almost two years, until the unit was closed by judicial order. She had developed uterine cancer while at Lexington, and was later treated in a prison in Minnesota. Afterwards she was moved to a control unit at the Federal Correctional Institution, Marianna in Florida.

== Repatriation ==
Italy first requested that Baraldini serve the rest of her sentence in her country of birth in 1989. It made further submissions ito the US in 1992, 1993, 1995, and 1997. The US refused to consider the requests on the grounds that she showed no remorse for her crimes. She was visited in 1991 at Marianna prison by the Italian judge Giovanni Falcone. In Italy, pressure grew for her repatriation. President Francesco Cossiga and Prime Minister Giulio Andreotti both addressed the issue with President George H. W. Bush, then Prime Minister Massimo D'Alema spoke to Bill Clinton.

After 17 years incarcerated in US prisons, in 1999 Baraldini travelled to Rome from the Federal Correctional Institution, Danbury in Connecticut. She was met by her mother, the president of the Party of Italian Communists Armando Cossutta, and Minister of Justice Oliviero Diliberto. The Italian government pledged that she would remain imprisoned until July 29, 2008, the first date at which she was eligible for parole in the US. She was jailed at Rebibbia prison and a year later complained that she had been treated better in US prisons and she wanted to return. She said she had less freedom than at Danbury, was being refused treatment for breast cancer and could only make two telephone calls a month. In 2001, she was released into house arrest for months in a deal made between the governments of Italy and the US, as a result of her breast cancer, for which she had been receiving treatment at the Agostino Gemelli University Policlinic in Rome. Baraldini was pardoned in 2006 by Minister of Justice Clemente Mastella.

Antonio Bellia released a documentary entitled Ore d'aria – La vita di Silvia Baraldini (Hours outside: The life of Silvia Baraldini) in 2002, then Margo Pelletier and Lisa Thomas released the film Freeing Silvia Baraldini in 2009. The newspaper La Stampa reported in 2011 that she was living quietly in Rome, working in support of migrants through the Associazione Ricreativa e Culturale Italiana (ARCI).
