= Black power movement =

1960s to 1980s African-American social movement

- Part of the counterculture of the 1960s
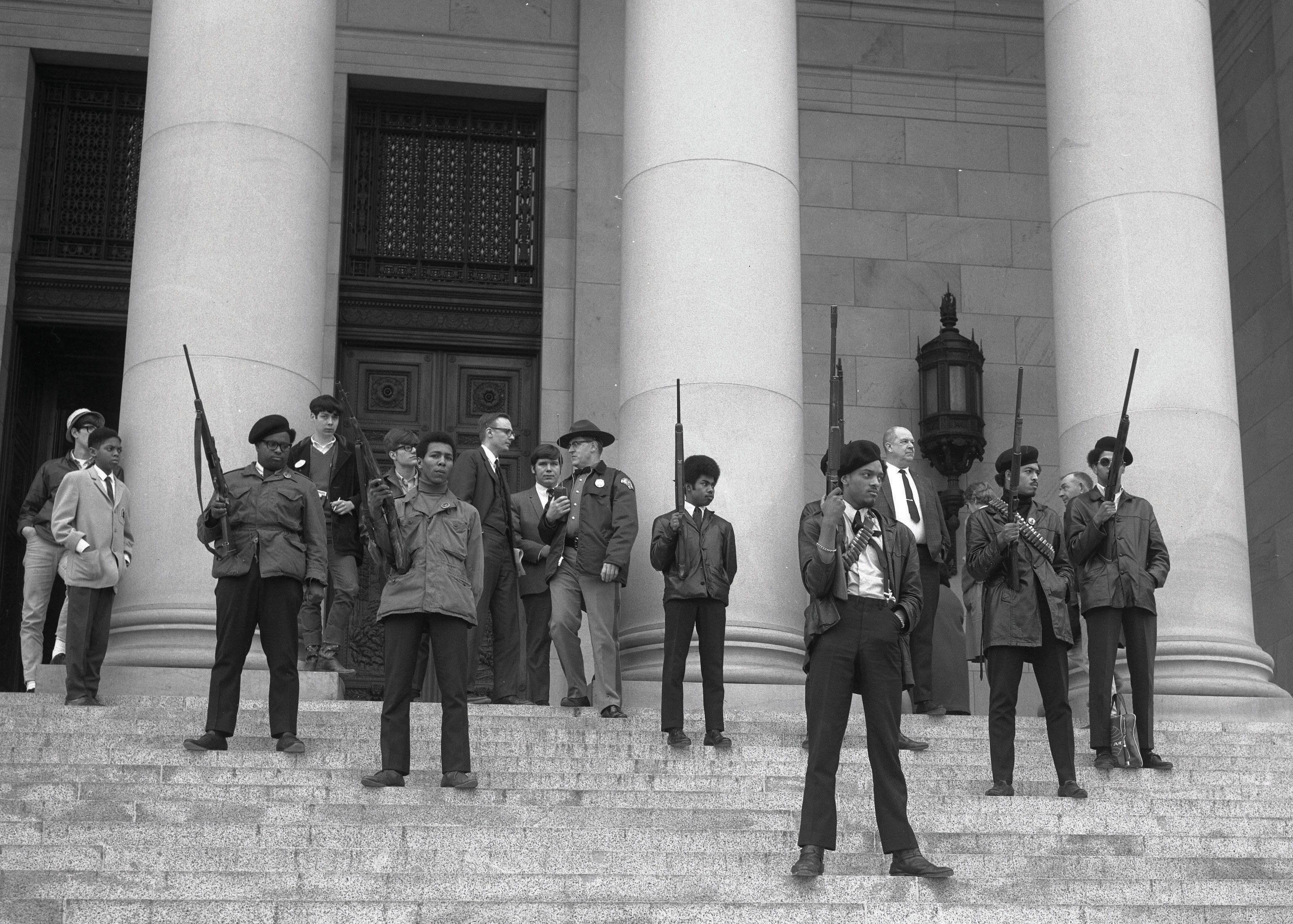
- Black Panther Party members protest a gun control bill in Olympia, Washington, on February 28, 1969.
- Date: 1966–1980s
- Location: United States
- Caused by: Perceived failures of the civil rights movement; Turn towards militancy
- Result: Worldwide spread of Black power ideals; Passage of Civil Rights Act of 1968; Decline in incidence of mass racial violence in the United States; Establishment of Black-operated services and businesses; Decline by the 1980s

Parties
Nation of Islam
- Malcolm X
Black Panther Party
- Huey P. Newton
- Fred Hampton

The Black power movement or Black liberation movement emerged in the 1960s from the mainstream civil rights movement in the United States, reacting against its moderate and incremental tendencies and representing the demand for more immediate action to counter white supremacy. Many of its ideas were influenced by Malcolm X's criticism of Martin Luther King Jr.'s peaceful protest methods. The 1965 assassination of Malcolm X, coupled with the urban riots of 1964 and 1965, ignited the movement. While thinkers such as Malcolm X influenced the early movement, the views of the Black Panther Party, founded in 1966, are widely seen as the cornerstone. Black power was influenced by philosophies such as pan-Africanism, Black nationalism, and socialism, as well as contemporary events such as the Cuban Revolution and the decolonisation of Africa.

During the peak of the Black power movement in the late 1960s and early 1970s, many African Americans adopted "Afro" hairstyles, African clothes, or African names (such as Stokely Carmichael, the chairman of the Student Nonviolent Coordinating Committee who popularized the phrase "Black power" and later changed his name to Kwame Ture) to emphasize their identity. Others founded Black-owned stores, food cooperatives, bookstores, publishers, media, clinics, schools, and other organizations oriented to their communities. American universities began to offer courses in Black studies, and the word Black replaced Negro as the preferred usage in the country.

Some Black power organizations prioritized social programs, while others adopted a more militant approach; for instance, the Black Panther Party introduced a Free Breakfast for Children program and established community health clinics, while the Black Liberation Army carried out bombings and murdered police officers. The movement never had a central authority or structure, and its influence was diluted by legislation such as the Fair Housing Act of 1968, the expansion of federally funded welfare programs, and police action against its activists. The Black power movement declined by the mid-1970s and 1980s, as civil rights activists increasingly focused on electing Black politicians over militant struggle, though its legacy has influenced later movements, such as Black Lives Matter.

== History ==
=== Origin ===
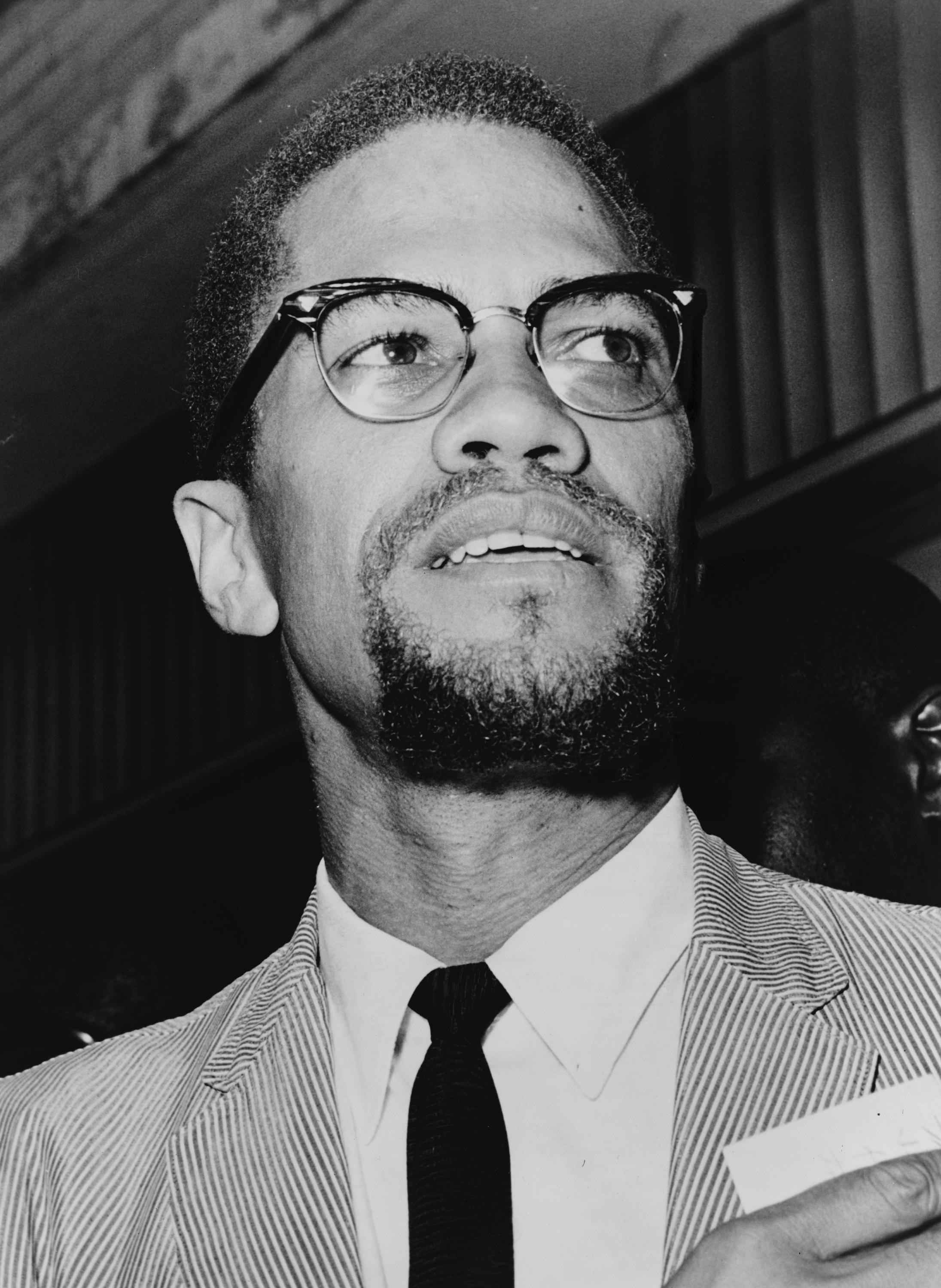
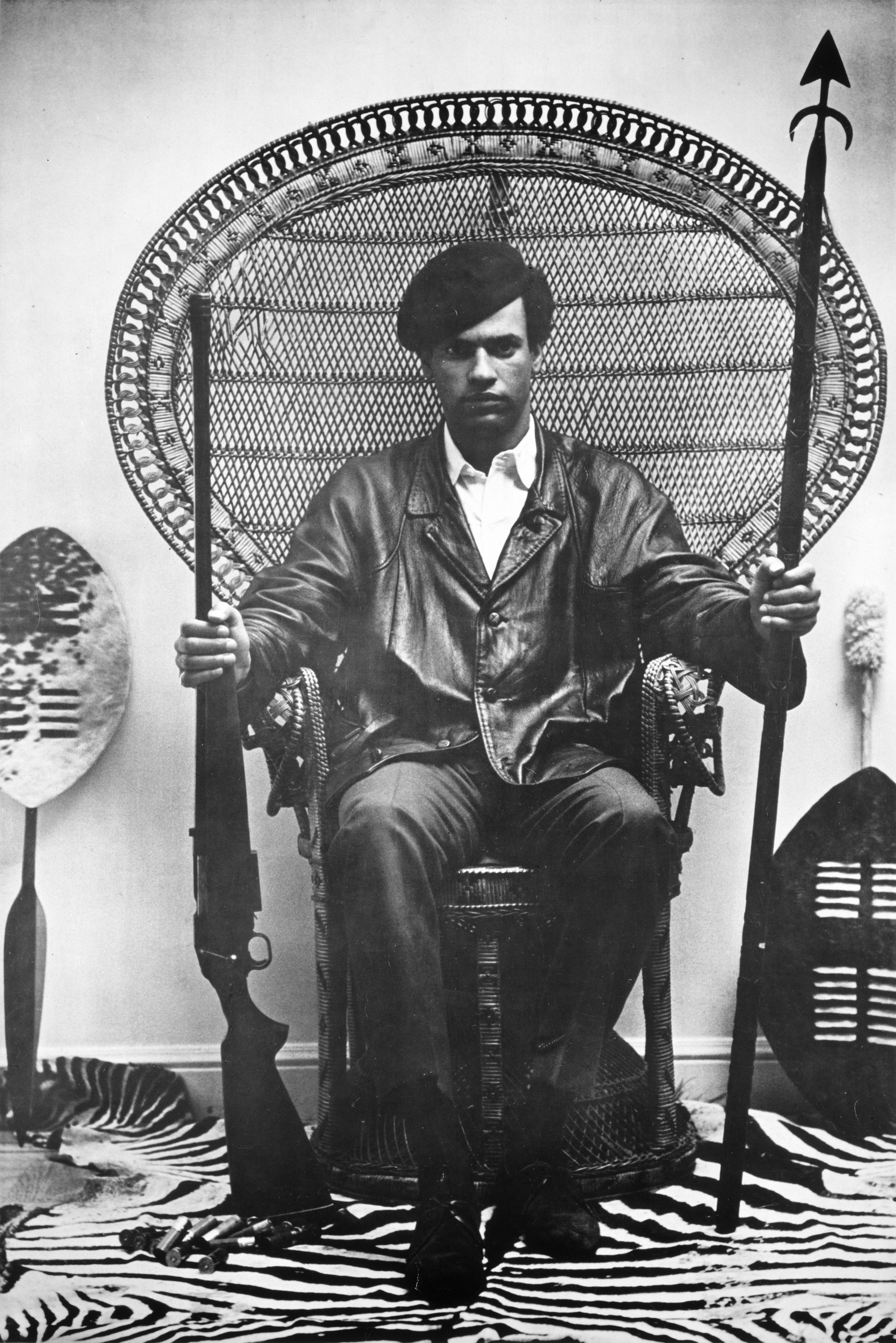
Malcolm X (left) and Huey Newton, prominent leaders of the Black power movement

The first popular use of the term "Black power" as a social and racial slogan was by Stokely Carmichael (later known as Kwame Ture) and Willie Ricks (later known as Mukasa Dada), both organizers and spokespeople for the Student Nonviolent Coordinating Committee. On June 16, 1966, in a speech in Greenwood, Mississippi, during the March Against Fear, Carmichael led the marchers in a chant for Black power that was televised nationally.

The organization Nation of Islam began as a Black nationalist movement in the 1930s, inspiring later groups. It was strongly influenced by Pan-Asianism, especially with respect to Japan, believing in a unity between non-White peoples. Kevin Gaines has argued that in the 1950s, an early version of the Black Power movement was restrained due to Cold War tensions. This was done through methods like the restriction of passports. Figures such as W. E. B. Du Bois, Paul Robeson and Julian Mayfield were part of this and some, including Mayfield, felt forced to emigrate the United States and continue their activism elsewhere, with Mayfield going to Ghana.

Malcolm X is largely credited with the group's dramatic increase in membership between the early 1950s and early 1960s (from 500 to 25,000 by one estimate; from 1,200 to 50,000 or 75,000 by another). In March 1964, Malcolm X left the Nation due to disagreements with Elijah Muhammad; among other things, he cited his interest in working with civil rights leaders, saying that Muhammad had prevented him from doing so. Later, Malcolm X also said Muhammad had engaged in extramarital affairs with young Nation secretaries‍—‌a serious violation of the group's teachings. On February 21, 1965, Malcolm X was shot and killed while speaking at the Audubon Ballroom in Washington Heights, New York City. Three Nation members were convicted of assassinating him. Despite this, there has long been speculation and suspicion of government involvement. The forty police officers at the scene were instructed to "stand down" by their commanding officers while the shooting took place.

After the Watts riots in Los Angeles in 1965, the Student Nonviolent Coordinating Committee decided to cut ties with the mainstream civil rights movement. They argued that Blacks needed to build power of their own, rather than seek accommodations from the power structure in place. SNCC migrated from a philosophy of nonviolence to one of greater militancy after the mid-1960s. The organization established ties with radical groups such as the Students for a Democratic Society.

In late October 1966, Huey P. Newton and Bobby Seale founded the Black Panther Party. In formulating a new politics, they drew on their experiences working with a variety of Black power organizations.

=== Escalation in the late 1960s ===
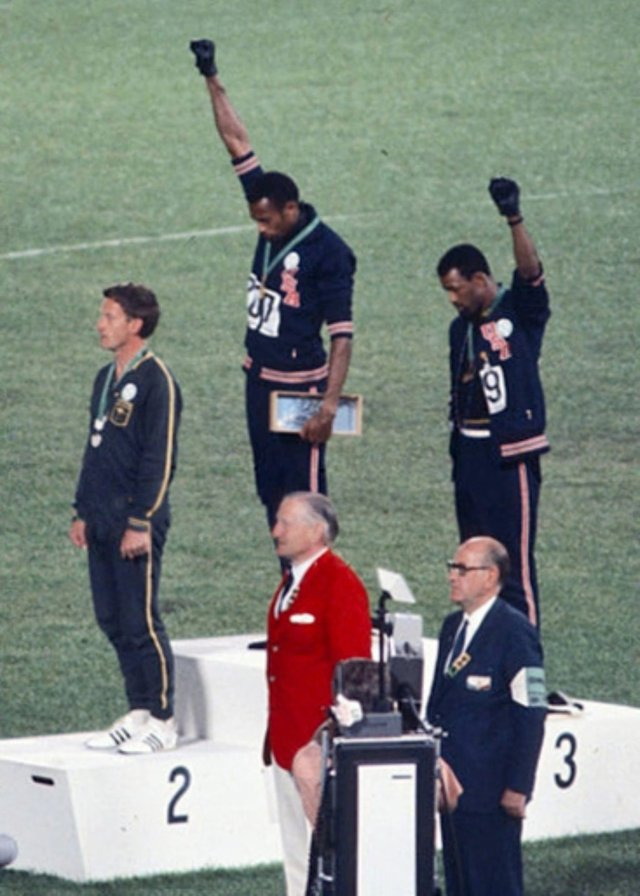
Tommie Smith and John Carlos raise their fists in a Black power salute at the 1968 Summer Olympics.

The Black Panther Party initially utilized open-carry gun laws to protect party members and local Black communities from law enforcement. Party members also recorded incidents of police brutality by distantly following police cars around neighborhoods. Numbers grew slightly starting in February 1967, when the party provided an armed escort at the San Francisco airport for Betty Shabazz, Malcolm X's widow and keynote speaker at a conference held in his honor. By 1967, the SNCC began to fall apart due to policy disputes in its leadership, and many members left for the Black Panthers. Throughout 1967, the Panthers staged rallies and disrupted the California State Assembly with armed marchers. In 1956 the FBI developed COINTELPRO to investigate Black nationalist groups and others. By 1969, the Black Panthers and their allies had become primary COINTELPRO targets, singled out in 233 of the 295 authorized "Black nationalist" COINTELPRO actions. In 1968, the Republic of New Afrika was founded, a separatist group seeking a Black country in the southern United States, only to dissolve by the early 1970s.

At the 1968 Summer Olympics in Mexico City, Tommie Smith and John Carlos, the gold and bronze medalists, respectively, in the 200 meters event, each raised a black-gloved hand as the American national anthem was played during their medal ceremony. Afterwards, Smith stated that: "We are Black and we are proud of being Black. Black America will understand what we did."

By 1968, many Black Panther leaders had been arrested, including founder Huey Newton for the murder of a police officer (Newton's prosecution was eventually dismissed), yet membership surged. Black Panthers later engaged the police in a firefight in a Los Angeles gas station. In the same year, Martin Luther King Jr. was assassinated, creating nationwide riots, the widest wave of social unrest since the American Civil War. In Cleveland, Ohio, the "Republic of New Libya" engaged the police in the Glenville shootout, which was followed by rioting. The year also marked the start of the White Panther Party, a group of Whites dedicated to the cause of the Black Panthers. Founders Pun Plamondon and John Sinclair were arrested, but eventually freed, in connection to the bombing of a Central Intelligence Agency office in Ann Arbor, Michigan, that September.

By 1969, the Black Panthers began purging members due to fear of law enforcement infiltration, engaged in multiple gunfights with police and one with a Black nationalist organization. The Panthers continued their "Free Huey" campaign internationally. In the spirit of rising militancy, the League of Revolutionary Black Workers was formed in Detroit, which supported labor rights and Black liberation.

=== Peak in the early 1970s ===
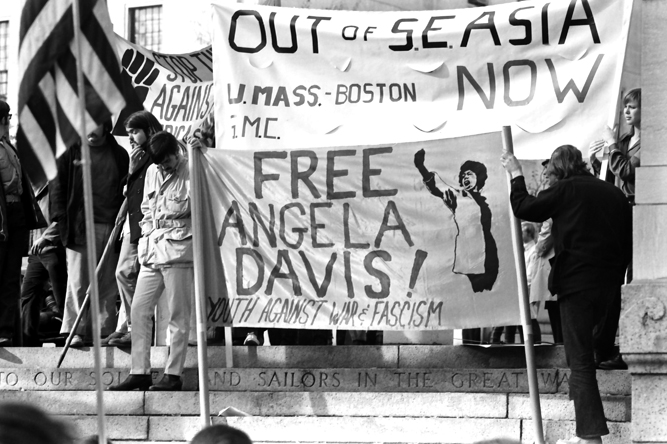
Protesters demanding the release of Angela Davis

In 1970 the Honorary Prime Minister of the Black Panther Party, Stokely Carmichael, traveled to various countries to discuss methods to resist "American imperialism". In Trinidad, the Black power Movement had escalated into the Black Power Revolution in which many Afro-Trinidadians forced the government of Trinidad to give into reforms. Later many Panthers visited Algeria to discuss Pan-Africanism and anti-imperialism. In the same year former Black Panthers formed the Black Liberation Army to continue a violent revolution rather than the party's new reform movements. On October 22, 1970, the Black Liberation Army is believed to have planted a bomb in St. Brendan's Church in San Francisco while it was full of mourners attending the funeral of San Francisco police officer Harold Hamilton, who had been killed in the line of duty while responding to a bank robbery. The bomb was detonated, but no one in the church suffered serious injuries.

In 1971, several Panther officials fled the U.S. due to police concerns. This was the only active year of the Black Revolutionary Assault Team, a group that bombed the New York South African consular office in protest of apartheid. On September 20 it placed bombs at the UN Missions of Republic of the Congo (Kinshasa) and the Republic of Malawi. In February 1971, ideological splits within the Black Panther Party between leaders Newton and Eldridge Cleaver led to two factions within the party; the conflict turned violent and four people were killed in a series of assassinations. On May 21, 1971, five Black Liberation Army members participated in the shootings of two New York City police officers, Joseph Piagentini and Waverly Jones. Those brought to trial for the shootings include Anthony Bottom (also known as Jalil Muntaqim), Albert Washington, Francisco Torres, Gabriel Torres, and Herman Bell.

During the jail sentence of White Panther John Sinclair a "Free John" concert took place, including John Lennon and Stevie Wonder. Sinclair was released two days later. On August 29, three BLA members murdered San Francisco police sergeant John Victor Young at his police station. Two days later, the San Francisco Chronicle received a letter signed by the BLA claiming responsibility for the attack. Late in the year Huey Newton visited China for meetings on Maoist theory and anti-imperialism. Black power icon George Jackson attempted to escape from prison in August, killing seven hostages only to be killed himself. Jackson's death triggered the Attica Prison uprising which was later ended in a bloody siege. On November 3, Officer James R. Greene of the Atlanta Police Department was shot and killed in his patrol van at a gas station by Black Liberation Army members.

1972 was the year Newton shut down many Black Panther chapters and held a party meeting in Oakland, California. On January 27, the Black Liberation Army assassinated police officers Gregory Foster and Rocco Laurie in New York City. After the killings, a note sent to authorities portrayed the murders as a retaliation for the prisoner deaths during 1971 Attica prison riot. To date no arrests have been made. On July 31, five armed BLA members hijacked Delta Air Lines Flight 841, eventually collecting a ransom of $1 million and diverting the plane, after passengers were released, to Algeria. The authorities there seized the ransom but allowed the group to flee. Four were eventually caught by French authorities in Paris, where they were convicted of various crimes, but one—George Wright—remained a fugitive until September 26, 2011, when he was captured in Portugal. After being accused of murdering a prostitute in 1974, Huey Newton fled to Cuba. Elaine Brown became party leader and embarked on an election campaign.

=== De-escalation in the late 1970s ===
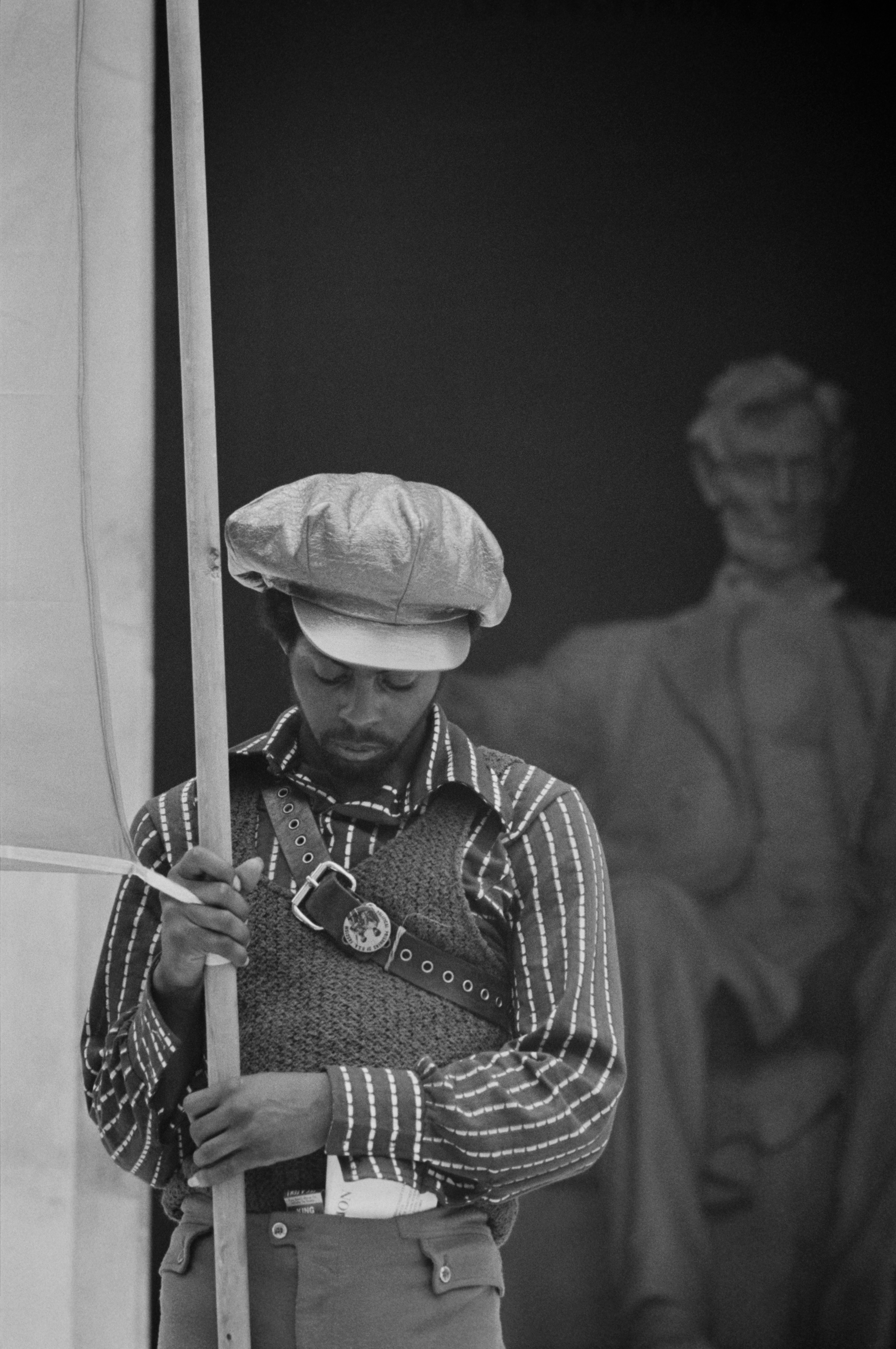
Black Panther at the Lincoln Memorial in Washington, June 1970

In the late 1970s a rebel group named after the killed prisoner formed the George Jackson Brigade. From March 1975 to December 1977, the Brigade robbed at least seven banks and detonated about 20 pipe bombs—mainly targeting government buildings, electric power facilities, Safeway stores, and companies accused of racism. In 1977, Newton returned from exile in Cuba. Shortly afterward, Elaine Brown resigned from the party and fled to Los Angeles. The Party fell apart, leaving only a few members.

MOVE developed in Philadelphia in 1972 as the "Christian Movement for Life", a communal living group based on Black Liberation principles. When police raided their house in 1978, a firefight broke out; during the shootout, one officer was killed, seven other police officers, five firefighters, three MOVE members, and three bystanders were also injured.

In another high-profile incident of the Black Liberation Army, Assata Shakur, Zayd Shakur and Sundiata Acoli were said to have opened fire on state troopers in New Jersey after being pulled over for a broken taillight. Zayd Shakur and state trooper Werner Foerster were both killed during the exchange. Following her capture, Assata Shakur was tried in six different criminal trials. According to Shakur, she was beaten and tortured during her incarceration in a number of different federal and state prisons. The charges ranged from kidnapping to assault and battery to bank robbery. Assata Shakur was found guilty of the murder of both Foerster and her companion Zayd Shakur, but escaped prison in 1979 and eventually fled to Cuba and received political asylum. Acoli was convicted of killing Foerster and sentenced to life in prison.

In 1978 a group of Black Liberation Army and Weather Underground members formed the May 19th Communist Organization, or M19CO. It also included members of the Black Panthers and the Republic of New Africa. In 1979 three M19CO members walked into the visitor center at the Clinton Correctional Facility for Women near Clinton, New Jersey. They took two guards hostage and freed Shakur. Several months later M19CO arranged for the escape of William Morales, a member of Puerto Rican separatist group Fuerzas Armadas de Liberación Nacional Puertorriqueña from Bellevue Hospital in New York City, where he was recovering after a bomb he was building exploded in his hands.

=== Decline in the 1980s ===
Over the 1980s the Black power movement continued despite a decline in its popularity and organization memberships. The Black Liberation Army was active in the US until at least 1981 when a Brinks truck robbery, conducted with support from former Weather Underground members Kathy Boudin and David Gilbert, left a guard and two police officers dead. Boudin and Gilbert, along with several BLA members, were subsequently arrested. M19CO engaged in a bombing campaign in the 1980s. They targeted a series of government and commercial buildings, including the U.S. Senate. On November 3, 1984, two members of the M19CO, Susan Rosenberg and Timothy Blunk, were arrested at a mini-warehouse they had rented in Cherry Hill, New Jersey. Police recovered more than 100 blasting caps, nearly 200 sticks of dynamite, more than 100 cartridges of gel explosive, and 24 bags of blasting agent from the warehouse. The M19CO alliance's last bombing was on February 23, 1985, at the Policemen's Benevolent Association in New York City.

MOVE had relocated to West Philadelphia after the earlier shootout. On May 13, 1985, the police, along with city manager Leo Brooks, arrived with arrest warrants and attempted to clear the MOVE building and arrest the indicted MOVE members. This led to an armed standoff with police, who lobbed tear gas canisters at the building. MOVE members shot at the police, who returned fire with automatic weapons. The police then bombed the house, killing several adults and children, and causing a large fire that destroyed the better part of a city block.

In 1989, well into the waning years of the movement, the New Black Panther Party formed. In the same year on August 22, Huey P. Newton was fatally shot outside by 24-year-old Black Guerilla Family member Tyrone Robinson.

== Characteristics ==
=== Education ===
The fifth point of the Black Panther Party's Ten-Point Program called for "education for our people that exposes the true nature of this decadent American society. We want education that teaches us our true history and our role in the present day society." This sentiment was echoed in many of the other Black power organizations; the inadequacy of Black education had earlier been remarked on by W. E. B. Du Bois, Marcus Garvey, and Carter G. Woodson.

With this backdrop, Stokely Carmichael brought political education into his work with SNCC in the rural South. This included get-out-the-vote campaigns and political literacy. Bobby Seale and Huey Newton used education to address the lack of identity in the Black community. Seale had worked with youth in an after-school program before starting the Panthers. Through this new education and identity building, they believed they could empower Black Americans to claim their freedom.

=== Media ===
Just as Black power activists focused on community control of schools and politics, the movement took a major interest in creating and controlling its own media institutions. Most famously, the Black Panther Party produced the Black Panther newspaper, which proved to be one of the BPP's most influential tools for disseminating its message and recruiting new members.

WAFR was launched in September 1971 as the first public, community-based Black radio station. The Durham, North Carolina, station broadcast until 1976, but influenced later activist radio stations including WPFW in Washington, D.C., and WRFG in Atlanta.

== Australian Black power ==
The American Black power movement influenced Aboriginal Australian activists from the late 1960s onwards, especially in Sydney, Brisbane and Melbourne. The term became widely known after the Victorian Aborigines Advancement League (AAL), led by Bruce McGuinness and Bob Maza, invited Caribbean activist Roosevelt Brown to give a talk on Black power in Melbourne in 1968, causing a media frenzy. The AAL was influenced by the ideas of Malcolm X and Stokely Carmichael. The Australian "Black power movement" had emerged in Redfern in Sydney, Fitzroy, Melbourne, and South Brisbane, following the "Freedom Ride" led by Charles Perkins in 1965. There was a small group of people at the centre of the movement known as the Black Caucus.

Bobbi Sykes defined Australian Black power as "The power generated by people who seek to identify their own problems and those of the community as a whole, and who strive to take action in all possible forms to solve those problems", while Paul Coe saw it as the need for Aboriginal people to "take control both of the economical, the political and cultural resources of the people and of the land…so that they themselves have got the power to determine their own future". Activist and later academic Gary Foley later wrote that in Australia, Black power "was essentially about the necessity for Black people to define the world in their own terms, and to seek self-determination and independence on their own terms, without white interference". The Aboriginal Legal Service in Redfern grew out of this activism.

In 1973, land rights activist Eddie Koiki Mabo and his friend Burnum Burnum established the Black Community School in the city of Townsville, Queensland for the education of local Aboriginal and Torres Strait Islander children. The school aimed to provide a program better suited to the children's needs, and which would better reflect their culture in comparison to the largely white-focused state school system. Mabo acknowledged that there was a fear in the community at the outset that what he was teaching in the school was "black power".

== Legacy ==
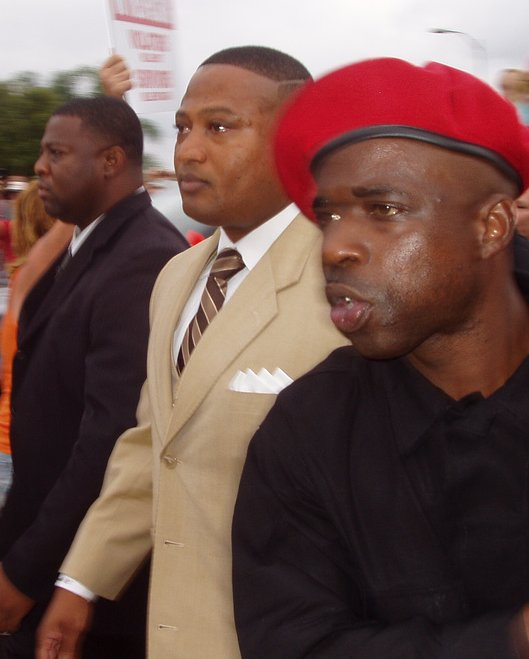
New Black Panther Party members marching in 2007

After the 1970s the Black power movement saw a decline, but not an end. In 1998, the Black Radical Congress was founded, with debatable effects. The Black Riders Liberation Party was created by Bloods and Crips gang members as an attempt to recreate the Black Panther Party in 1996. The group has spread, creating chapters in cities across the United States, and frequently staging paramilitary marches. During the 2008 presidential election New Black Panther Party members were accused of voter intimidation at a polling station in a predominantly Black, Democratic voting district of Philadelphia.

Some have compared the modern movement Black Lives Matter to the Black power movement, noting its similarities. The Movement for Black Lives openly promotes Black power.

== Organizations still operating ==
- Revolutionary Black Panther Party
- New Afrikan Black Panther Party
- Black Riders Liberation Party
- All-African People's Revolutionary Party
- Black Hammer Party
- Freedom Party
- African People's Socialist Party
- Huey P. Newton Gun Club
- MOVE
- Assata's Daughters
- Black Radical Congress

== See also ==
- African-American leftism
- Black mecca
- Black nationalism
- Black Panther Party
- Black supremacy
- Black separatism
- Chicano Movement
- History of the socialist movement in the United States
- New Left
- Black Arts Movement
- Protests of 1968
- Red Power movement
- Los Siete de la Raza

== Bibliography ==
- Konadu, Kwasi; Brown, Scot (2009). A view from the East: black cultural nationalism and education in New York City (2nd ed.). Syracuse, N.Y: Syracuse University Press. ISBN 978-0-8156-5101-7.
- Ogbar, Jeffrey Ogbonna Green (2019). Black Power: Radical Politics and African American Identity (Updated ed.). Baltimore: Johns Hopkins University Press. ISBN 978-1-4214-2976-2.
