= Resistance Conspiracy case =

Trial for 1983 US Senate bombing

The Resistance Conspiracy case (1988–1990) was a federal criminal case in the United States in which six people were charged with the 1983 U.S. Senate bombing and related bombings of Fort McNair and the Washington Navy Yard: Marilyn Jean Buck, Linda Sue Evans, Susan Rosenberg, Timothy Blunk, Alan Berkman, and Elizabeth Ann Duke.

== Background ==
The bombings were claimed by the "Armed Resistance Unit" and were designed to inflict property damage; warning phone calls were made and no one was injured. Between 1983 and 1985, the group bombed the United States Capitol Building as well as three military installations in the Washington D.C. area and four sites in New York City.

Some but not all of those convicted had been members of the May 19 Communist Organization, also known as the May 19th Coalition and the May 19 Communist Movement, a self-described revolutionary organization formed in part by splintered-off members of the Weather Underground. Originally known as the New York Chapter of the Prairie Fire Organizing Committee (PFOC), the group was active from 1978 to 1985.

=== Arrests ===
On May 11, 1985, Marilyn Jean Buck and Linda Sue Evans were arrested in Dobbs Ferry, New York, by FBI agents who had trailed them in the hope the pair would lead them to other fugitives. Laura Whitehorn was arrested the same day in a Baltimore apartment rented by Buck and Evans. At the time of the arrests Susan Rosenberg and Timothy Blunk were already under arrest, Rosenberg for explosives and weapons charges connected with the Brinks robbery, Blunk for similar charges. Fugitive group members Alan Berkman and Elizabeth Ann Duke were captured by the FBI 12 days later near Philadelphia, although Duke jumped bail and disappeared before trial. The case became known as the Resistance Conspiracy Case.

=== Indictment, plea and sentencing ===
On May 12, 1988, the seven members of the group under arrest were indicted. The indictment described the goal of the conspiracy as being "to influence, change and protest policies and practices of the United States Government concerning various international and domestic matters through the use of violent and illegal means" and charged the seven with bombing the United States Capitol Building, three military installations in the Washington D.C. area, and four sites in New York City. The military sites bombed were the National War College at Fort McNair, the Washington Navy Yard Computer Center, and the Washington Navy Yard Officers Club. In New York City, the sites bombed were the Staten Island Federal Building, the Israeli Aircraft Industries Building, the South African consulate, and the offices of the Patrolmen's Benevolent Association.

On September 6, 1990 The New York Times reported that Whitehorn, Evans and Buck had agreed to plead guilty to conspiracy and destruction of government property. Prosecutors agreed to drop bombing charges against Rosenberg, Blunk and Berkman, who were already serving long prison terms (Rosenberg and Blunk 58 years, Berkman 10) for possession of explosives and weapons. Whitehorn also agreed to plead guilty to fraud in the possession of false identification documents found by the FBI in the Baltimore apartment.

At the December 6, 1990, sentencing of Whitehorn and Evans by Federal District Judge Harold H. Greene, in a courtroom packed with supporters, Whitehorn was sentenced to 20 years in prison and Evans to an additional five years after completing a 35-year sentence being served for illegally buying guns. Buck was already serving 17 years on other convictions, and was later sentenced to a 50-year term for the Brinks holdup and other armed robberies.

On August 6, 1999, Whitehorn was released on parole after serving just over 14 years.

On January 20, 2001, his last day in office, President Bill Clinton commuted the sentences of Evans and Rosenberg.
