= John Brown Anti-Klan Committee =

U.S.-based anti-racist organization

- Abbreviation: JBAKC
- Formation: 1978-ca. 1990
- Type: Radical left
- Purpose: Opposition to white supremacy, Zionism and US foreign policy
- Location: United States of America

The John Brown Anti-Klan Committee (JBAKC) was an anti-racist organization based in the United States. The group protested against the Ku Klux Klan (KKK) and other white supremacist organizations and published anti-racist literature. Members of the JBAKC were involved in a string of bombings of military, government, and corporate targets in the 1980s. The JBAKC viewed themselves as anti-imperialists and considered African Americans, Native Americans, Puerto Ricans, and Mexicans to be oppressed colonial peoples.

The JBAKC was started in 1978 by a group of white anti-racist activists with ties to the Weather Underground. They named the organization after abolitionist John Brown, who advocated and engaged in violence as a means to end slavery in the U.S. According to founding member Lisa Roth, the event that triggered the formation of the group was the discovery that the KKK was actively organizing in New York State prisons. The JBAKC soon had chapters in several states, but was most active in New York City, Chicago, and San Francisco. The group promoted itself by distributing fliers at punk rock concerts, and was supported by benefit concerts from punk bands like the Dead Kennedys, The Contractions, and Dirty Rotten Imbeciles.

== Publications ==
In 1980, the John Brown Anti-Klan Committee distributed a pamphlet entitled "Take a Stand Against the Klan", which outlined the group's "Principles of Unity":

1. Fight White Supremacy in All Its Forms! Death to the Klan! Support the Struggle of the Black Nation for Self-Determination! Support the Struggle to Free the Land!
2. Follow Black and Other Third World Leadership
3. Support the Struggle of Third World People for Human Rights! Oppose White Supremacist Attacks!

The John Brown Anti-Klan Committee published a quarterly national newsletter, originally called Death to the Klan, and later renamed No KKK, No Fascist USA!. The paper had a circulation of 10,000 and focused on issues such as the racist nature of tracking in schools, homophobia, and political prisoners. The New York chapter also published a local newsletter called Up South. In 1991 the JBAKC released a video about fascism and anti-fascism in the US entitled Behind the Burning Cross: Racism USA.

== Protests ==
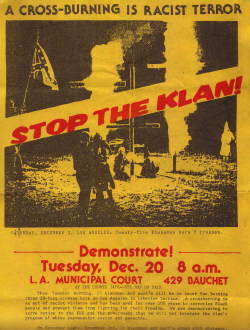
Flier distributed by the JBAKC Los Angeles chapter in 1984

The JBAKC directly confronted white supremacists when they held rallies, and the confrontations sometimes became violent. In 1983 the group worked with the Brown Berets to disrupt a KKK march in Austin, Texas. The protesters hurled rocks and bottles at the marchers, and the ensuing fights resulted in 12 injured people and 11 arrests. The Austin police chief blamed the violence on the JBAKC and Brown Berets, but one police officer was found to have used excessive force in the arrest of a Brown Beret member. Later that year, three members were arrested for participating in a riot outside an Arlington, Virginia high school, where neo-Nazis held a demonstration to mark "White Pride Day".

When a group of KKK members protested at a Gay Pride Parade in Chicago in 1986, they were met by counter-demonstrators from JBAKC and another anti-racist group. A crowd of around 2,500 Klan supporters chased the anti-Klan groups, leading to 17 arrests and minor injuries to eight police officers.

In addition to confronting white supremacists, the John Brown Anti-Klan Committee also took a stand against what they saw as police brutality. In 1983, 20 members of the Los Angeles chapter demonstrated outside the Los Angeles County Sheriff's Department to protest the shooting of a five-year-old black boy by a white police officer from the Stanton Police Department. The protesters passed out a pamphlet headlined "Stop Killer Cops!" and claimed that the officer overreacted because he felt threatened being in a black community. A police spokesperson claimed that the child had waved a realistic toy gun at the officer.

As part of their effort to challenge white supremacy, the group worked to clean up antisemitic and racist graffiti in the Lincoln Park neighborhood of Chicago. The swastikas and similar graffiti were spray-painted on the 40th anniversary of Kristallnacht, when Jewish-owned businesses across Germany were vandalized. The vandalism was attributed to William G. Leinberger, a member of the neo-Nazi group Chicago Area Skin Heads.

Despite their work opposing certain forms of antisemitism, not all Jewish groups supported the John Brown Anti-Klan Committee. At two California anti-Klan rallies, the JBAKC were confronted by protesters from the far right Jewish Defense League (JDL), who accused the group of antisemitism for their strong positions against Zionism. JDL spokesman Irv Rubin said of the Committee, "They hate Israel with a passion". The Anti-Defamation League also criticized the JBAKC, claiming that the organization "actually promotes racism and advocates organized violence." The JBAKC, for its part, referred to Zionism as "the enshrinement of white supremacy," accused Zionists of "work[ing] with the Klan and other white supremacist groups," and asserted that there was no inherent opposition between "Zionism and Nazism."

== Bombings ==
Between 1982 and 1984 a group of radical activists planted a string of bombs at military, government, and corporate targets along the East Coast to protest apartheid in South Africa and what they saw as American aggression in Central America, Grenada and Lebanon. The activists used a variety of names, such as the Armed Resistance Unit, Guerrilla Resistance, United Freedom Front, and the Revolutionary Fighting Group, but the Federal Bureau of Investigation (FBI) believed that a single group was responsible. While the John Brown Anti-Klan Committee never claimed responsibility for the bombings, three members of the group were later convicted for their participation in them. Laura Whitehorn and Marilyn Buck served long prison sentences for related crimes, and Linda Evans was released in 2001 when President Bill Clinton commuted her 40-year sentence after she had served 16 years. Five members of the JBAKC and one member of the New Movement in Solidarity with Puerto Rican Independence and Socialism were found in contempt of court for refusing to testify before a grand jury regarding the bombs planted at the U.S. Capitol and two military targets during the bombing campaign.
