= Madame Binh Graphics Collective =

A MBGC design (signature bottom-right)

The Madame Binh Graphics Collective (MBGC) was the propaganda arm affiliated with the May 19th Communist Organization in the United States. It was active from 1977 until the MBGC faded away in 1983.

== Organization and actions ==
Within a structure of collaborative authorship, the all-women collective made a stylistic range of posters, prints and street art on anti-racist subjects and in support of national liberation movements. It also taught classes in drawing, design and silk-screening. One of the collective's main goals was to provide "material aid" (as opposed to just visibility or propaganda) to the international movements it supported, so the collective often sold its work or used art to advertise its allies' meetings or actions.

Much of the collective's archive was bought in 1981, before the collective was raided by the FBI. Many of the purchased posters were donated to the Hampshire College Archive in 1991, as part of the Karen DiGia Collection. One of its best-known posters is a photograph of Assata Shakur with the text "Assata Shakur is welcome here" below. It is signed with the pseudonym "The Republic of New Afrika". The MBGC Assata Shakur poster influenced the design of Micah Bazant's 2017 poster "Refugees Are Welcome Here".

The MBGC was named after Madame Nguyễn Thị Bình, a signatory of the Paris Peace Accords in 1973 on behalf of the Provisional Revolutionary Government of the Republic of South Vietnam. The historian Lien-Hang Nguyen has argued that the MBGC was one of many US radical left groups which looked to the Vietnamese Revolution as a source of inspiration and solidarity — as an exemplar of a functioning communist politic.

Members included Mary Patten, Laura Whitehorn, Margo Pelletier, Wendy Grossman, Lisa Roth, Eve Rosahn and Donna Borup.
