= William Morales =

On the FBI Most Wanted Terrorists list

William Morales (born February 7, 1950) is a Puerto Rican member of the Fuerzas Armadas de Liberación Nacional Puertorriqueña (FALN). He was convicted in February 1979 for possession of explosives, and possession and transportation of explosives and a shotgun. He escaped from Bellevue Hospital in May 1979 and subsequently fled to Mexico, where he was held by the authorities, before emigrating to Cuba in 1988.

== Background ==
Morales grew up in East Harlem. Later he attended the School of Visual Arts in Manhattan where he earned a degree in film studies. Morales was one of the leaders of the open admissions strike against City University of New York in 1969, which protested against what was perceived as the biased admissions policy of the university, ultimately leading to CUNY becoming a majority Black-Latino university within a few years. In 1970 he became involved with FALN. After leaving college Morales worked a variety of jobs, including counselor for the Police Athletic League, lifeguard, working for TWA as a ticket agent, and drug counselor.

== Activities ==
Morales was believed to be the chief bomb maker for the Fuerzas Armadas de Liberación Nacional Puertorriqueña (FALN) and was implicated in fifty bombings between 1974 and 1978. The most deadly incident he was implicated in was the bombing of the Fraunces Tavern in New York on January 24, 1975, which killed 4 and injured more than 50. Neither Morales nor any of his associates were ever charged with this bombing. FALN were also involved in the bombing of Mobil's offices in New York in 1977 where one man was killed.

Morales was a board member of the National Commission on Hispanic Affairs (NCHA), a charity funded by the Protestant Episcopalian Church. The NCHA unwittingly helped fund FALN activities in the mid-1970s. Morales was interviewed by the FBI in March 1976, however they believed he was just an activist and wasn't considered a suspect.

== Capture ==
On the evening of July 12, 1978, Morales was constructing a pipe bomb in his flat on 96th Street in Queens. Like many of his bombs it included a timer that was set to go off at 9 o'clock. To set it, the hour hand on the wristwatch would be thinned down to ensure detonation. However, it is believed that Morales filed down the minute hand by mistake, so instead of having several hours before the bomb went off he had only a much shorter period of time. The bomb went off in his hand at 5.20, causing severe injuries. In the explosion he lost nine fingers and an eye; his jaw was fractured in at least five places and his lips were blown off. Despite his severe injuries, after regaining consciousness, Morales tried to destroy incriminating documents which linked him to FALN. He switched on the gas to his stove and waited for the emergency services and police to arrive, in the hope that an explosion would kill the police. The first firefighters to arrive immediately detected the gas and broke windows to ventilate the room.

Police found 66 sticks of dynamite and 200 pounds of explosives, described at the time as being the biggest cache of explosives ever found in New York City. Along with these, a Gestetner duplicating machine was found in Morales's apartment, which had been used to produce the FALN communique following the Fraunces Tavern bombing. Morales was taken to the Elmhurst General Hospital where he was charged with possession of explosives, and possession and transportation of explosives and a shotgun. His attorneys vigorously complained about the quality of care he was receiving, and filed a lawsuit that the police had "illegally confiscated" his fingers, which they claimed were taken as evidence. On February 28, 1979, Morales was convicted of the charges and sentenced to 99 years in prison. Following his sentencing he said, "They’re not going to hold me forever".

== Escape ==
Morales was moved from the Federal Metropolitan Correctional Center in lower Manhattan to the less secure Bellevue General Hospital on medical grounds. He was in the prison ward on the third floor of the building. With the help of physician and M19CO member Dr. Alan Berkman, Morales was able to cut through the wire mesh in his room over a couple of days. In the early hours of May 21, 1979, he constructed a rope made of elastic bandages and climbed out a bathroom window. His guard, Thomas Ryan, is believed to have fallen asleep. His rope snapped and he fell 20 feet (6.1 m), colliding with an air conditioning unit on the fall. He was met by as many as 30 members of the M19CO, FALN, and the Black Liberation Army, who had stolen a cherry picker to help him escape. M19CO member Marilyn Buck took him to a safe house in East Orange, New Jersey, where he was cared for before fleeing to Mexico. Subsequently, Morales was charged with "unlawful interstate flight to avoid prosecution for the crime of escape".

Morales' attorney Susan Tipograph was accused of assisting in the escape of Morales. Prosecutors filed affidavits that implied she had given Morales wire cutters which he used in the escape, smuggled in by being taped to her thigh under her skirt. She denied any link and has never been formally charged. New York City Department of Correction Commissioner William J. Ciuros Jr. and fifteen others were fired shortly after the escape.

== Life as a fugitive ==
Morales fled to Mexico where he remained in hiding. In 1983, following a wiretap, the FBI notified Mexican authorities that he was living in Puebla. During the attempt to arrest him a shootout took place; two of Morales' associates and a policeman were killed. Despite Morales' capture and his sentence for 12 years in prison for the killing of the policeman, US extradition requests were refused and in 1988 he was eventually released and allowed to emigrate to Cuba, much to US anger.

Morales settled in Cuba in June 1988 where he was given political asylum. He has since lived quietly in Havana, marrying and starting a family. In 1997 Morales requested amnesty from the United States, however he was not included in President Bill Clinton's 1999 clemency offer to other FALN members. Following America's resumption of diplomatic relations with Cuba in 2015, it was thought that those who had settled in Cuba such as Morales and Assata Shakur might be extradited to the United States.

Morales was depicted in David Wojnarowicz's 1984 painting William Morales, Patron Saint of Prison Breaks, which features in the New York Metropolitan Museum of Art collection. A student and community center at CUNY was opened in 1989 and named after Morales and Assata Shakur. It closed in 2013.

== See also ==
- Independence movement in Puerto Rico
