= Mutulu Shakur =

American activist and prisoner (1950–2023)

- Born: Jeral Wayne Williams; August 8, 1950; Baltimore, Maryland, U.S.
- Died: July 7, 2023 (aged 72); Mercer Island, Washington, U.S.
- Occupation: Acupuncturist
- Spouses: Afeni Shakur (m. 1975; div. 1982); Makini Hearn (m. 1982; div. 2010)
- Children: 7, including Ayize Jama-Everett, Mopreme Shakur and Tupac Shakur (stepson)
- Status: Deceased
- Convictions: Killing during the commission of a bank robbery (18 U.S.C. § 2113) (2 counts); Armed bank robbery (18 U.S.C. § 2113) (2 counts); Bank robbery (18 U.S.C. § 2113) (2 counts); Racketeering (18 U.S.C. § 1962); Conspiracy to commit racketeering (18 U.S.C. § 1962)
- Penalty: 60 years' imprisonment

FBI Ten Most Wanted Fugitive

Status
- Added: July 23, 1982
- Caught: February 12, 1986
- Number: 380
- Captured

Mutulu Shakur Sr. (born Jeral Wayne Williams; August 8, 1950 – July 7, 2023) was an American activist and member of the Black Liberation Army who, having been convicted of murder, was sentenced to sixty years in prison for his alleged involvement in a 1981 robbery of a Brinks armored truck in which a guard and two police officers were murdered.

Shakur was politically active as a teen with the Revolutionary Action Movement (RAM) and later the black separatist movement the Republic of New Afrika. He was the stepfather of rapper Tupac Shakur.

Shakur was paroled on ill-health compassionate grounds in December 2022, after serving nearly 37 years of imprisonment. Shakur died appoximately eight months later.

== Early life and activism ==
Shakur was born in Baltimore, Maryland, on August 8, 1950, as Jeral Wayne Williams. At age seven, he moved to Jamaica, Queens, New York City, with his mother, who was blind, and younger sister.

By his late teens, Shakur was politically active with the Revolutionary Action Movement (RAM) and later joined the Republic of New Afrika.

In 1970, Shakur began working with the Lincoln Detox program, which offered drug rehabilitation for heroin addiction using acupuncture an alternative to the FDA-approved drug methadone. Eventually, he became the program's assistant director and remained associated with the program until 1978. He became certified and licensed to practice acupuncture in the state of California in 1979. He went on to help found and direct the Black Acupuncture Advisory Association of North America (BAAANA) and the Harlem Institute of Acupuncture.

== Brink's robbery, arrest, and incarceration ==
Shakur was one of several Black Liberation Army members to carry out the October 1981 robbery of an armored car in Nanuet, New York. Aided by the May 19 Communist Organization and former members of the Weather Underground, the BLA crew stole $1.6 million in cash from a Brink's vehicle at the Nanuet Mall. The robbers killed Brink's guard Peter Paige and seriously wounded another, Joseph Trombino. Soon after, they killed Nyack, New York police officers Edward O'Grady and Waverly Brown, who had stopped a getaway vehicle.

Shakur, the alleged ringleader of the group, evaded capture for more than five years. Because of this he was the last one to stand trial on charges related to the robbery. In 1982, Shakur, Marilyn Buck, and others involved in the BLA and M19CO were indicted on Racketeer Influenced and Corrupt Organizations Act (RICO) charges, encompassing the Brink's robbery and other similar robberies, as well as engineering the 1979 escape from a New Jersey prison of Assata Shakur. On July 23, 1982, while still at large, he became the 380th person added to the FBI Ten Most Wanted Fugitives list.

He was arrested on February 12, 1986, in California by the FBI. An order for Shakur's release on pretrial bail was overturned by the United States Court of Appeals for the Second Circuit. Shakur and Buck were tried in 1987 and convicted on May 11, 1988. He received a 60-year sentence. The convictions and sentence were upheld on appeal.

Although federal parole was abolished in the Sentencing Reform Act of 1984, Shakur's convictions were exempt because the Act's provisions did not apply to crimes committed before November 1987. Under the rules in effect at the time of his offenses, Shakur was due for a mandatory parole determination after serving thirty of his original sixty-year sentence, which came in 2016.

However, the United States Parole Commission denied his release in 2016, 2018, and early 2022. In October 2019, Shakur renewed his quest for a reduction of sentence by applying to the sentencing court for compassionate release under the First Step Act, but relief was once again denied.

On November 10, 2022, the Parole Commission reconsidered his case and granted Shakur release on parole effective December 16, 2022, in light of his declining health. Shakur was released on that date from Federal Medical Center, Lexington, and died approximately seven months later.

== Personal life ==
In 1975, he married Afeni Shakur, the mother of Tupac. They had a daughter, Sekyiwa. They divorced in 1982.

In his later years Shakur developed several health issues including metastatic bone marrow cancer. He applied for release on compassionate grounds in 2020, but was denied by the then-90 year old judge Charles S. Haight Jr. who had originally sentenced him thirty years earlier. He was granted release on parole on compassionate grounds in December 2022. He died from the disease on July 7, 2023, at age 72, about seven months after being paroled.

== In popular culture ==
Rapper Rick Ross raps and mentions Mutulu few times on his track titled "Santorini Greece", rapping, "Mutulu wife reside in Cuba, nigga." And further again, "Mutulu Shakur, I know your dreads touching the floor, nigga".

Rapper Nas mentions Mutulu on his record "Pistols On Your Album Cover" rapping, "I'm just happy Mutulu Shakur got free, may he rest in peace, he was a warrior all of his days."

In 2017, Jamie Hector portrayed Mutulu Shakur in 2Pac's biopic, All Eyez on Me.

The docudrama series The FBI Files season 3, episode 14 ("Under Fire") was episode based on the 1981 Brink's robbery and the manhunt for Shakur.

== See also ==
- Assata Shakur
