= Robert Litt =

Robert Litt may refer to:

- Robert J. Litt, American sound engineer
- Robert S. Litt, General Counsel of the Office of the Director of National Intelligence
