= Soffiyah Elijah =

American lawyer, professor, author and social justice activist

- Education: Cornell University (BA); Wayne State University (JD)
- Occupations: Lawyer; author; social justice activist

Jill Soffiyah Elijah is an American lawyer, author and social justice activist.

== Education ==
Elijah holds a Bachelor of Arts degree from Cornell University and a Juris Doctor degree from the Wayne State University Law School in Detroit, Michigan.

== Career ==
Following law school, she worked as a supervising attorney at the Neighborhood Defender Service in Harlem, New York, and in the juvenile rights division of the New York Legal Aid Society. Beginning in 1992, she taught in the defender clinic at CUNY School of Law. She was a clinical faculty member and the director of the Criminal Justice Institute at Harvard University.

Elijah was the first black director of the Correctional Association of New York, a position she held for five years. At the Correctional Association, she worked with the Marshall Project to prosecute several guards Attica Prison for brutality against inmates. In 2016 she founded the Alliance of Families for Justice, an American organization that advocates for those with family members in prison. As a lawyer she has represented Marilyn Buck and Sundiata Acoli in court.

In 2018 she was honored with the Spirit of John Brown Freedom Award.

As an author she has written opinion pieces for the New York Daily News, The Hill, Democracy Now!, and the New York Times.
