= Mary Patten =

Chicago artist and activist

- Born: 1951 (age 74–75); Evanston, IL
- Education: University of Illinois at Chicago, Kansas City Art Institute
- Known for: Video art, writing, education
- Awards: Artadia Grant, Maker Grant, Propeller Fund Award

Mary Patten (born 1951, Evanston, IL) is a Chicago artist and activist. Her works combine writing, video installation, performance, artists' books, drawing, photography, collaboration, and activism. Her writing, lectures, videos, and artwork deal with the relationship between art and politics, visual culture, queer theory, terrorism, prisons and torture. She has an MFA from University of Illinois at Chicago (1992) and a BFA from the Kansas City Art Institute. Her videos are distributed by the Video Data Bank and she teaches at the School of the Art Institute of Chicago as an associate professor in the department of Film, Video, New Media, and Animation. She also teaches in the Visual and Critical Studies department and is currently the chair of the department of Film, Video, New Media, and Animation (2016).

== Recent exhibitions ==
- Organize Your Own: The Politics and Poetics of Self-Determination Movements, Averill and Bernard Leviton Gallery, 2016
- Mary Patten: Panel, Threewalls Gallery, Chicago, IL, 2013
- Whitewalls: Writings by Artists 1978–2008, Golden Gallery, Chicago, IL, 2012
- Opening the Blackbox: The Charge is Torture, Sullivan Galleries, Chicago, IL, 2012
- The Archival Impulse, Gallery 400, Chicago, IL, 2011

== Awards ==
- Maker Grant, 2013
- Illinois Arts Council Individual Project Grant, 2013
- Propeller Fund, 2013
- SAIC Faculty Enrichment Grant, 2010–11
- Artadia Award, 2002

== Activism ==
Mary Patten was a member of DAGMAR (Dykes and Gay Men Against Racism and Repression) that began in 1984 and evolved to become CFAR (Chicago for AIDS Rights), an activist group addressing HIV/AIDS. Patten was one of the founders of ACT UP/Chicago. She is an organizer of the Chicago Torture Justice Memorials (CTJM), aiming to seek justice for survivors of Chicago Police torture and their families. In addition to her work in the LGBTQ communities, Patten has created and curated art for the feminist movement, such as the 2014 exhibit "Bad Girls: Video Program: She Laughed When She Saw It" at the New Museum in New York City. Other projects of Patten include the Madame Binh Graphics Collective, Feel Tank Chicago, WhiteWalls, RIOT GRRRANDMAS!!!, and Bad Girls. She is also a member of the art/activist group Feel Tank Chicago.

== External links and further reading ==
- Mary Patten's Personal Web Page
- Mary Patten's writing
- Chicago Torture Justice Memorials
- Video Data Bank Profile
- Mary Patten's Faculty profile, School of the Art Institute of Chicago
- Feel Tank Chicago
- Mary Patten on Bad at Sports
- Review from Art in America Magazine by Danny Orendorff
- ACT UP Home Page
