= Cambridge Women's Center =

Non-profit in Massachusetts

The Cambridge Women's Center is a nonprofit community organization located at 46 Pleasant Street, Cambridge, Massachusetts. The center was founded in January 1972, making it the oldest continuously operating women's center in the United States. The actions leading up to its establishment are the subject of the 2016 documentary film Left on Pearl.

The Center provides services such as day programs, material assistance, resource referrals, classes, and support groups.

== History ==
The Cambridge Women's Center was founded in 1971 by a group of anti-imperialist feminists. Founders include Libby Bouvier, Judy Norris, Laura Whitehorn, Rochelle Ruthchild, Marla Erlien, and many others.

=== 888 Memorial Drive Takeover ===
On International Women's Day on Saturday, March 6, in 1971, a group of anti-imperialist feminists began a 10-day long occupation of Harvard University's 888 Memorial Drive. Following a 150-plus person rally held at the Massachusetts State House, the crowd then marched to Harvard University's campus in Cambridge to a little-used Harvard building located at 888 Memorial Drive. The group entered the building and announced their intent to occupy it, along with announcing a list of demands. In addition to demanding the development of a women's center to provide a space for the many women's organizations of Boston, the organizers also demanded that Harvard guarantee the creation of low-income housing for the Riverside community, a majority-Black community being displaced by Harvard's expansion.

The organizers of the takeover called the building the "Liberated Women's Center." Despite the lack of heat and an injunction issued to force the women to leave, the women remained in the building. The occupation came to an end when Susan Lyman, the chairwoman of the Radcliffe College Board of Trustees, offered a $5,000 donation in exchange for the vacating of the building. Although all of the group's demands were not met, the occupiers chose to accept the money, ending the occupation on March 16, 1971, ten days after first entering the building. That fall, 46 Pleasant Street was purchased with Lyman's donation and additional funds raised during the occupation, and the Cambridge Women's Center was established.

This occupation is the subject of the 2016 documentary Left on Pearl.

=== The Women's School ===
In March 1972, anti-imperialist feminists founded a free school known as The Women's School hosted by the Cambridge Women's Center. The school was operated collectively by approximately 20 women, and classes were volunteer-taught. The Women's School offered a range of courses about anti-imperialism, anti-racism, and lesbian activism, in addition to practical skills courses such as self-defense, nutrition, writing, and auto mechanics. Between 1972 and 1974, anti-imperialist feminists like Liz Horowitz, Laura Whitehorn, and others led many courses focused on Black History and Black women's history. The Women's School organizational records are held by Northeastern University.

=== A Meeting Place ===
The Women's Center has served as an important meeting place for feminist groups in Boston. Barbara Smith, Beverly Smith, and Demitia Frazier organized some of the first consciousness-raising groups, which would develop into the Combahee River Collective, at the Cambridge Women's Center.
