= Alan Berkman =

American physician and activist (1945–2009)

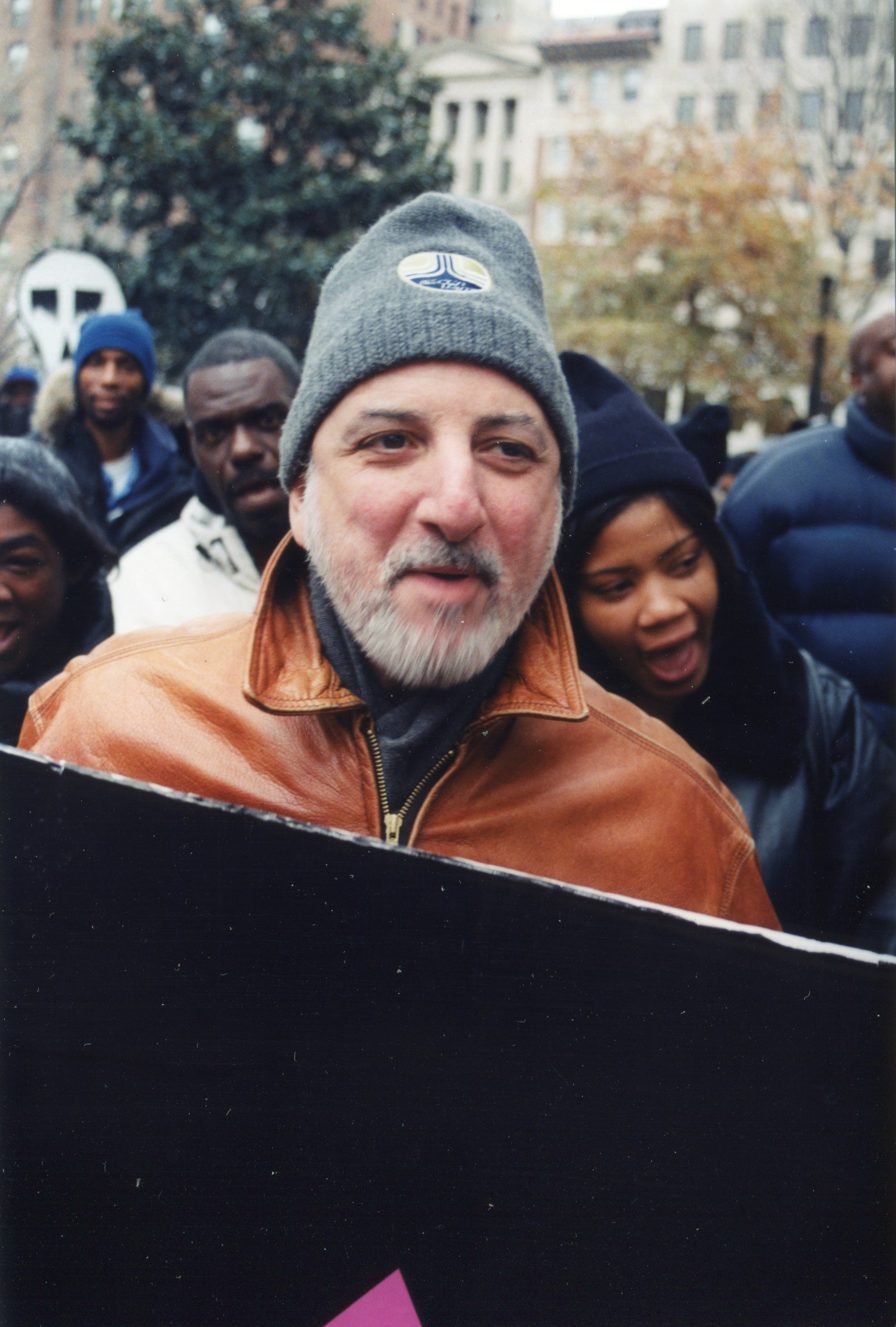
- Berkman at an ACT UP rally in 2002
- Born: 4 September 1945; Brooklyn, New York City, US
- Died: 5 June 2009 (aged 63); Manhattan, New York City, US
- Education: Cornell University (1967) Columbia University College of Physicians and Surgeons (1971)
- Occupations: doctor, activist
- Employer: Columbia University Mailman School of Public Health (2003-2009)
- Organization(s): Students for a Democratic Society, Weather Underground, Health GAP
- Criminal charges: armed robbery and possession of explosives
- Criminal penalty: 10 year sentence
- Criminal status: Released on parole in 1992 after serving 8 years
- Spouse: Barbara Zeller (m. 1975)
- Children: 2

Alan Berkman (September 4, 1945 – June 5, 2009) was an American physician and activist in the Students for a Democratic Society and Weather Underground who went to prison for his involvement in a number of robberies staged by the organizations and their offshoots. Released after eight years in prison for armed robbery and explosives possession, Berkman provided medical care to the homeless and founded Health GAP to help provide AIDS pharmaceuticals to some of the world's poorest nations.

== Early life and education ==
Berkman was born in Brooklyn and moved with his family to Middletown, Orange County, New York. His family was Jewish. He was an Eagle Scout who graduated as the salutatorian of his high school class. He earned his undergraduate degree at Cornell University, graduating as an honor student in 1967. Berkman completed his medical training at the Columbia University College of Physicians and Surgeons in 1971.

== Political and criminal activities ==
His politics and practice of medicine often overlapped, including his treatment of prisoners after the September 1971 Attica riots. He and his wife evaded the cordon established by the United States Marshals Service to provide medical care during the Wounded Knee incident in 1973.

The Black Liberation Army and May 19th Communist Movement had organized the October 20, 1981, Brinks robbery in Nanuet, New York, in which $1.6 million was taken from a Brink's armored car. An armored car guard was killed during the robbery. In a shootout shortly after the heist, two police officers were killed. A witness told a grand jury that Berkman had treated one of the holdup group's members for a gunshot wound. Berkman refused to talk and spent almost a year in jail for civil contempt. Indicted as an accessory after the fact, Berkman jumped bail and went underground. Berkman's lawyers claimed that he was the only U.S. doctor to be charged for treating a fugitive since Dr. Samuel Mudd was charged and later convicted for his medical treatment of John Wilkes Booth in 1865 after the Abraham Lincoln assassination.

On the run, Berkman took part in the gunpoint robbery of a Connecticut supermarket that netted more than $20,000. Berkman and Elizabeth Ann Duke were arrested on May 23, 1985, near Doylestown, Pennsylvania. Their car was found to have a pistol and shotgun, as well as the key to a storage site that held 100 pounds of dynamite. During his years on the run in the 1980s, court papers alleged, he was involved with groups that had staged seven bombings of military and other government facilities, though charges related to the bombings were later dismissed. He was charged as part of the Resistance Conspiracy and convicted for his participation in the supermarket robbery, the proceeds of which, prosecutors alleged, had been used to buy the dynamite.

== Prison ==
Berkman served eight years of a 10-year sentence, primarily in solitary confinement. Diagnosed with Hodgkin's in 1985, Berkman experienced delays in treatment and almost died twice due to the subpar prison healthcare system. Berkman appeared on 60 Minutes to discuss his experiences. In his 1991 testimony before the United States Congress, Berkman stated: "Security concerns are the context in which prison medicine is practiced, but it is disastrous if they become the overwhelming content." He later stated in an interview: "When you're in prison, your care is under the general supervision of people who don't much care if you live or die and that's a very hard reality."

== HIV/AIDS advocacy and research ==
After his release on parole in 1992, Berkman worked as a doctor at a South Bronx clinic for parolees who use drugs. In 1995, Berkman returned to Columbia University as a postdoctoral research fellow and treated homeless men living with HIV/AIDS and mental illness. That year he published a paper criticizing the prison health care system.

In the late 1990s, Berkman did HIV/AIDS research in South Africa.

Upon his return to New York, Berkman co-founded Health Global Access Project (Health GAP), in collaboration with ACT UP and other activists. Health GAP is an organization dedicated to expanding affordable access to antiretroviral drugs in the poorest parts of the world. Through such efforts as lobbying to allow foreign governments to impose compulsory licenses to allow local manufacture of medications without the imposition of U.S. trade tariffs, costs for a regimen of AIDS medications that had cost $15,000 annually in the late 1990s had been cut to $150 per year by the time of his death.

In 2001, Berkman published a paper advocating that the global efforts to end the HIV/AIDS epidemic should include both treatment and prevention.

In 2003, Berkman became an assistant professor of clinical epidemiology and sociomedical sciences at the Columbia University Mailman School of Public Health, later becoming vice chair of the Department of Epidemiology.

== Death ==
Over the last 20 years of his life, he faced recurring cancer. A resident of Manhattan, Berkman died there, aged 63, from lymphoma on June 5, 2009. He was survived by his wife, Dr. Barbara Zeller, as well as two daughters and a grandson. One of his daughters, Harriet Clark, was with Judith Alice Clark, a fellow member of the May 19th Communist Movement. At Barbara's suggestion, Judith had asked Berkman to donate his sperm, and he agreed. Barbara assisted with the insemination. Berkman's papers are archived at Columbia University Irving Medical Center.

In 2020, Berkman's friend, Susan M. Reverby, published Co-Conspirator for Justice: The Revolutionary Life of Dr. Alan Berkman.

== Selected works ==
- Berkman, A (1995). "Prison health: the breaking point". Am J Public Health. 85: 1616–8. doi:10.2105/ajph.85.12.1616. PMC 1615745. PMID 7503333.
- Berkman, A (2001). "Confronting global AIDS: prevention and treatment". Am J Public Health. 91: 1348–9. doi:10.2105/ajph.91.9.1348. PMC 1446774. PMID 11527751.
- Berkman, A; Garcia, J; Muñoz-Laboy, M; Paiva, V; Parker, R (2005). "A critical analysis of the Brazilian response to HIV/AIDS: lessons learned for controlling and mitigating the epidemic in developing countries". Am J Public Health. 95: 1162–72. doi:10.2105/AJPH.2004.054593. PMC 1449335. PMID 15933232.
