= 1983 United States Senate bombing =

Terror attack in Washington, DC, US

- Part of the New Communist movement and political violence in the United States during the Cold War
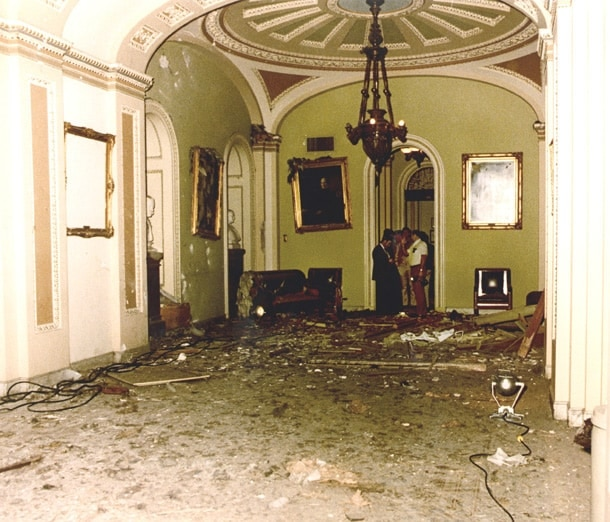
- Location: 38.89°N 77.009°W; Washington, D.C.
- Date: November 7, 1983; 10:58 pm (UTC-5)
- Target: United States Senate
- Attack type: Bombing
- Deaths: 0
- Injuries: 0
- Perpetrator: Resistance Conspiracy of the May 19th Communist Organization
- Motive: United States military involvement in Grenada and Lebanon

The 1983 U.S. Senate bombing took place at the United States Senate on November 7, 1983, as a protest against United States military involvement in Lebanon and Grenada. The attack led to heightened security in the DC metropolitan area, and the inaccessibility of certain parts of the Senate Building. Six members of the Maoist Armed Resistance Unit, also known as Resistance Conspiracy, were arrested in May 1988 and charged with the bombing, as well as related bombings of Fort McNair and the Washington Navy Yard which occurred on April 25, 1983, and April 20, 1984, respectively.

== Background ==
In October 1983, the United States invaded the island nation of Grenada and replaced the ruling Marxist–Leninist New Jewel Movement with the previous parliamentary government at the behest of Governor-General Paul Scoon. The New Jewel Movement was a Marxist–Leninist vanguard party, that had assumed power through coup d'état, and ruled the country from 1979 to 1983. The US invasion began following the violent overthrow of the nation's first socialist leader, Maurice Bishop, due to a power struggle with his Deputy Prime Minister and subsequent mass demonstrations. The invasion, coupled with US participation in a peacekeeping force in Lebanon, prompted the left-wing militant group Resistance Conspiracy to plan the Senate bombing as well as other similar attacks.

== Bombing ==
On November 7, 1983, the Senate adjourned at 7:02 p.m. For the next two hours, a well-attended reception was held near the Senate Chamber. At 10:58 p.m., there was an explosion on the second floor of the Capitol's north wing; adjacent hallways were mostly unoccupied at the time.

A few minutes before the explosion, a tape-recorded message was telephoned to The Washington Post news desk and the Capitol switchboard, claiming to represent the Armed Resistance Unit and warning that a bomb was about to be detonated near the Senate Chamber in retaliation for recent U.S. military involvement in Grenada and Lebanon. The Armed Resistance Unit also plotted to murder Henry Kissinger.

The force of the explosive device, placed beneath a bench at the eastern end of the corridor outside the chamber, blew off the door to Democratic Leader Robert C. Byrd's office. Senator Byrd was an active supporter of involvement in Grenada, and had recently made attempts to garner support for retaliating against recent attacks against U.S. Marines stationed in Lebanon. The bomb blast also tore a hole in a wall partition, sending pulverized brick and plaster into the Republican cloakroom; the cloakroom's glass windows were shattered. Major damage was done to arches, walls, and the glazed-tile floor near the blast. A grandfather clock that had been in place by the Senate chamber since 1859 was destroyed, and six paintings were ripped, shredded or damaged, including a portrait of Daniel Webster which was badly damaged. Members of the Senate recovered fragments of the painting. A conservator worked for months to restore the painting to a semblance of the original.

The explosion caused no structural damage to the Capitol. Officials calculated damages of $1,000,000.

== Resistance Conspiracy ==
The group Resistance Conspiracy was a United States–based branch of the wider communist organization known as the May 19th Communist Order. This group existed from its first attack in 1976 until later attacks in 1985. Throughout the lifespan of the organization, twenty incidents of politically motivated domestic terrorism were committed, including one murder. The organization is also known as the Armed Resistance Unit, the Red Guerilla Resistance, and the Revolutionary Fighting Group.

Earlier that year, on April 25, 1983, a small bomb was detonated at the National War College at Fort McNair in Washington, D.C. A call coming into UPI in advance of the attack mentioned "U.S. imperialism." The National War College is where American military officials get high-level training. Following the attack, it was immediately sealed off. Of the device causing the explosion, Col. Jamie Walton of the Army remarked that it "appeared to be 5 to 10 pounds of unknown explosives detonated by some sort of timing device." Colonel Walton also reported that no injuries were incurred, although there was superficial damage to the outside of the building.

A year later, on April 24, 1984, a group calling itself the Guerilla Resistance Movement took responsibility for a bombing at the Officer's Club at the Washington Navy Yard. Their reasons for the bombing were opposition to U.S. policy in Central America and independence for Puerto Rico. The explosion at the Officer's Club occurred at 1:50 AM. An FBI spokesman said it was caused by a powerful bomb placed under a couch near the club's entrance. The explosion blew out windows, knocked down part of a ceiling, and damaged the interior of the three-story, brick building. The building was vacant at the time and no one was injured.

== Aftermath ==
Within minutes of the explosion at the US Senate Building, a dozen fire trucks and four ambulances arrived at the west front of the Capitol while officers with police dogs began searching the area for clues. Witnesses attested to hearing a loud blast and seeing smoke at the Capitol. FBI officials determined that the bomb was a high-explosive device with delayed timing, consisting of sticks of dynamite with a pocket watch as a timer.

A group calling itself Armed Resistance Unit claimed responsibility for the bombing. The group mailed a recorded communique to National Public Radio stating, "We purposely aimed our attack at the institutions of imperialist rule rather than at individual members of the ruling class and government. We did not choose to kill any of them this time. But their lives are not sacred."

After a five-year investigation, federal agents arrested six members of the Armed Resistance conspiracy group on May 12, 1988: these were Marilyn Buck, Linda Evans, Laura Whitehorn, Susan Rosenberg, Timothy Blunk and Alan Berkman. An alleged seventh member of the group, Elizabeth Duke, remained a fugitive. All seven were charged with bombing the Capitol, as well as Fort McNair and the Washington Navy Yard. On December 6, 1990, federal judge Harold H. Greene sentenced Laura Whitehorn and Linda Evans to prison for conspiracy and malicious destruction of government property. The court dropped charges against three co-defendants, two of whom (including Susan Rosenberg) were serving prison sentences already for related crimes. Whitehorn was sentenced to 20 years; Evans, to 5 years, concurrent with 35 years for illegally buying guns.

On January 20, 2001, the day he left office, President Bill Clinton commuted Evans's and Rosenberg's sentences.

The area outside the Senate Chamber, previously open to the public, was permanently closed after the 1983 bombing. Congressional officials also set up a system requiring staff ID cards for entry and installed metal detectors at building entrances. These metal detectors were in addition to those already in place at the Chamber Gallery doors following a prior Capitol bombing in 1971.

== See also ==
- Attacks on the United States
- List of incidents of political violence in Washington, D.C.
- List of attacks on legislatures
- Left-wing terrorism
