= Linda Evans (activist) =

American radical leftist

Linda Sue Evans
- Born: May 11, 1947 (age 79); Fort Dodge, Iowa, U.S.
- Other names: Linda Evans, Rebecca Ann Morgan, Christine Johnson, and Louise Robinett
- Known for: SDS, Weather Underground Organization, May 19th Communist Organization

Linda Sue Evans (born May 11, 1947) is an American political activist and militant. She was convicted for activities undertaken as a member of the May 19th Communist Movement; Evans was sentenced in 1987 to 40 years in prison for using false identification to buy firearms and for harboring a fugitive in the 1981 Brinks armored truck robbery, in which two police officers and a guard were killed, and Black Liberation Army members were wounded. In a second case, she was sentenced in 1990 to five years in prison for conspiracy and malicious destruction in connection with eight bombings including the 1983 United States Senate bombing. Her sentence was commuted in 2001 by President Bill Clinton because of its extraordinary length.

== Students for a Democratic Society ==
Evans began her life as an activist by organizing demonstrations at Michigan State University during 1965. In 1967, Evans became a member of the East Coast chapter of Students for a Democratic Society (SDS). She stated that she became interested in the civil rights movement after getting attacked by police during a demonstration at the Pentagon. "When I first became a political activist, I was a pacifist. I had never experience real violence in my own life and naively hoped that it changed." Evans demonstrated her interest in anti-racism movements by supporting various groups championing Black, Native and Puerto Rican liberation causes.

Evans' leadership role in SDS began after a conference held on July 15, 1969, at John F. Kennedy Airport in New York. At this she announced that she would be traveling with six other anti-war activists to Hanoi to participate in the release of three U.S. pilots who were being held as prisoners of war. At this conference, she also read a statement from SDS which declared the organization's support for the National Liberation Front of South Vietnam. Almost a month later, on August 7, 1969, Evans returned from Hanoi along with the prisoners of war through Trans World Airlines.

Soon after Evans return from Hanoi, SDS held various conferences so that she could relate her experiences in Hanoi. During these conferences Evans stated that "SDS is on the side of North Vietnam and the National Liberation Front", called out the U.S. as the aggressor, and spoke of the "extremely humane treatment" given to captured American GIs. To conclude many of her appearances, she mentioned how willing the Vietnamese women and children were to bear arms in order to fight for their cause, and told of seeing an antiaircraft gun operated by Viet Cong women, cradling the gun in her arms and "wishing that an American plane would come over."

Two of these conferences were notable for their high attendance. One took place at St. Joseph's Episcopal Church in Detroit on August 11, 1969, while the other took place at Cleveland during the SDS National Conference held August 29 through September 1, 1969. While at the SDS national convention, Evans announced her loyalty to Communism.

In 1970, Evans was arrested for conspiracy and crossing state lines to incite a riot while organizing for SDS's National Action, more commonly known as the Days of Rage. The charges were dropped after it was disclosed that the government had used illegal wiretaps to obtain evidence. Evans was released on a $75,000 bond.

After Evans was released from prison in 1970, she moved to Texas where she continued to participate in radical causes.

== Weather Underground Organization and M19CO ==
Evans became involved in Weatherman, a group that derived from SDS. She organized and led many Weatherman actions. Following the Greenwich Village townhouse explosion that killed three Weatherman members (Ted Gold, Diana Oughton, and Terry Robbins), Evans was one of the Weatherman members who chose to go underground in 1970. During her membership in the Weather Underground Organization, Evans provided safe housing for members of the Weather Underground Organization and by providing funding for their assumed identities. She generated these funds through her participation in various robberies. Evans also participated in the May 19th Communist Movement, a group that included some former members of the Weather Underground Organization.

On April 15, 1970, Evans and Dianne Donghi were arrested for trying to forge checks using false identification. The FBI was able to arrest them because of a tip they received from Larry Grathwohl, who was working as an undercover informant for the FBI. Grathwohl's testimony was later used in Evans' final arrest by the FBI to prove that she had repeatedly been involved in illegal activities.

Evans' final arrest was on May 11, 1985, for harboring Marilyn Jean Buck, a fugitive in the 1981 Brinks armored truck robbery case, in which two police officers and a guard were murdered. At the time of her arrest, Evans was wearing a wig and glasses to disguise herself. The FBI agents obtained from her purse a Browning 9mm pistol and false documents with the name of Rebecca Ann Morgan, Christine Johnson, and Louise Robinett. The FBI was able to trace the gun to Louisiana, where Linda Evans was found to have purchased four firearms and three boxes of ammunition from three separate businesses under the false identity of Louise Robinett. Having purchased the four guns under a false identification, Evans was charged with eleven violations of the Gun Control Act of 1968. From March 16 to March 20, 1987, she was tried before a jury. Along with the eleven violations charges and housing a fugitive, she was also charged for terrorist actions after 740 pounds of dynamite were found in her apartment along with evidence of a plan to target the U.S Capitol Building, the National War College, the Navy Yard Computer Center, the Navy Yard Officers Club, Israeli Aircraft Industries, the FBI and the New York Patrolman's Benevolent Association. On March 20, 1987, she was found guilty of all charges and was sentenced to 40 years in prison.

While incarcerated at the Federal Corrections Institution in Dublin, Evans advocated for an AIDS educational program for women and lesbian inmates. She helped raise funds for the program by creating quilts and served as a peer AIDS counselor and educator. Evans advocated for inmates' rights, claiming that "When I was in jail in Louisiana we were able to win a jail house lawyer's legal suit forcing the jail to give women glasses and false teeth".

On January 20, 2001, President Bill Clinton commuted Evans' sentence, commuting her 40-year sentence to the 16-years already served.

== Life since prison ==
Along with her partner, Eve Goldberg, Evans travels around the United States advocating for lesbian and female inmates' rights. Evans is involved with the activist organization the Center for Third World Organizing. In March 2002, she helped convene a conference with other formerly incarcerated people, entitled "Tear Down the Walls," in an attempt to gain support for giving amnesty to people she identified as political prisoners, claiming that "These political prisoners of war are women and men incarcerated because of their involvement in political activities which challenged the unjust nature of the U.S socioeconomic system." In 2003, Evans gave an interview in which she identified her sexuality as an influence for her political activities, stating that "Being a lesbian has always been an important part of the reasons why I am a revolutionary – even before I was self-conscious about how important this is to me" and "Because I experience real oppression as a lesbian and as a woman, I am personally committed from the very core of being to winning liberation for women, lesbians, and all oppressed people."

== Writings ==
- The Prison Industrial Complex and the Global Economy, with Eve Goldberg ISBN 9781604860436
- Statement from Women Political Prisoners on the Takeover of KPFA, July 14, 1999

== See also ==
- Bill Clinton pardons controversy
- Underground, documentary film
- Weather Underground Organization
- May 19th Communist Organization
- List of Weatherman actions
