= Robert S. Litt =

American lawyer

- Education: Harvard University (BA); Yale University (MA, JD)
- Occupation: Attorney

Robert S. Litt was the second General Counsel of the Office of the Director of National Intelligence (ODNI); the U.S. Senate confirmed his nomination by unanimous consent on June 25, 2009.

== Early life ==
Litt graduated from Harvard College with a Bachelor of Arts; he earned a Master of Arts and Juris Doctor from Yale University.

== Career ==
Litt clerked for Judge Edward Weinfeld of the Southern District of New York and Justice Potter Stewart of the U.S. Supreme Court. From 1978 to 1984, he was an Assistant U.S. Attorney for the Southern District of New York. In 1983 Litt prosecuted one of the trials resulting from the Brink's robbery (1981) by the Black Liberation Army. He also spent one year as a special advisor to the Assistant Secretary of State for European and Canadian Affairs.

From 1994 to 1999, Litt worked at the Department of Justice where he served as Deputy Assistant Attorney General in the Criminal Division and then as the principal associate deputy attorney general. His duties at DOJ included Foreign Intelligence Surveillance Act applications, covert action reviews, computer security and other national security matters.

Before joining the ODNI, Litt was a partner with the law firm of Arnold and Porter since 1999. He served as a member of the governing body of the American Bar Association's Criminal Justice Section and a member of the Advisory Committee to the Standing Committee on Law and National Security.

== See also ==
- List of law clerks for the eighth seat of the Supreme Court of the United States
