= Susan Rosenberg =

American activist

Susan Lisa Rosenberg (born October 5, 1955) is an American activist, writer, advocate for social justice and prisoners' rights. From the late 1970s into the mid-1980s, Rosenberg was active in the Leftist May 19th Communist Organization ("M19CO") which, according to a contemporaneous FBI report, "openly advocate[d] the overthrow of the U.S. Government through armed struggle and the use of violence". The organization's actions primarily consisted of providing political and material support for wars of national liberation, outside and within U.S. borders.

After living in clandestinity for three years, Rosenberg was arrested in 1984 while in possession of a large cache of explosives and firearms, including automatic weapons. She had also been sought as an accomplice in the 1979 prison escape of Assata Shakur and in the 1981 Brink's robbery that resulted in the deaths of two police officers and a guard, although she was never charged in either case. After trial on the weapons charges, she was sentenced to 58 years' imprisonment. Rosenberg spent 16 years in prison, during which she became a poet, author, and AIDS activist. Her sentence was commuted to time served by President Bill Clinton on January 20, 2001, his final day in office.

== Early life ==
Rosenberg was born into a middle-class Jewish family in Manhattan. Her father was a dentist and her mother a theatrical producer. She attended the progressive Walden School and later went to Barnard College at Columbia University. She left Barnard and became a drug counselor at Lincoln Hospital in The Bronx, eventually becoming licensed in the practice of Chinese medicine and acupuncture. She also worked as an anti-drug counselor and acupuncturist at health centers in Harlem, including the Black Acupuncture Advisory of North America.

== Activism and imprisonment ==
In an interview with the radio show Democracy Now, Rosenberg said that she was "totally and profoundly influenced by the revolutionary movements of the '60s and '70s". She became active in feminist causes, and worked in support of the Puerto Rican independence movement and the fight against the FBI's COINTELPRO program. Rosenberg joined the May 19th Communist Organization, a female-led clandestine group working in support of the Black Liberation Army and its offshoots (including assistance in armored truck robberies), the Weather Underground and other revolutionary organizations. Rosenberg was charged with a role in bombings at the U.S. Capitol, the U.S. National War College and the New York Patrolmen's Benevolent Association building, but these charges were dropped as part of a plea deal by other members of her group.

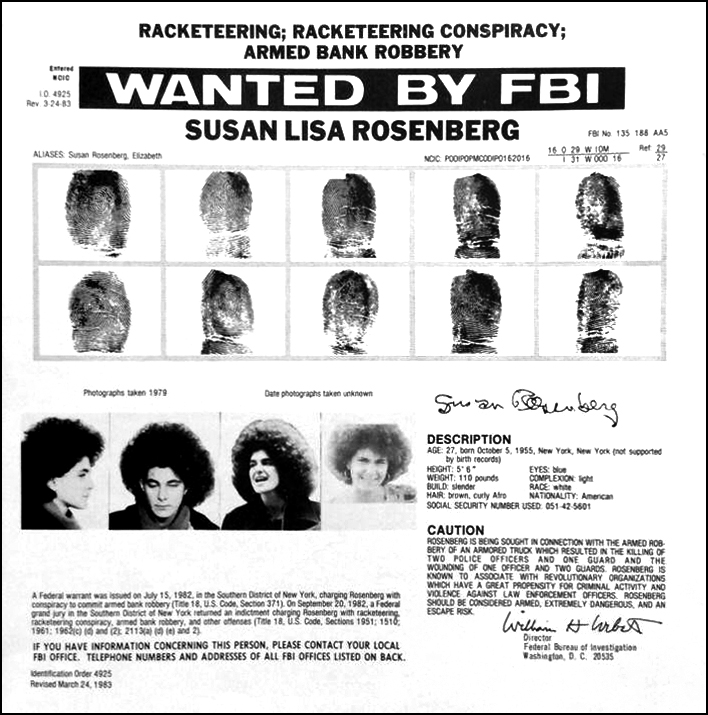
Susan Rosenberg FBI Wanted Poster

Arrested in November 1984 for possession of over 750 lbs of explosives, after three years underground following the Brink's robbery, Rosenberg was convicted in March 1985 by a federal jury in New Jersey and given a 58-year-sentence. Supporters said this was sixteen times the national average for such offenses. Her lawyers contended that, had the case not been politically charged, Rosenberg would have received a five-year sentence.

Rosenberg was one of the first two inmates of the High Security Unit (HSU), an isolation unit in the basement of the Federal Correctional Institution (currently the Federal Medical Center) in Lexington, Kentucky. Allegations were made that the unit was an experimental underground political prison that practiced isolation and sensory deprivation. The women were subject to 24-hour camera surveillance and frequent strip searches, and were given only limited access to visitors or to exercise. After touring the unit, the American Civil Liberties Union denounced it as a "living tomb", and Amnesty International called it "deliberately and gratuitously oppressive". After a lawsuit was brought by the ACLU and other organizations, the unit was ordered closed by a federal judge in 1988 and the prisoners transferred to regular cells.

Rosenberg was transferred to various prisons around the country, including FCI Coleman, Florida, FCI Dublin, California and, finally, FCI Danbury, Connecticut. In prison, she devoted herself to writing and to AIDS activism, and obtained a master's degree from Antioch University. Speaking at a 2007 forum, Rosenberg said that writing "became the mechanism by which to save my own sanity". She added that she began writing partly because the intense isolation of prison was threatening to cut her off completely from the real world and that she did not want to lose her connection to that world.

== Release ==
Rosenberg's sentence was commuted by President Bill Clinton on January 20, 2001, his last day in office, to the more than 16 years' time served. Her commutation produced a wave of criticism by police and New York elected officials.

After her release, Rosenberg became the communications director for the American Jewish World Service, an international development and human rights organization, based in New York City. She also continued her work as an anti-prison activist, and taught literature at John Jay College of Criminal Justice, in Midtown Manhattan, New York City. After teaching for four semesters there as an adjunct instructor, the CUNY administration, responding to political pressure, forced John Jay College to end its association with Rosenberg, and her contract with the school was allowed to expire without her being rehired.

In 2004, Hamilton College offered her a position to teach a for-credit month-long seminar, "Resistance Memoirs: Writing, Identity and Change". Some professors, alumni and parents of students objected and as a result of the ongoing protests, she declined the offer.

As of 2020, Rosenberg serves as vice chair of the board of directors of Thousand Currents, a non-profit foundation that raises funds and provides institutional support for grassroots groups, particularly in the Global South.

== Writing ==
In 2011, Rosenberg published a memoir of her time in prison called, An American Radical: A Political Prisoner In My Own Country. Kirkus Reviews said of the book, "Articulate and clear-eyed, Rosenberg's memoir memorably records the struggles of a woman determined to be the agent of her own life."

- Rosenberg, Susan (2011). An American Radical: A Political Prisoner In My Own Country. New York: Kensington Publishing Corp. ISBN 978-0806533049.

== See also ==
- Bill Clinton pardon controversy
- List of people pardoned or granted clemency by the president of the United States
- Prison abolition movement
- Terrorism in the United States
