= May 19th Communist Organization =

US-based, self-described revolutionary organization

- Leaders: Elizabeth Ann Duke; Kathy Boudin; Judith Alice Clark; Laura Whitehorn
- Dates active: 1978–1985
- Active regions: United States
- Ideology: Marxism–Leninism; Anti-capitalism; Anti-racism; Anti-imperialism; Anti-sexism
- Political position: Far-left
- Wars: the Black Power movement and New Communist Movement

The May 19th Communist Organization, also variously referred to as the May 19 Coalition, May 19 Communist Coalition, or M19CO, was a US-based far-left group, formed by members of the Weather Underground Organization. The group was originally known as the New York chapter of the Prairie Fire Organizing Committee (PFOC), an organization devoted to promoting the causes of the Weather Underground legally, as part of the Prairie Fire Manifesto's change in Weather Underground Organization strategy, which demanded both aboveground mass movements and clandestine organizations. The role of the clandestine organization would be to build the "consciousness of action" and prepare the way for the development of a people's militia. Concurrently, the role of the mass movement, the above-ground Prairie Fire Collective, would include the support for and the encouragement of armed action. Such an alliance would, according to Weather, "help create the 'sea' for the guerrillas to swim in." The M19CO name was derived from the birthdays of Ho Chi Minh and Malcolm X. The May 19 Communist Organization was active from 1978 to 1985. M19CO was a combination of the Black Liberation Army and the Weather Underground. It also included members of the Black Panthers, White Panthers, and the Republic of New Afrika (RNA).

In addition to the May 19th Communist Organization being made up of the Black Liberation Army, the group was formed because of infighting in the Weather Underground Organization. Following the split of the Weather Underground Organization into factions, the faction that favored more extreme actions to achieve its objectives joined the Black Liberation Army, forming the May 19th Communist Organization. One of the founders, Laura Whitehorn, was also part of the Weather Underground Organization's predecessor, the Students for a Democratic Society. In addition to being known as the May 19th Communist Organization and the New York chapter of the Prairie Fire Organizing Committee, the group was also known as the Armed Resistance Movement, the Red Guerilla Resistance, Resistance Conspiracy, and Revolutionary Fighting Group. Despite these other monikers, the group was most popularly known as the May 19th Communist Organization, predicated on May 19th being the birthday of both Malcolm X and Ho Chi Minh.

== Objectives ==
This alliance between the Weather Underground and the Black Liberation Army had three objectives:

- Free political prisoners in US prisons
- Appropriate capitalist wealth (armed robberies) to fund the third stage, and
- Initiate a series of bombings and terrorist attacks

The group also had the broader goal of violently toppling established power in the United States. These goals were aimed at the eventual goal of transforming the political landscape in the United States from one of capitalism to one of communism. This regime change was predicated on the idea that capitalism oppressed the public, particularly those that were imprisoned under the capitalist system, believing that such actions could not be undertaken in the American political system.

== Activities ==
From 1982 to 1985 M19CO committed a series of bombings, including bombings of the National War College, the Washington Navy Yard Computing Center, the Israeli Aircraft Industries Building, New York City's South African consulate, the Washington Navy Yard Officers' Club, New York City's Patrolmen's Benevolent Association, and the United States Capitol Building. Three officers were killed during the Brinks Robbery, but no one was injured or killed in their bombings. Almost all the M19CO members were convicted in a US Court of Law for these offenses, but Elizabeth Ann Duke remains at large.

- In 1979 three members walked into the visitor's center at the Clinton Correctional Facility for Women near Clinton, took two guards hostage, and freed Assata Shakur, a member of the Black Liberation Army. Shakur was serving a sentence of life plus 26 to 33 years for the murder of a state trooper.
- Several months later they arranged for the escape of William Morales, a member of the Puerto Rican separatist group, the Fuerzas Armadas de Liberación Nacional Puertorriqueña (FALN), from Bellevue Hospital in New York City where he was recovering after a bomb he was building exploded in his hands.
- In 1981 Weather Underground members Kathy Boudin, Judith Alice Clark, and David Gilbert, together with several members of the Black Liberation Army, participated in the robbery of a Brinks armored car at the Nanuet Mall, near Nyack, New York, during which a Brinks guard and two Nyack police officers were killed. Upon her arrest Boudin was identified as a member of the May 19 Communist Organization. The attack resulted in the theft of $1.6 million, intended to create an ethnostate for black Americans in the south, termed "New Afrika."
- On January 28, 1983, M19CO bombed the federal building on Staten Island, N.Y.
- On April 25, 1983, the group was responsible for a bombing at the National War College at Fort McNair in Washington, D.C.
- On November 7, 1983, the group triggered a bomb explosion at the US Senate.
- On August 18, 1983, it bombed the Washington Navy Yard Computer Center.
- On April 5, 1984, it bombed the Israeli Aircraft Industries Building.
- On April 20, 1984, M19CO committed a bombing at the Washington Navy Yard Officers Club.
- On September 26, 1984, the South African consulate was bombed.
- On November 3, 1984, two members of the M19CO, Susan Rosenberg and Timothy Blunk, were arrested at a mini-warehouse they had rented in Cherry Hill, New Jersey. Police recovered more than 100 blasting caps, nearly 200 sticks of dynamite, more than 100 cartridges of gel explosive, and 24 bags of blasting agent from the warehouse.
- M19CO's last bombing was on February 23, 1985, at the Policemen's Benevolent Association in New York City.

== Arrests ==
By May 23, 1985, all members of the group had been arrested, with the exception of Elizabeth Duke, who remains a fugitive. Alleged rioter Donna Joan Borup was arrested after tossing a caustic substance in a Port Authority of New York and New Jersey Police officer's eye during a riot at the New York John F. Kennedy International Airport. The officer, Evan Goodstein, was left with permanent vision impairment. Borup was arrested after the incident, however failed to appear at trial and is currently wanted by the FBI. Donna Borup "is thought to have a photographic memory and is highly intelligent," according to the FBI.

Marilyn Jean Buck was arrested in 1985 and was, prior to joining the May 19th Communist Organization, the only white member of the Black Liberation Army, one of the two groups that formed the May 19th Communist Organization. While the May 19th Communist Organization was made up of individuals of several racial heritages, the Black Liberation Army was previously entirely made up of black Americans, save for Marilyn Jean Buck.

On October 20, 1981, Judith Clark was arrested in connection to the attack on the armored Brinks truck. Clark was the spokesperson of the May 19th Communist Organization as of 1978, and was previously a member of one of the May 19th Communist Organization's predecessor groups, the Prairie Fire Organizing Committee. Judith Clark was released on May 10, 2019, 37 years after she was arrested on the same day as the robbery of the armored Brinks truck.

== Impact ==
The May 19th Communist Organization, along with other domestic terrorist organizations like the United Freedom Front and the Aryan Nations, are noted as having advanced the FBI's strategy and capacity to investigate domestic terrorism in the United States.

In 1982, FBI director William H. Webster reported to the Senate Subcommittee on Security and Terrorism that the Justice Department was relaxing rules that allowed the FBI to keep surveillance on domestic terrorist groups, inspired by the actions of the May 19th Communist Organization, as well as the Socialist Workers Party, the Progressive Labor Party, and the May 19th Communist Organization's predecessor group, the Weather Underground Organization. These new guidelines were aimed at repressing domestic terrorist organizations while not curtailing legitimate political protest and dissent.

== See also ==
- Anti-Imperialist Cell
- Red Army Faction
