= 1981 Brink's robbery =

Armored car theft in Nanuet, New York

Coordinates: 41.096°N 74.016°W

- Location: Nanuet, New York, US
- Date: October 20, 1981
- Target: Brink's armored car
- Attack type: Robbery, shooting, shootout
- Weapons: M16 assault rifles, shotguns
- Deaths: 3
- Injuries: 3
- Perpetrators: Black Liberation Army; May 19th Communist Organization

On October 20, 1981, several members of the Black Liberation Army (BLA) and the May 19th Communist Organization (M19CO, a successor organization of the Weather Underground) stole $1.6 million in cash from a Brink's armored car at Nanuet Mall in Nanuet, New York, killing three people. The plan called for the BLA members – including Kuwasi Balagoon, Sekou Odinga, Mtayari Sundiata, Samuel Brown and Mutulu Shakur – to carry out the robbery, with the M19CO members – David Gilbert, Judith Alice Clark, Kathy Boudin, and Marilyn Buck – serving as getaway drivers in switchcars. During the robbery, the group killed Brink's guard Peter Paige, seriously wounded Brink's guard Joseph Trombino, and slightly wounded Brink's truck driver and guard, James Kelly. Resisting arrest during the getaway, the robbers killed two Nyack police officers, Edward O'Grady and Waverly Brown, and seriously wounded Police Detective Artie Keenan. The perpetrators were arrested – some at the scene and others later – and upon conviction received lengthy prison sentences of up to life imprisonment.

== Robbery ==
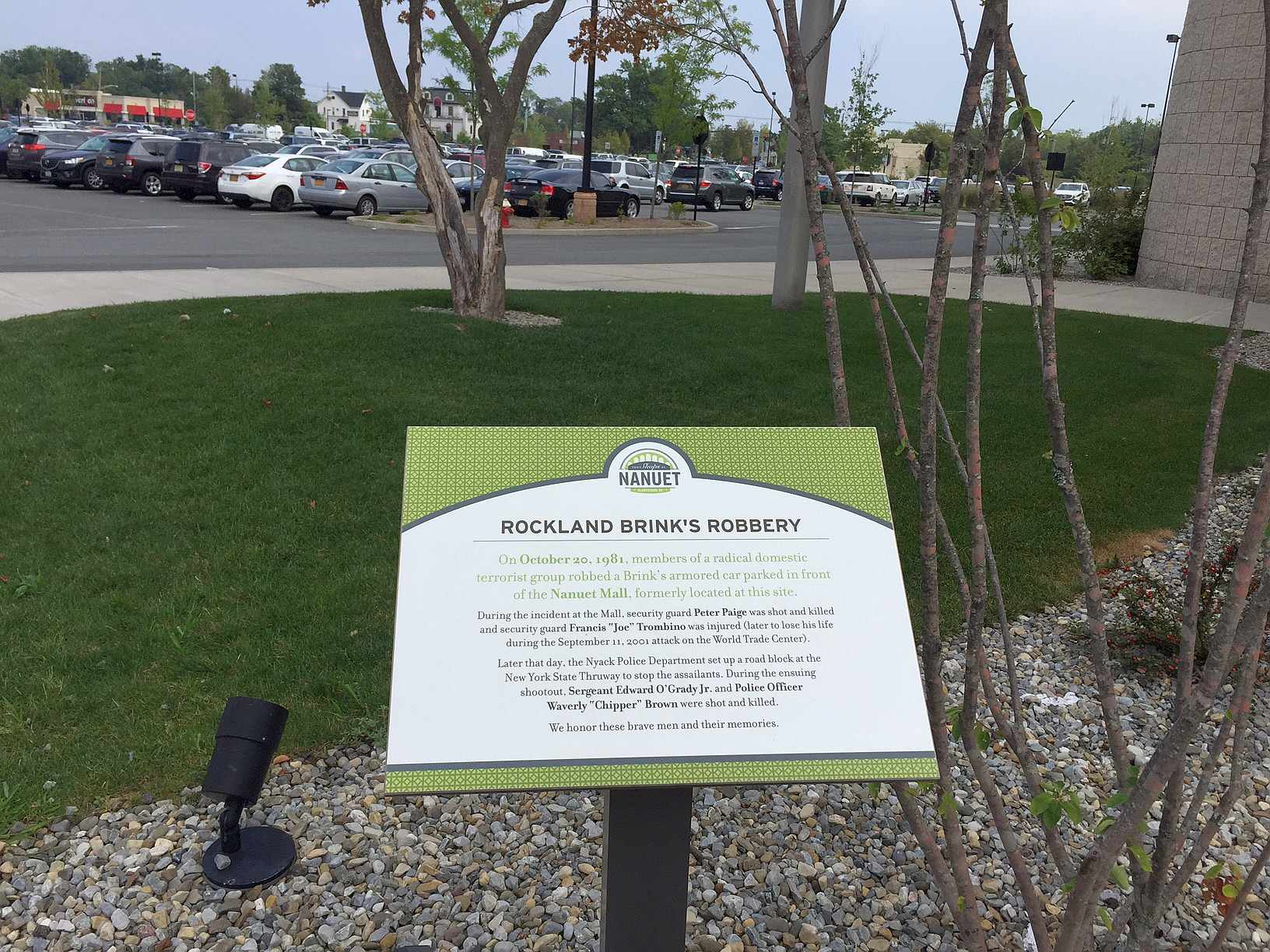
A memorial sign commemorating those who lost their lives erected at the location of the Brink's armored truck robbery

Kathy Boudin began by dropping off her infant son, Chesa Boudin, at a babysitter's before taking the wheel of the getaway vehicle, a U-Haul truck. She waited in a nearby parking lot as her heavily armed accomplices drove a red van to the Nanuet Mall, where a Brink's truck was making a pick-up.

At 3:55 p.m., Brink's guards Peter Paige and Joseph Trombino emerged from the mall carrying bags of money. As they loaded the money into the truck, the robbers stormed out of their van and attacked. One fired two shotgun blasts into the truck's bulletproof windshield, while another opened fire with an M16 rifle. Paige was hit multiple times in the chest and killed instantly. Trombino was able to fire a single shot from his handgun, but was struck in the shoulder and arm by several rounds, nearly severing his arm from his body. The truck's driver, James Kelly, noticing the shooting behind him, fired several rounds at the robbers through a gun port on the door of his truck, but came under heavy gunfire, and took cover underneath the dashboard, but he was hit in the head by glass and bullet fragmentation. The assailants grabbed $1.6 million in cash (equivalent to $5.7 million in 2025), got back in their van, and fled the scene.

Trombino survived his injuries, and continued to work for the Brink's company for the next 20 years; he was almost killed in the 1993 World Trade Center bombing and was killed in the September 11, 2001, attacks while making a delivery in the World Trade Center North Tower.

== Car swap and second gunfight ==
After fleeing the scene, the robbers drove to the parking lot where a yellow Honda and the U-Haul truck, operated by members of the May 19 Communist Organization, were waiting. The robbers quickly threw the bags of money into the car and truck and sped away. In a house across the street, Sandra Torgersen, an alert college student, spotted them as they switched vehicles and called the police.

Meanwhile, police units from all over the county were converging on the mall where the shootout occurred and attempting to cut off all possible escape routes. Soon, police officers Edward O'Grady, Waverly Brown, Brian Lennon, and Artie Keenan spotted and pulled over the U-Haul truck, with Boudin in the front seat, along with the yellow Honda at an entrance ramp to the New York State Thruway off New York State Route 59. The police were not sure if they had the right truck, since it had been reported that the robbers were all black, while the occupants of this vehicle were white (a deliberate part of the original plan by the robbers, hoping to fool the police). Since the truck matched the description of the getaway vehicle they were looking for, the officers pulled it over and approached with guns drawn.

The police officers who caught them testified that Boudin, feigning innocence, pleaded with them to put down their guns and convinced them to drop their guard; Boudin said she remained silent, that the officers relaxed spontaneously. After the police lowered their guns, six men armed with automatic weapons and wearing body armor emerged from the back of the truck and began firing upon the four police officers. Officer Brown managed to fire two or three rounds at the robbers before he was hit repeatedly by rifle rounds and collapsed on the ground. One robber then walked up to his prone body and fired several more shots into him with a 9mm handgun, ensuring his death. Keenan was shot in the leg, but managed to duck behind a tree and return fire. Officer O'Grady lived long enough to empty his revolver, but as he reloaded, he was shot several times with an M16. Ninety minutes later, he died on a hospital operating table. Meanwhile, Lennon, who was in his cruiser when the shootout began, tried to exit out the front passenger door, but O'Grady's body was wedged up against the door. He watched as the suspects jumped back into the U-Haul and sped directly towards him. Lennon fired his shotgun several times at the speeding truck as it collided with his police car, then fired two rounds from his pistol.

The occupants of the U-Haul scattered, some climbing into the yellow Honda, others carjacking nearby motorist Norma Hill while Boudin attempted to flee on foot. An off-duty corrections officer, Michael J. Koch, apprehended her shortly after the shootout. When she was arrested, Boudin gave her name as Barbara Edson.

== Arrests ==
Clark (with Gilbert and Brown in the car) crashed the Honda while making a sharp turn, injuring Brown's neck, and knocking his handgun onto the floor of the car. South Nyack police chief Alan Colsey was the only officer initially at the scene of the crash, but managed to hold them at gunpoint until Orangetown Police Officer Michael Seidel and Rockland County District Attorney's Office Detective Jim Stewart arrived. After the trio were arrested, police found $800,000 from the robbery and the 9mm handgun on the floor of the back seat of the car.

Police traced the license plate on one of the getaway vehicles, a white Buick, to an apartment in East Orange, New Jersey. There, the police found weapons, bomb-making materials, and detailed blueprints of six Manhattan police precincts. Investigation later revealed the apartment was rented by Marilyn Jean Buck, who had been previously arrested for providing weapons to the Black Liberation Army. She had been sentenced to 10 years in prison, but in 1977, she was granted furlough and never returned.

While at the apartment, police also found papers that listed an address in Mt. Vernon, New York, a small city in Westchester County about 20 miles from the mall where the robbery occurred. When police raided that apartment, they found bloody clothing, ammunition, more guns, and ski masks. Investigation later revealed that the bloody clothing belonged to Buck, who had accidentally shot herself in the leg when she tried to draw her weapon during the shootout with the police.

All of the license plates on the vehicles seen near the Mt. Vernon address were entered into the NCIC system. Three days later, NYPD Detective Lt. Dan Kelly spotted a 1978 Chrysler with a license plate that had been seen at the Mt. Vernon apartment and called for backup. The vehicle, occupied by Sundiata and Odinga, fled from the police when officers (Kelly, Detectives Irwin Jacobson and George Alleyne; Officers George Santori, Edward Johnson and Lawrence DiTusa; New York City Police Department Emergency Service Unit Officers John Russell and Alan Cochran) tried to pull them over. After the vehicle crashed, the two occupants engaged the police in a gunfight that left Sundiata dead (shot in the neck and face by Detective Irwin Jacobson), and Odinga captured by Officers Alan Cochran, Edward Johnson, and Lawrence DiTusa. Inside Sundiata's shirt pocket, police found a crushed .38 caliber slug they believe was fired from O'Grady's service weapon. Three more participants, including Balagoon, were arrested several months later.

The investigation for the participants in the robbery would continue for years. Buck was arrested in 1985. The last person to be arrested was Shakur, accused as the ringleader of the robbery, in 1986.

== Trials and sentencing ==
=== Gilbert, Balagoon and Clark ===
Gilbert, Kuwasi Balagoon and Clark were the first of the accused to go to trial. Upon a motion by the defense, the trial was transferred from Rockland County to Orange County due to concerns regarding the partiality of the juror pool in Rockland. Because the BLA was known for attempting to break their members out of prison (as in the case of Assata Shakur), massive security precautions were undertaken at the Orange County Surrogate's Court in Goshen, New York.

The defendants elected to proceed pro se. Throughout the trial, they repeatedly disrupted the proceedings by shouting anti-US slogans, proclaiming to be "at war" with the government and refusing to respect any aspect of the US legal system. They called the robbery an "expropriation" of funds that was needed to form a new country in a few select southern states that ideally would be populated only by African Americans.

When it came time for the defendants to present their case, they called only one witness, Sekou Odinga, who had already been convicted of multiple bank robberies. He said that his organization was "fighting for the liberation and self-determination of black people in this country." Odinga testified that the killings were suitable because the three victims had interfered with the "expropriation." In his view, the theft of money was morally justified because those funds "were robbed through the slave labor that was forced on them and their ancestors". After his testimony, he was praised by the defendants and led out of the courtroom to serve his 40-year federal prison sentence. The jury was not convinced by Odinga's reasoning and at the end of the trial, it took the jury only four hours of deliberation to return a verdict convicting all three defendants of armed robbery and three counts of murder. When the verdict was announced, Clark, Gilbert, and Balagoon refused to appear in court. They remained in the basement holding cells, drinking coffee and railing against what they perceived to be a racist court system. "I don't think any interest is served by forcing them to be here," said Judge Ritter.

Rockland County D.A. Kenneth Gribetz told reporters: "Our goal is to see that these people, who have contempt for society and have shown no remorse, will never see the streets of society again." On October 6, 1983, Judge Ritter sentenced each defendant to three consecutive twenty-five years to life sentences, making them eligible for parole in the year 2058. After the trial, Balagoon claimed, "As to the seventy five years in prison, I am not really worried, not only because I am in the habit of not completing sentences or waiting on parole or any of that nonsense but also because the State simply isn't going to last seventy-five or even fifty years." He died in prison from AIDS in 1986.

In September 2006, Clark was granted a new trial by a judge (Shira Scheindlin) in a district court on grounds that she had no representation at trial. On January 3, 2008, the United States Court of Appeals for the Second Circuit, in a unanimous decision, reversed the district court's judgment granting a new trial. The Second Circuit panel noted that she chose to represent herself and defaulted any claim by failing to appeal until after the time for appeals had expired. In December 2016, Andrew Cuomo commuted Clark's sentence to 35 years, citing "exceptional strides in self-development". She was denied parole in April 2017. Her parole was granted on April 17, 2019.

Gilbert was granted clemency by outgoing New York Governor Andrew Cuomo on August 23, 2021, reducing his minimum period of parole-ineligibility from 75 years to the 40 years he had served. In October 2021, the New York parole board granted Gilbert's request for parole, as of late November 2021. Gilbert spent 40 years in prison. He was 77 at his time of release.

=== Boudin and Brown ===
Boudin's and Brown's trial was moved to Westchester County on motion of the defense though Orange County David S. Ritter continued to preside over the matter. Rockland County continued to foot the bill for the trials despite their transfers from county to county. By December 1983, Rockland County had spent $1 million (equivalent to $3.23 million in 2025) on the trials and Westchester County Executive Andrew P. O'Rourke estimated that it would likely cost up to another $5 million (equivalent to $16.16 million in 2025) to prosecute the case to its conclusion, due in large part to extra security precautions, including building alterations.

Boudin hired Leonard Weinglass to defend her. Weinglass, a law partner of Boudin's father, arranged for a plea bargain and Boudin pleaded guilty to one count of felony murder and robbery, in exchange for a single twenty year-to-life sentence. She was paroled in 2003. However, Brown was unable to reach any deal that would spare him a life sentence. Since he had nothing to lose by going to trial, he decided to have one. At his trial, he claimed to have only had a minor participation in the robbery and had not fired a weapon at anyone. The jury was not convinced. In addition to being caught in the escape attempt with the other robbers, witnesses identified him as a participant in both shootouts. He was sentenced to 75 years to life in prison.

In August 1993, the Second Circuit denied Brown's new petition for a writ of habeas corpus.

=== Buck and Shakur ===
Buck was later convicted of multiple charges related to the Brink's robbery and other crimes and sentenced to 50 years in a federal prison. Mutulu Shakur, the alleged ringleader of the group, was the last to go on trial on charges related to the robbery. In 1988, he received a 60-year prison sentence. Shakur and Buck's federal convictions were affirmed by the Second Circuit in October 1989.

Buck was released from prison in July 2010, and died of cancer in August 2010. Shakur was denied parole release in 2016, again in 2018, and in early 2022. On November 10, 2022, the United States Parole Commission granted him parole effective December 16, 2022, in light of his terminal bone cancer. Having been arrested in early 1986, Shakur at the time of his parole had served nearly 37 years. Shakur died on July 6, 2023.

=== Odinga, Baraldini, Joseph and Ferguson ===
In a 1983 federal trial presided over by U.S. District Judge Kevin Duffy, Sekou Odinga and Silvia Baraldini were convicted of conspiracy and racketeering related to the robberies, Jamal Joseph and Cecil Ferguson were convicted as accessories, while two additional defendants were acquitted. That trial was prosecuted by Robert S. Litt, while the defendants' lawyers included Chokwe Lumumba and Lynne Stewart.

Ferguson, Baraldini, and Odinga's federal convictions were affirmed by the United States Court of Appeals for the Second Circuit in March 1985.

== Legacy ==
In 2004, the Nyack post office was officially renamed after the two police officers and the Brink's guard who were killed in the shootout. In 2008, five years after her release on parole, Kathy Boudin (having earned a doctorate in the interim) was appointed as an adjunct professor at Columbia University School of Social Work, prompting a 2013 Orangetown Town Board condemnation of the university's action and a call for her termination as professor. In 2019, Boudin and Gilbert's son, Chesa, who was dropped off to a babysitter before the robbery, was elected District Attorney for the city of San Francisco.
