= Marilyn Buck =

American feminist poet and activist (1947–2010)

- Undated photo of Buck
- Born: Marilyn Jean Buck; December 13, 1947; Midland, Texas, US
- Died: August 3, 2010 (aged 62); Brooklyn, New York, US
- Education: New College of California
- Occupations: Marxist, poet

Marilyn Jean Buck (December 13, 1947–August 3, 2010) was an American Marxist, feminist poet, and anti-war, anti-imperialist, and anti-racist activist, who was imprisoned for her participation in the 1979 prison escape of Assata Shakur, the 1981 Brink's robbery, and the 1983 U.S. Senate bombing. Buck received an 80-year sentence, which she served in federal prison, from where she published numerous articles as well as poetry. She was released on July 15, 2010, less than a month before her death at age 62 from cancer.

== Early life and education ==
Buck was born December 13, 1947, in Temple, Texas, to Virginia Buck, a nurse, and Louis Buck, an Episcopal minister. Her family was active in the civil rights movement. Louis Buck opposed segregation at St. Andrew's Episcopal School in Austin, Texas, picketed, and harshly criticized the bishop. In response, crosses were burned on the family's lawn, and he was removed as minister from the congregation of St. James in Austin, a congregation which had been integrated by the previous clergyman and his family. Louis Buck returned to his veterinarian career, from which he had entered the clergy, to support his family.

Marilyn Buck attended the University of California at Berkeley and the University of Texas at Austin. She subsequently earned a master's degree in Poetics from New College.

== 1960s and 70s activism ==
At the University of Texas, Buck was involved in organizing against the Vietnam War, as well as anti-racist activities. She joined Students for a Democratic Society (SDS) and worked with Austin's underground newspaper, The Rag. In 1967, Buck moved to Chicago where she edited SDS' New Left Notes and attended an SDS teacher-organizer school. With other SDS women she helped to incorporate women's liberation into the organization's politics. She subsequently returned to San Francisco where she worked with Third World Newsreel in outreach in support of Native American and Palestinian sovereignty and against U.S. intervention in Iran and Vietnam and in solidarity with the Black liberation movement. With colleague Karen Ross, she explained their practice: "We stop people on the street, and confront them with our films. Involve them as participants. It has come to them during a walk down the street, they’ve stumbled upon it. They have been confronted. The decision to watch, to register disgust or interest is now theirs. To those inquisitive, we explain more."

In 1973, Buck was convicted on two counts of purchasing (otherwise legal) ammunition using false identification and sentenced to ten years in prison. In 1977 Buck was given a furlough from prison and went underground instead of returning.

== Support for the New Afrikan Independence Movement ==
In 1979, Assata Shakur, who had been convicted of killing a policeman, escaped from a New Jersey prison with help from a number of associates outside. In 1983, Buck was recaptured and convicted of participating in Shakur's escape.

Along with a number of Black Liberation Army members and supporters, Buck was convicted of conspiracies to commit armed robbery in the Brinks robbery of 1981, in which a guard and two police officers were killed. She allegedly drove one of the getaway cars, as well as helping to obtain a safe house and weapons. During the investigation into the armed robbery and killings, investigators found weapons and papers in an apartment in East Orange, New Jersey, rented by "Carol Durant," an alias of Buck.

Papers there led police to an address in Mount Vernon, New York, where they found bloody clothing and ammunition belonging to Buck.

== Resistance Conspiracy case ==
In 1985, Buck and six others were convicted in the Resistance Conspiracy case, a series of bombings in protest of United States foreign policy in the Middle East and Central America.

The May 12, 1988, indictment described the goal of the conspiracy as being "to influence, change and protest policies and practices of the United States Government concerning various international and domestic matters through the use of violent and illegal means" and charged the seven with bombing the United States Capitol building, three military installations in the Washington, D.C., area, and four sites in New York City. Warnings were called in before each of these bombings and no one was injured. The Capitol was targeted in retaliation for recent U.S. military invasions of Grenada and Lebanon. The military sites bombed were the National War College at Fort McNair, the Washington Navy Yard Computer Center, and the Washington Navy Yard Officers Club. In New York City, the Staten Island Federal Building, the Israeli Aircraft Industries Building, the South African consulate, and the offices of the Patrolmen's Benevolent Association were bombed or targeted. Six of those charged in the case have since been released from prison, and one was never captured.

== As an author ==
While in prison, Buck contributed articles on women in prison, solitary confinement, political prisoners and related issues to Sojourners Magazine, Monthly Review, and other journals and anthologies.

She published her poetry in journals, anthologies, a chapbook, and an audio CD. She received a PEN American Center prize for poetry in 2001. Her poems appeared in the anthologies Hauling Up the Morning, Wall Tappings, Igniting a Revolution: Voices in Defense of the Earth, Seeds of Fire, and in her chapbook, Rescue the Word. Her poems appear on the audio CD Wild Poppies.

Buck translated and introduced Cristina Peri Rossi's poetry book State of Exile, which was Number 58 in the City Lights Pocket Poets Series.

== Death ==
Marilyn Buck died at home in Brooklyn on August 3, 2010, after a long battle with uterine cancer, having been released on compassionate grounds from the Federal Medical Center, Carswell on July 15 of that year.

== Works ==
- Buck, Marilyn. 2002. Rescue the Word. San Francisco, California: Friends Of Marilyn Buck.
- Buck, Marilyn. 2003. "The Struggle for Status under International Law U.S. Political Prisoners and The Political Offense Exception to Extradition" in Joy James, ed., Imprisoned Intellectuals: America's Political Prisoners Write on Life, Liberation, and Rebellion (Rowman & Littlefield, 2003, ISBN 978-0-7425-2027-1). Retrieved from Political Prisoner Status under International Law by Marilyn Buck on May 1, 2010.
- Buck, Marilyn. 2004. "The U.S. Prison State". Monthly Review February. Retrieved from Monthly Review | The U.S. Prison State on March 20, 2008.
- Buck, Marilyn. 2008. Introduction and translation in Peri Rossi (2008).
- Buck, Marilyn, Laura Whitehorn, and Susie Day. 2001. "An Interview with Marilyn Buck and Laura Whitehorn: Cruel But Not Unusual: The Punishment of Women in U.S. Prisons". Reprinted in the Wayland Faculty Seminar 2003–2004, Incarceration, Narrative, and Performance. Rhode Island: Brown University. Retrieved March 26, 2008, from Incarceration ... Narratives: Prison Interviews.
- Freedom Archives, ed. 2004. Wild Poppies: A Poetry Jam Across Prison Walls – Poets And Musicians Honor Poet And Political Prisoner Marilyn Buck. San Francisco, California: Freedom Archives. Audio CD. ISBN 0-9727422-4-7. Available as mp3 downloads at Wild Poppies – Poetry by and with Marilyn Buck.
- Buck, Marilyn. 2012. Inside/Out: Selected Poems. City Lights. ISBN 978-0-87286-577-8.
