= Connie Matthews =

Jamaican activist and Black Panther Party member

- Matthews photographed in Denmark, 1968
- Born: Constance Evadine Matthews; August 3, 1943; Saint Ann Parish, Jamaica
- Died: c. 1993 (aged 49–50); Jamaica
- Political party: Black Panther Party
- Movement: Black Power Movement
- Spouse(s): Michael Tabor (m. c. 1970)

Constance Evadine Matthews (August 3, 1943 - 1993), better known as Connie Matthews, was an organizer with the Black Panther Party between 1968 and 1971. A resident of Denmark, she helped co-ordinate the Black Panthers with left-wing political groups based in Europe.

== Black Panther Party organizer ==
Matthews was born in Saint Ann Parish, Jamaica on August 3, 1943. As an adult, she had studied in London and Vienna and had obtained a master's degree in psychology. Matthews worked for the International Folk Music Council in Copenhagen, Denmark, 1967–1969. She first became involved with the Panthers in 1968.

In May 1969, Matthews was officially designated by the Panthers as their "International Coordinator", and was "authorized to mobilize to carry out demonstrations of support, raise funds, and inform the peoples of Scandinavia about poor black and oppressed peoples' revolutionary struggle from the Panthers' vanguard position". In early 1969, Matthews organised a tour of Black Panther Party leaders Bobby Seale and Raymond Hewitt around Northern Europe, with the goal being to network with left-wing European political groups and raise funds for the "Free Huey" campaign, which sought to see Huey Newton released from prison. The tour was considered a success and Matthews was commended by the Panthers' central committee for her work, leading her to become more involved with the party.

Matthews continued to build a base of support for the Panthers in Europe. Matthews was also responsible for recruiting French intellectual Jean Genet, persuading him to travel to the United States for an extended tour where he took part in the "Free Huey" campaign.

In February 1970 Matthews was a part of a tour of the United Kingdom, intended to strengthen bonds between the Black Panther Party and the Black Power Movement growing in Britain at the time. Hailing from Jamaica, a Commonwealth nation, and having studied in London, Matthews was capable of speaking in a British manner, if not a British accent. However, during the tour, she spoke in a style more in line with the way the American Black Panthers spoke. Speaking to British Black Panthers, she was also critical of the direction they were going, telling them that they needed to work with non-black liberals and socialists instead of dividing into "sixteen organisations which won't work with white people". Between the use of American vernacular and stiff criticism, some of the British audience came away from the speech feeling stung. Derek Humphry, a journalist reporting on the speech for The Sunday Times, ran with the headline "Sister Connie Matthews swears at British Black Panthers", summarising how the speech was received.

=== "Zionist Judges" controversy ===
Matthews also began to also make visits to the United States as well as writing articles for The Black Panther, the Panthers' official newspaper. In the spring of 1970, she courted controversy in relation to the Chicago Eight trial, of which Bobby Seale was a part of. In one edition of the Black Panther, Matthews argued that Zionists were responsible for the legal prosecution of prominent Black Panther leaders, identifying both Judge Monroe Friedman and Judge Julius J. Hoffman as "Zionist judges." She claimed that Jewish defendants (whom she called "Zionists") in the Chicago Conspiracy Eight trial had sacrificed Bobby Seale for their own benefit and concluded by condemning Zionism as "a racist doctrine". Throughout the article, Matthews made no distinction between Jews, Zionists, and racists, consistently treating the terms as interchangeable and portraying Zionists collectively as responsible for racism, political persecution, and the actions of individual Jewish figures. Huey Newton would directly respond to the controversy, asking Jewish publications such as the magazine Jewish Currents to reprint a statement he had made in September 1969 in the Black Panther newspaper, where he explicitly stated the official policy of the party was not antisemitic. Newton also referred to the controversy within the Black Panther paper itself in a late April 1970 edition in which he referred to Matthews' comments as "made in anger" (at how the trial was being run).

== Michael Tabor and Algeria ==
Matthews eventually rose through the Panther ranks to become the personal secretary of party leader Huey Newton. Writer T.J. English claims in order to protect Matthews from being deported from the US, he ordered Black Panther member Michael Tabor to marry Connie. English further suggests that this plan backfired on Newton, who was in a sexual relationship with Matthews at the time, as the relationship between Tabor and Matthews blossomed from sham-marriage into genuine love.

In 1969, Tabor and 12 other members of the Black Panthers were charged for allegedly plotting to kill police officers and to plant bombs in New York City commercial and public buildings, in what came to be known as the Panther 21 Trial. In February 1971, Tabor and fellow defendant Richard Moore failed to appear for trial and consequently forfeited $150,000 in bail. Newton was furiously and had Tabor and Moore declared "enemies of the people". Matthews was denounced as well, and accusing of fleeing the Party and taking valuable assets with her. Moore, Tabor and Matthews all resurfaced a month later in Algeria, where Black Panther Party leaders Eldridge and Kathleen Cleaver had previously fled to after Eldridge also escaped a trial. They joined a wider faction of Black Panthers who had all left the United States rather than faces trials, and who had all consolidated around the leadership of the Cleavers. Other Panthers in this clique were Donald L. Cox and his wife Barbara Easley Cox, Pete O'Neal and his wife Charlotte Hill O'Neal and Sekou Odinga to name a few.

In time, this faction, dubbed "The International Section of the Black Panther Party" by the Panthers, came to be considered to be in a feud with the main branch of the Black Panthers in America who remained under the leadership of Huey Newton and to a lesser degree, David Hilliard. Internal tensions between the groups were deliberately greatly intensified by the FBI, who unleashed the full force of their COINTELPRO project on them.

The Algerian-based panthers all eventually went their separate ways and in 1972 Tabor and Matthews emigrated to Zambia. Matthews eventually returned to her homeland of Jamaica, where she died of cancer in 1993.
