= Kuwasi Balagoon =

American anarchist activist (1946–1986)

- Born: Donald Weems; December 22, 1946
- Died: December 13, 1986 (aged 39)
- Organization(s): Black Panther Party; Black Liberation Army
- Movement: Cambridge movement; Black Power Movement; Black Liberation; Black anarchism
- Escaped: September 27, 1973 (first); May 7, 1978 (second)
- Escape end: May 1974 (first); January 1982 (second)

Details
- Victims: Waverly Brown; Edward O'Grady; Peter Paige
- Military career
- Allegiance: United States
- Branch: United States Army
- Service years: 1964–1967

Kuwasi Balagoon (born Donald Weems; December 22, 1946 – December 13, 1986) was an American political activist, anarchist and member of the Black Panther Party and Black Liberation Army.

Radicalized by race riots in his home state of Maryland growing up, as well as by his experiences while serving in the US Army, Weems became the black revolutionary known as Kuwasi Balagoon in New York City in the late 1960s. First becoming involved in local Afrocentric organizations in Harlem, Balagoon would move on to become involved in the New York chapter of the Black Panther Party, which quickly saw him arrested and charged for alleged criminal behavior. Balagoon was initially part of the Panther 21 case, in which 21 Black Panthers were accused of planning to bomb several locations in New York City. Although the Panther 21 were acquitted, Balagoon's case was separated off, and he was convicted instead of a New Jersey bank robbery.

While serving his sentence, Balagoon became disillusioned with the Black Panther Party and drifted into the more radical Black Liberation Army while also ideologically embracing Black anarchism. During the 1970s, Balagoon would escape prison twice, and during his second period on the run, would be involved in breaking Assata Shakur out of prison in 1979. In 1981 Balagoon was amongst the several BLA, May 19 Communist Organization and Weather Underground members involved in the 1981 Brink's robbery, which resulted in the deaths of two police officers and one security guard. Following his capture in 1982, Balagoon was tried and sentenced to life in prison for his involvement. While in prison, Balagoon died of pneumocystis pneumonia brought about by AIDS on 13 December 1986. He was 39 years old.

== Biography ==
=== Early life ===
Balagoon was born Donald Weems in the majority-Black community of Lakeland in Prince George's County, Maryland on December 22, 1946. In the early 1960s, the teenage Weems was influenced by Gloria Richardson and the Cambridge movement occurring in Maryland seeking civil rights for African-Americans. The Cambridge movement was noted for breaking away from "passive resistance" and becoming more militant, with Gloria Richardson defending active self-defence as a tactic. The Cambridge movement eventually led to the Cambridge riot of 1963, and the National Guard was sent into Maryland for a year as a result.

After graduating high school, Weems joined the US Army and was deployed to Germany, where he experienced racism and physical attacks from white officers and enlisted men. In response, Weems and other Black soldiers formed a secret group within the Army called "Da Legislators," which carried out revenge attacks. It was during this period in Europe that Weems visited London, England, where he met African immigrants, Black immigrants from the Caribbean, and other Black British people. Weems found the experience of meeting Black people of other nationalities stimulating and began embracing a more Afrocentric lifestyle.

Having served 3 years in the army, mostly in Germany, Weems was honourably discharged in 1967. He returned home to the United States and settled in New York City where his sister Dianne now lived.

=== Activism in New York ===
After settling in New York City, Weems became an activist, and at first, was particularly active in rent strikes as part of the Community Council on Housing, a tenant's rights group. It was on behalf of the CCOH that in 1967, Weems, his sister Dianne, CCOH leader Jesse Gray, and two other tenant activists were arrested for disorderly conduct in Washington, D.C. after they interrupted a session of Congress and brought a cage of rats to the assembly to highlight urban housing conditions. The action cost the CCOH what funding it had, and Gray could no longer pay its mainstay activists.

Following this, Weems moved on from the CCOH and joined the Central Harlem Committee for Self-Defense, a group involved with providing food and water to students who occupied buildings as part of the Columbia University protests of 1968. It was around this same time period that Weems became interested in and involved with the Yoruba Temple in Harlem run by Adefunmi, which promoted a form of West African traditional religion. Adefunmi promoted Black Nationalism and encouraged followers to "Africanise" everything about themselves. It was under this influence that Weems Africanized his name to Kuwasi Balagoon. “Kuwasi” is a Ghanaian name for a male born on Sunday, while the Yoruba name “Balagoon” translates as “Warlord".

=== Black nationalist ===
As the 1960s progressed, Balagoon became more and more involved in the Black Power Movement as well as more ideologically inclined towards Black Nationalism. In his own words, Balagoon said: "[I] became a revolutionary and accepted the doctrine of nationalism as a response to the genocide practised by the United States government". Balagoon began to read literature such as The Autobiography of Malcolm X and Robert F. Williams’ book Negroes with Guns as well as Williams' newsletter The Crusader. Balagoon also became influenced by H. Rap Brown, who at the time was acting as a spokesperson for the Student Nonviolent Coordinating Committee. Amalgamating all these influences, Balagoon came to believe that the only means to achieve "Black Liberation" was through "protracted guerrilla warfare".

It was at this point that Balagoon joined the Black Panther Party (BPP). Balagoon had first become aware of the BPP following the arrest of Huey Newton after a shootout with local police in Oakland, California in October 1967. Around the same time, the Student Nonviolent Coordinating Committee and the Revolutionary Action Movement were involved in setting up a chapter of the Black Panthers in Harlem, New York City. Balagoon quickly joined the chapter, citing the Panthers' adoption of Maoism as a motivating factor.

=== Panther 21 trial ===
Balagoon was arrested in New Jersey in February 1969 and charged with bank robbery. He was indicted on 2 April 1969, along with 20 other Panther leaders and organizers, on conspiracy charges; the 21 defendants became known as the Panther 21. Amongst the charges were conspiracy to bomb the New York Botanical Gardens and local police stations as well as to assassinate police officers. Most of the defendants were released, but Balagoon was held without bail because of the more serious charges against him. Balagoon and fellow panther Sekou Odinga were accused of making an attempt to ambush and kill New York City police officers; the accusation claimed that they were stopped only by the intervention of more officers on the scene. Defence attorneys counterargued that this accusation was based on the witness testimony of BPP member Joan Bird, who they alleged was beaten by police until she agreed to state this. After hearing of Bird's arrest and alleged beating, on the day he was charged, Sekou Odinga escaped police custody and went on the run. Odinga avoided an attempted arrest on April 2 and proceeded to flee the United States for Algeria, where Panther leader Eldridge Cleaver was now based.

In the first week of October 1970, while awaiting trial, members of the Black Panther Party, including Balagoon, were involved in co-ordinated prison riots at both the Queens Branch House of Detention and Brooklyn House of Detention. Balagoon was being held in Queens with Lumumba Shakur and fellow Panther 21 defendant Kwando Kinshasa where, during the rioting, seven hostages were taken. As authorities attempted to negotiate with the prisoners, who were demanding better conditions inside the prison and speedier trials, inside the prison Balagoon attempted to influence decision-making, believing decisions should be consensus-based. However, Balagoon ultimately felt that the prisoners allowed the Black Panthers to make the decisions, and began disengaging from meetings. The prisons were later retaken, and while Balagoon was disappointed with the outcome, he was evidently pleased with the experience, expressing the belief that the riots demonstrated ordinary people could overcome the power of the state.

Balagoon's legal case was separated from 13 of those who had been arrested originally in the Panther 21 trial in order for Balagoon to face charges relating to the robbery in New Jersey. After two years of imprisonment, those 13 panthers were eventually acquitted. Meanwhile, in October 1971, Balagoon pled guilty to the charge that he attempted to shoot police officers during the Jersey robbery and he was sentenced to a term of between 23 and 29 years.

=== Ideological changes ===
It was during this time that Balagoon became disillusioned with the BPP leadership. He was particularly disappointed by the expulsion from the party of former Army Ranger Geronimo Pratt, who was thrown out of the party after his arrest in December 1970 for the 1968 murder of Caroline Olsen. Pratt was a popular figure amongst the New York members of the Panthers and his expulsion demoralised their ranks. In 1997 Pratt's conviction for that murder was overturned. Other factors continued to divide the West Coast and East Coast Panthers, including disagreements over out-of-town leadership and whether to embrace pan-Africanism nationalism or Internationalism. Tensions climaxed when the Panther leadership in California expelled members of the New York leadership Dhoruba bin Wahad, Michael "Cetewayo" Tabor and Connie Matthews. This led to the New York chapter of the Panthers officially splitting from the "national" Panthers.

Although in prison, Balagoon was aware of these events and was demoralized by them. Balagoon, alongside many former Panthers imprisoned alongside himself, began to look ideologically towards anarchism in response. Balagoon came to believe the Black Panther Party had stopped being a party concerned with the daily struggle of Black people in America and instead one totally focused on defending its membership in court trials against the state. It was this new ideological view that also brought Balagoon towards a new radical Panther splinter group called the Black Liberation Army, which advocated fighting a "war" against the state by members who had gone "underground".

=== First escape ===
During the 1970s Balagoon became affiliated with the Republic of New Afrika group. Their flag is seen here.

On September 27, 1973, Balagoon escaped imprisonment and went "underground" himself. He remained so for approximately eight months until he was re-arrested following an attempt by Balagoon to take Richard Harris on the run, as Harris was on temporary leave from prison to attend a funeral. Balagoon and Harris were caught after being wounded in a gun battle with correctional and police officers.

Imprisoned once again, Balagoon committed further to Anarchism and began exploring the works of Wilhelm Reich, Emma Goldman, Errico Malatesta, Buenaventura Durruti and Severino Di Giovanni and trying to applying their thoughts to "Black Liberation". Balagoon also began to affiliate with the Republic of New Afrika, a group that advocated African-Americans identifying as "New Afrikans" and that sought a Black nation-state within North America. From this point onwards Balagoon identified as a "New Afrikan Anarchist".

=== Second escape ===
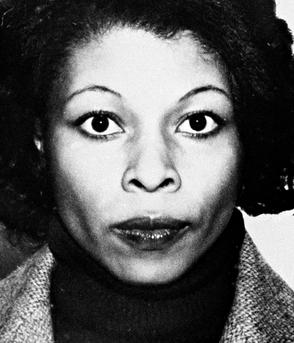
Balagoon was amongst BLA members who broke Assata Shakur out of a New Jersey prison in 1979

Balagoon escaped from Rahway State Prison in New Jersey and went underground once again on May 27, 1978, this time going on the run with the Black Liberation Army. He was joined by the likes of Sekou Odinga who had returned from Africa. On November 2, 1979, Balagoon was amongst members of the BLA, with assistance from the May 19 Communist Organization ("M19CO"), who broke Assata Shakur out of Clinton Correctional Facility for Women. Shakur had been imprisoned there following her conviction for the 1973 murder of police officer Werner Foerster.

=== 1981 Brink's robbery ===
In January 1982, Balagoon was captured and charged with participating, along with other members of the BLA, M19CO, and the Weather Underground, in the October 20, 1981 robbery of a Brink's armored truck in West Nyack, New York. Two police officers, Waverly Brown and Edward O'Grady II, and money courier Peter Paige were killed.

In July 1983, Balagoon was placed on trial alongside David Gilbert and Judith Alice Clark, white accomplices who had helped during the robbery. Upon a motion by the defence, the trial was transferred from Rockland County to Orange County due to concerns regarding the partiality of the juror pool in Rockland. During the trial, Balagoon dismissed legal representation and instead represented himself, using his speaking time to reject the authority of the court and to portray himself as a "prisoner of war". During the trial Balagoon was allowed to call Odinga as a witness, who had previously been convicted of racketeering and conspiracy but acquitted of the robbery and any murder charges due to double jeopardy laws. During Balagoon's examination of Odinga, Odinga confirmed that Balagoon and himself had been a part of the robbery and stated that the deaths that had taken place had been "justified." Previous to Odinga's testimony, none of the defendants had admitted any role in the robbery.

Balagoon was convicted of murder and other charges and sentenced to life imprisonment. Following the trial, he wrote: "As to the seventy-five years in prison, I am not really worried, not only because I am in the habit of not completing sentences or waiting on parole or any of that nonsense but also because the State simply isn't going to last seventy-five or even fifty years."

=== Final years ===
In an early 1980 television interview, Balagoon endorsed killing Black Liberation Army members who had become police informers and gave evidence used to convict BLA members such as Balagoon, deriding them as "traitors." In the same interview, Balagoon described the 1983 Beirut barracks bombings, in which two suicide bombers killed 307 people (mostly American and French peacekeeping forces) as "beautiful" and "incredible," adding that there was "a lot to learn" from it.

== Death ==
Balagoon died in prison of pneumocystis pneumonia, an AIDS-related illness, on December 13, 1986, aged 39. During his lifetime, Balagoon had been an openly bisexual man whose views on sexuality often intersected with his ideology. However, many of the groups he had been involved in, such as the New Afrikan People's Organization, omitted his sexuality and his cause of death in their official obituaries.

== Legacy ==
Balagoon authored several texts while in prison, writings that have become influential among Black and other anarchists since first being published and distributed by anarchist prisoner support networks in the 1980s and 1990s. In 2019, PM Press released Kuwasi Balagoon: A Soldier's Story. This collection of writings by and about Balagoon was edited by Matt Meyer and Karl Kersplebedeb and includes contributions from Sekou Odinga, David Gilbert, Meg Starr, Ashanti Alston, and other activists.

Since 2020, Black and Pink, a prison abolitionist organization supporting LGBTQ and HIV-positive prisoners, has awarded a "Kuwasi Balagoon award" for those living with HIV/AIDS.
