= Penology =

Subfield of criminology

Penology (also penal theory) is a subfield of criminology that deals with the philosophy and practice of various societies in their attempts to repress criminal activities, and satisfy public opinion via an appropriate treatment regime for persons convicted of criminal offences.

The Oxford English Dictionary defines penology as "the study of the punishment of crime and prison management," and in this sense it is equivalent with corrections. The term penology comes from "penal", Latin poena, "punishment" and the Greek suffix -logia, "study of".

Penology is concerned with the effectiveness of those social processes devised and adopted for the prevention of crime, via the repression or inhibition of criminal intent and the fear of punishment. The study of penology therefore deals with the treatment of prisoners and the subsequent rehabilitation of convicted criminals. It also encompasses aspects of probation (rehabilitation of offenders in the community) as well as penitentiary science relating to the secure detention and retraining of offenders committed to secure institutions.

Penology covers many topics and theories, including those concerning prisons (prison reform, prisoner abuse, prisoners' rights, and recidivism), as well as theories of the purposes of punishment (deterrence, retribution, incapacitation and rehabilitation). Contemporary penology concerns itself mainly with criminal rehabilitation and prison management. The word rarely applies to theories and practices of punishment in less formal environments such as parenting, school and workplace correctional measures.

== History ==
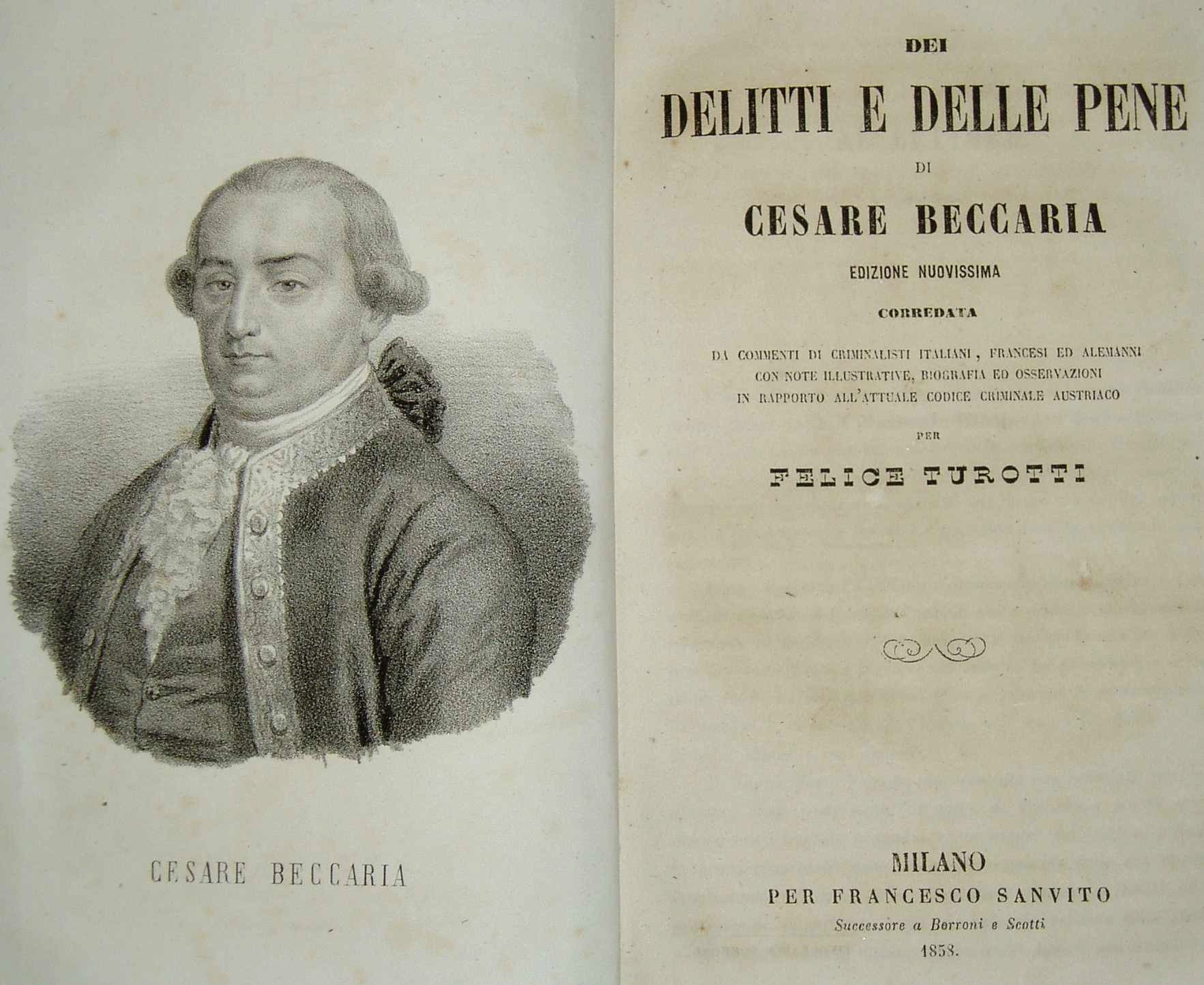
Cesare Beccaria, Dei delitti e delle pene

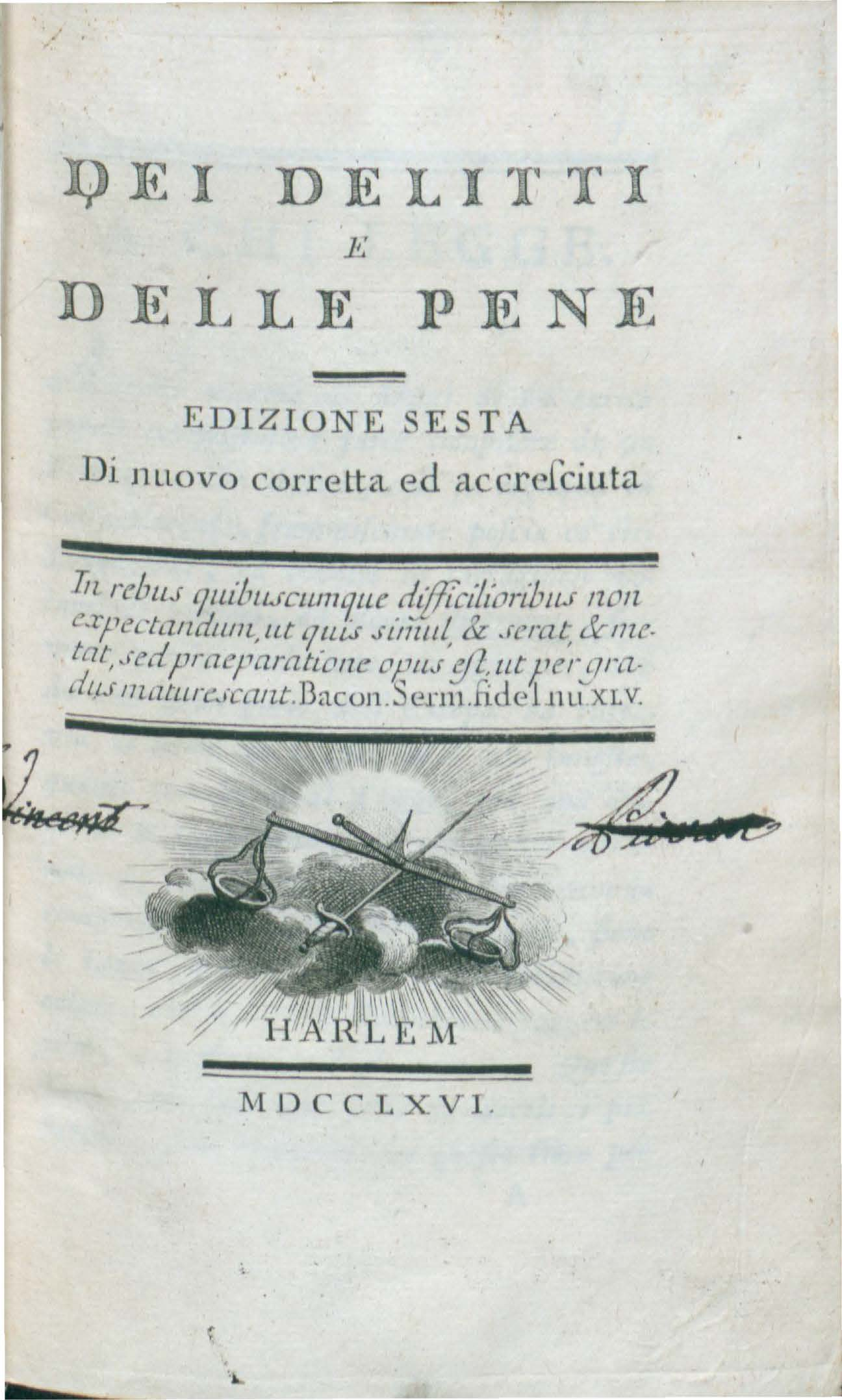
Dei delitti e delle pene (1766), frontpage, 6th edition.

Historical theories were based on the notion that fearful consequences would discourage potential offenders. An example of this principle can be found in the Draconian law of Ancient Greece and the Bloody Code which persisted in Renaissance England, when (at various times) capital punishment was prescribed for over 200 offenses. Similarly, certain hudud offenses under Sharia hadith tradition may incur fearful penalties.

Modern theories of the punishment and rehabilitation of offenders are broadly based on principles articulated in the seminal pamphlet "On Crimes and Punishments" published by Cesare, Marquis of Beccaria in 1764. They center on the concept of proportionality. In this respect, they differ from many previous systems of punishment, for example, England's Bloody Code, under which the penalty of theft had been the same regardless of the value stolen, giving rise to the English expression "It is as well to be hanged for a sheep or a lamb". Subsequent development of the ideas of Beccaria made non-lethal punishment more acceptable. Consequently, convicted prisoners had to be reintegrated into society when their punishment was complete.

Penologists have consequently evolved occupational and psychological education programs for offenders detained in prison, and a range of community service and probation orders which entail guidance and aftercare of the offender within the community. The importance of inflicting some measure of punishment on those persons who breach the law is however maintained in order to preserve social order and to moderate public outrage which might provoke appeals for cruel vengeance.

More recently, some penologists have shifted from a retributive based punishment to a form of community corrections. "Community corrections involves the management and supervision of offenders in the community. These offenders are serving court-imposed orders either as an alternative to imprisonment or as a condition of their release on parole from prison. This means they must report regularly to their community corrections officer and may have to participate in unpaid community work and rehabilitation programs."

== See also ==
- Auburn System
- Zebulon Brockway
- Elmira Correctional Facility
- His Majesty's Prison Service
- Offender workforce development
- Panopticon
- Penal transportation
- Prison reform
- Protective Pairing
