= Zebulon Brockway =

American criminologist (1827–1920)

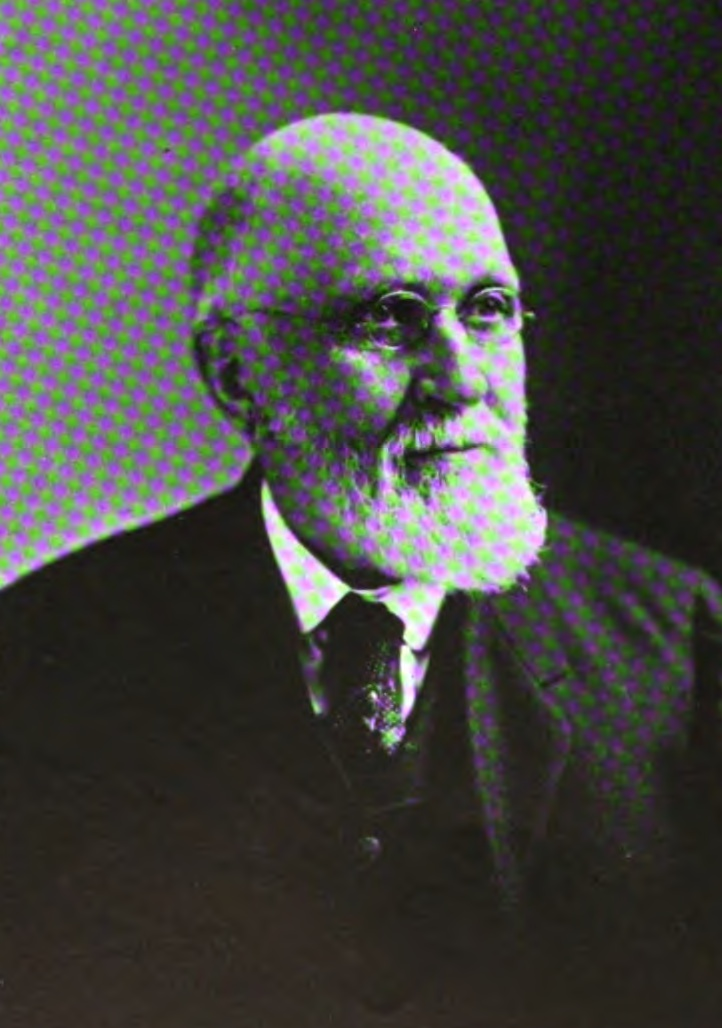
- Born: Zebulon Reed Brockway; April 28, 1827; Lyme, Connecticut, US
- Died: October 21, 1920 (aged 93); Elmira, New York, US
- Occupation: Penologist
- Known for: Prison reformer

Zebulon Reed Brockway (April 28, 1827 – October 21, 1920) was an American penologist and is sometimes regarded as the "Father of prison reform" and "Father of American parole" in the United States.

== Early life ==
Brockway was born in Lyme, Connecticut, on April 28, 1827. He married Jane Woodhouse (1828–1911) on April 13, 1853.

== Career ==
He began his career as a prison guard or assistant warden at the state prison in Wethersfield, Connecticut, in 1848. Brockway became a clerk at the Wethersfield prison by 23 years old. Later he worked as assistant superintendent of the Municipal Alms House in Albany, New York, for four years. He was made the Monroe County Penitentiary superintendent in 1854. There, he focused upon rehabilitation of the prisoners. In 1861, Brockway became the superintendent of the prison in Detroit, where he attempted to introduce work and release supervision programs and "indeterminate sentences". Brockway's chief innovation, though, was his attempt to establish the country's first indeterminate sentencing system. In 1869, Brockway drafted a law, passed by the Michigan legislature but overturned by the state Supreme Court, that would allow for the conditional and discretionary release of "common prostitutes."

When he was in Detroit, he got the inspiration for his prison reforms from Moses and Amos Pilsbury, who also brought about prison reforms. He began his reforms in Detroit. However, he resigned in 1872 when his ideas were no longer accepted.

Before the Elmira Reformatory was built, Brockway was already made the superintendent in 1876. While warden at the Elmira Reformatory in Upstate New York from 1876 to 1900, Brockway claimed to introduce a program of education, training in useful trades, physical activity, indeterminate sentences, inmate classification according to "grades," and an incentive program; his own reports of the accomplishments of the reformatory were highly influential in prison reform across the nation. Publicly, Brockway claimed to believe that the aim of the prison was to rehabilitate and not simply to punish. Grounding his claims in anecdotal and eugenic "prison science," Brockway publicly advocated for the reformatory's provision of Christian moral education paired with manual labor as a means of reforming the individual incarcerated therein. He also used the idea of the indeterminate sentence to incentivize prison discipline.

In 1895, the State Board of Charities opened an investigation into accusations of brutality at Elmira after John Gilmore, a man formerly incarcerated at the reformatory, appeared before a judge on a parole violation and begged to be sent to the state prison rather than returned to Elmira. An investigation by the State Board of Charities revealed that Brockway himself regularly inflicted violent corporal punishment on individuals incarcerated there, and utilized forced labor, solitary confinement for negligible offenses, refusal of medical care, and starvation as methods of governance. Individuals incarcerated at Elmira also testified that sexual violence was rampant and in some cases facilitated by guards, that the grading system was used arbitrarily as a method to keep people imprisoned for longer terms, and that Brockway refused to release some people from prison unless they agreed to take employment at Elmira Reformatory upon release. One such individual coerced into employment as a watchman at Elmira after release was found to have committed suicide during his shift.

In his research on the investigation, Alexander Pisciotta writes, "The final report of the committee, released on 14 March 1894, was unequivocal; its findings were unanimously endorsed by the ten members of the New York State Board of Charities: 'That the charges and the allegations against the general superintendent Z. R. Brockway of 'cruel, brutal, excessive, degrading and unusual punishment of the inmates' are proven and most amply sustained by the evidence, and that he is guilty of the same.' Brockway retired at the age of 72 in 1900 after further criticism. Brockway was such a popular man in Elmira that he was elected mayor five years later at 77.

In 1912, he wrote Fifty Years of Prison Service: An Autobiography (1912).

== Death ==
Zebulon Brockway died in Elmira, on October 21, 1920, at the age of 93.
