= Elmira Correctional Facility =

Maximum security state prison in New York, US

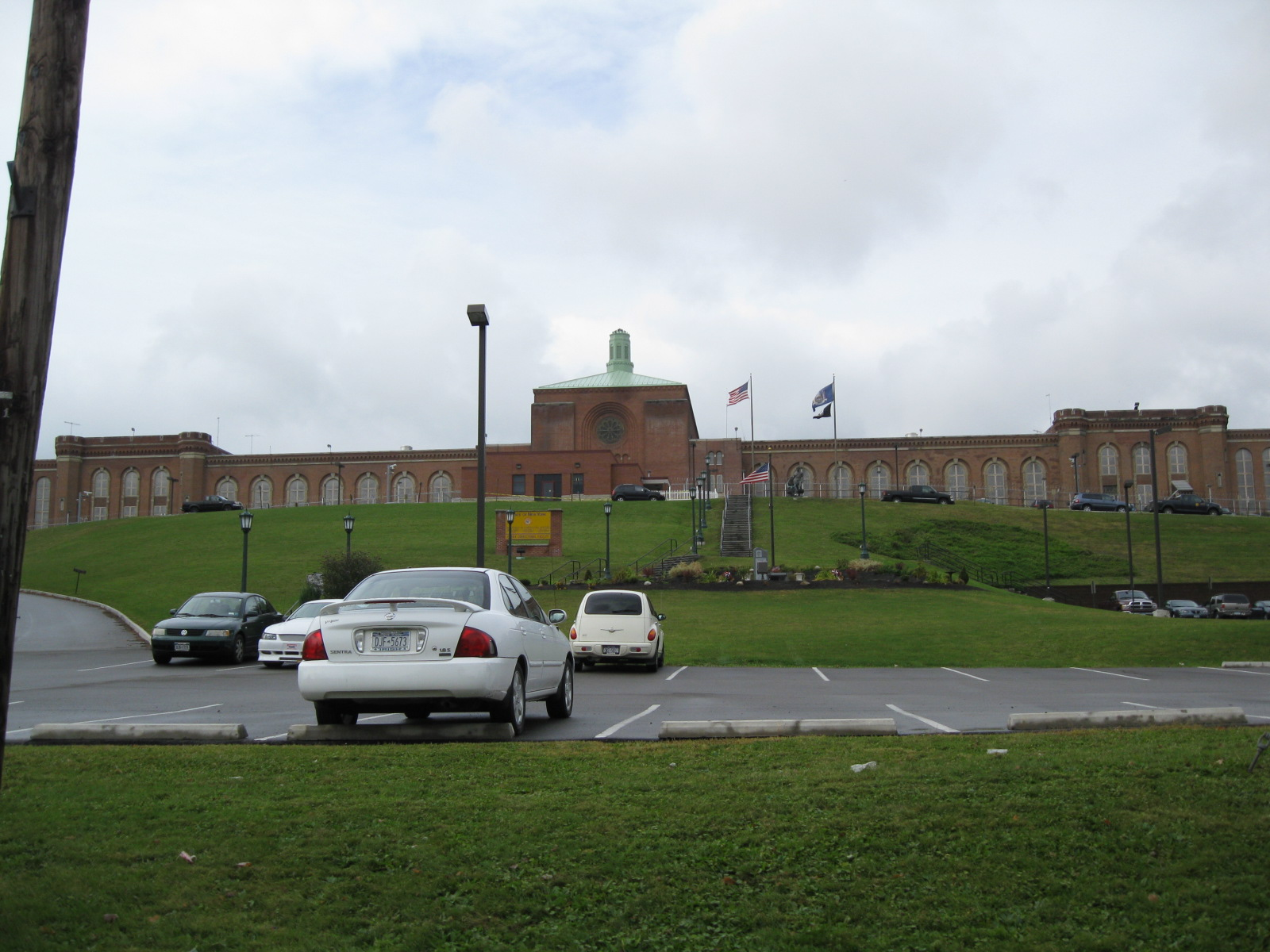
- Interactive map of Elmira Correctional Facility
- Location: Elmira, New York; 42°6′53.03″N 76°49′44.64″W
- Status: Operational
- Security class: Maximum security
- Opened: 1876 (as Elmira Reformatory)
- Managed by: New York State Department of Corrections and Community Supervision

Elmira Correctional Facility, also known as "The Hill", is a maximum security state prison located in Chemung County, in the City of Elmira in the US state of New York. It is operated by the New York State Department of Corrections and Community Supervision. A supermax prison, Southport Correctional Facility, was located 2 miles (3.2 km) away from Elmira. Southport closed in 2022.

The facility was founded in 1876 as the Elmira Reformatory and run by its controversial superintendent Zebulon Brockway. Acting with rehabilitative aims, Brockway instilled strict discipline along the lines of military training. Although accused of brutality in 1893 for his corporal punishment, Brockway was an acknowledged leader in his field. At his retirement in 1900, the Elmira System had been adopted by the states of Massachusetts, Ohio, Pennsylvania, Indiana, Illinois, and Minnesota.

Elmira is a major stop in the New York State Department of Corrections bus network, with a large enclosed yard that holds many, and inmate transfers.

== History ==
=== Early years ===
In 1876, the facility was founded as the "Elmira Reformatory". Its first superintendent was Zebulon Brockway. It differed from many prisons of the day as it focused on reforming the convict using psychological methods rather than physical. Previously, prisoners were required to abide by the "holy trinity" of silence, obedience, and labor. Sentences were indeterminate. Inmates were only released after a warden's determination that they had "paid their debt to society". In contrast, Elmira sought to reform and rehabilitate. Brockway set up a system of incentives to encourage self-discipline.

=== Elmira system ===
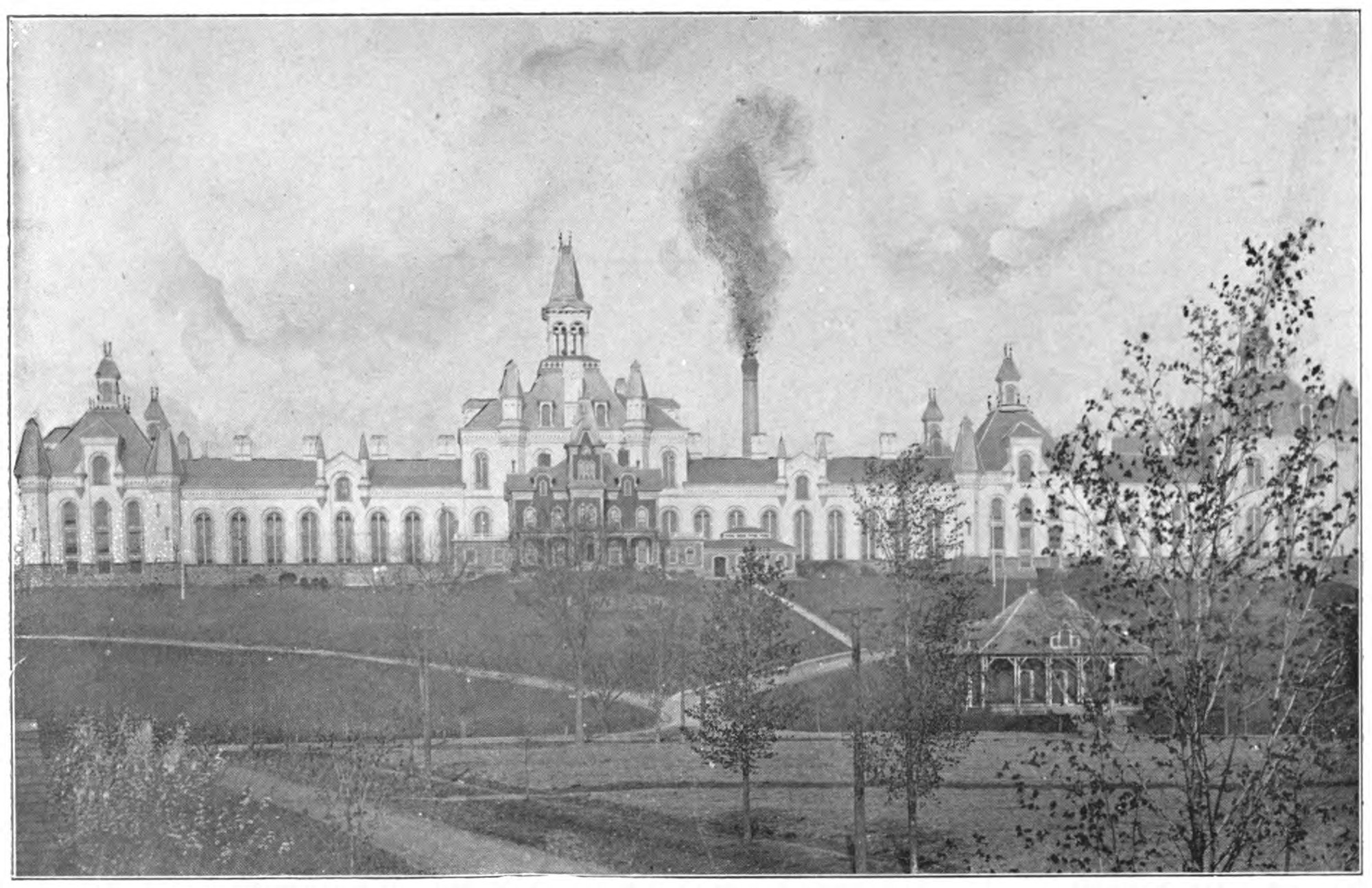
Elmira Reformatory (circa 1897)

Among the programs begun at the reformatory included courses in ethics and religion, vocational training in various trades and extracurricular activities (such as a prison band), a newspaper, and various athletic leagues.

Influenced by the methods of Walter Crofton's "Irish system", as well as Alexander Maconochie's experiments in Australian penal colonies, discipline was largely patterned after military academies. Inmates would be dressed in military style uniforms, often marching to the tune of a military band.

Inmates were classified by three "grades", with newly arriving prisoners being placed at second grade for their first six months. Those who became the most responsive and cooperative prisoners earned a first grade, with the opportunity to earn additional privileges or "marks", including earning a reduction of their sentences or being granted parole. Note that inmates could also be demoted if failing in their duties. Those inmates who were less responsive to rehabilitation or had behavioral problems were placed at third grade.

However, under instituted indeterminate sentencing, tension was often high among the general population, as prisoners were rarely informed how long the terms of their imprisonment lasted. Brockway's later use of corporal punishment, the "Paddler Brockway" system that would eventually result in several prisoners' being transferred to mental asylums, caused some to question the reformatory system.

Still, the Elmira system was influential in prison reform. Two central ideas emerged from the Elmira system: differentiating between juvenile and adult offenders; and acknowledging the possibility of prisoner rehabilitation.

=== Later years ===
Despite its mixed results, the Elmira Reformatory would influence the construction of 25 reformatories in twelve states over the next 25 years, reaching its height in 1910. Although the education programs introduced in Elmira were the first to serve inmates in a correctional facility, the majority of the teaching staff were often unqualified, and its complex grading system made progress difficult to maintain. Eventually, all well-behaved inmates were placed in first grade with a few in second grade and those under punishment in third grade.

However, following Brockway's resignation, the reformatory reinstituted to standard custody and treatment methods and eventually converted to the Elmira Correctional and Reception Center, an adult maximum security prison holding approximately 1,800 inmates.

In 1970, the complex was renamed the "Elmira Correctional and Reception Center". Elmira retained a focus on younger offenders until some time in the 1990s.

In the late 1970s through late 1980s, Elmira and Corning Community College had a partnership whereby college professors volunteered to lecture within the prison, and inmates were able to earn an associate degree. However, during the recession of 1990–1992 there was a public outcry over spending taxpayer money to educate felons while many middle-class families struggled to pay their children's college tuition. As a result, the program was cut. There were attempts to revive the program in later years but by the time George Pataki, the former GOP governor, finished his budget cuts, the program was completely terminated. In the fall of 2023 the program with CCC started back up again with college professors lecturing at the prison.

On July 7, 2003, convicted murderers Timothy Vail and Timothy Morgan escaped by digging through the roof of their cell. Vail seriously injured himself during the escape, and the two were captured three days later and placed in solitary confinement in different prisons. Their escape was featured in the National Geographic documentary Breakout (2010; S01E07). It was also featured in the History Channel series History's Greatest Escapes, Season 1 Episode 7, Escaping Hellmira.

== Wardens ==
- Zebulon Reed Brockway (1827–1920) 1876 to 1900.
- Frank LaMar Christian (1876–1955) 1917 to 1939.
- Ronald Miles

== Notable inmates ==
- Frank Abbandando - Murder Inc. contract killer
- John Bunn - Suspected murderer of two corrections guards
- Lucien Carr - Key member of the original New York City circle of the Beat Generation in the 1940s
- Trevell Gerald Coleman AKA G-Dep - Rapper and convicted murderer
- Lester Ford - Serial killer
- Nauman Hussain - Operator of Prestige Limousine convicted of second degree manslaughter for his role in a limo collision that killed 20 people.
- Frank Lucas - Harlem drug lord portrayed by Denzel Washington in the film American Gangster (2007)
- Kevin Monahan - Convicted in the murder of Kaylin Gillis, where he shot at her and a group of friends in his driveway at his home in Hebron, New York
- Guy Riviera - Perpetrator in the killing of Jonathan Diller
- Armand Schaubroeck - Musician and proprietor of House of Guitars
- Nathaniel White - Serial killer
- Dwight York - Nuwaubian Nation Cult leader

== See also ==
- Elmira Prison
- History of United States Prison Systems

== Bibliography ==
- Roth, Mitchel P. (2006). Prisons and Prison Systems: A Global Encyclopedia. Westport, Connecticut: Greenwood Publishing Group. ISBN 0-313-32856-0.
- Sifakis, Carl (2003). The Encyclopedia of American Prisons. New York: Facts on File. ISBN 0-8160-4511-9.
