= Frank LaMar Christian =

American prison warden (1876–1955)

Frank Lamar Christian
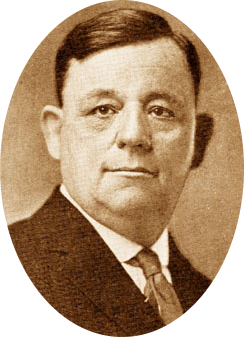
- Christian in 1927

Warden of Elmira Correctional Facility
- In office 1917–1939

Acting Warden of Auburn Prison
- In office 1929–1929
- Appointed by: Franklin D. Roosevelt

Personal details
- Born: February 23, 1876 Waterloo, New York
- Died: November 20, 1955 (aged 79) Elmira, New York
- Education: Cornell University; Columbia University College of Physicians and Surgeons

Frank Lamar Christian, M.D. (February 23, 1876 – October 20, 1955), was the warden of Elmira Correctional Facility, in the US state of New York, from 1917 to 1939.

== Biography ==
He was born on February 23, 1876, in Waterloo, New York. He had a short career in baseball for one of the Rochester teams.

He attended Waterloo Academy, then Cornell University. He received his M.D. from Columbia University College of Physicians and Surgeons in 1899. He became the ambulance physician at Bellevue Hospital. He took a job at Eastern District Reformatory and in 1901 he was appointed as the medical superintendent of the Elmira Correctional Facility.

He was appointed as the warden of Elmira in 1917.

In 1929 he was appointed as the acting warden at Auburn Correctional Facility following a riot.

He retired after being stabbed in his car by two prisoners attempting an escape in 1939.

He died on October 20, 1955, at the Arnot-Ogden Hospital in Elmira, New York. He was buried in Woodlawn Cemetery.
