= Donald L. Cox =

Member of the Black Panther Party

Donald Lee Cox
- Cox (upper right) appearing on the cover of Newsweek on February 23, 1970. Elbert "Big Man" Howard occupies the lower right.
- Born: April 16, 1936; Appleton City, Missouri, United States
- Died: February 19, 2011 (aged 74); Camps-sur-l'Agly, France
- Other names: DC
- Occupation: Political organizer
- Organization: Black Panther Party
- Known for: Field Marshal of the Black Panther Party, 1967–71
- Spouse: Barbara Easley-Cox

Donald Lee Cox (April 16, 1936 – February 19, 2011), known as Field Marshal DC, was an early member of the leadership of the African American revolutionary leftist organization the Black Panther Party, joining the group in 1967. Cox was titled the Field Marshal of the group during the years he actively participated in its leadership, due to his familiarity with and writing about guns.

== Biography ==
Cox grew up in Appleton City in rural western Missouri. His grandfather, Joseph A. Cox, had been born into slavery in 1845 and had been freed around the time of Emancipation Proclamation. Joseph Cox married Maria Müller, a white immigrant to the area originally from German-speaking Unterkulm, Switzerland. The pair were wed in Kansas as interracial marriages were still illegal in the state of Missouri at the time. Don Cox's partial mixed ancestry would influence his views on race later in life.

Cox moved to San Francisco in 1953 at age 17. He became interested in political action by following the events of the Civil Rights Movement during the next several years. Cox was deeply disturbed by events such as the 16th Street Baptist Church bombing, in which 4 little black girls were killed and a further 22 people injured in an act of White Supremacist terrorism carried out by the Ku Klux Klan. He was also influenced by the writings of W.E.B. Du Bois and Herbert Aptheker, introduced to him by a white communist friend, Mark Hanson. He became affiliated with the Congress of Racial Equality, and in 1964 and 1965 he was involved in the series of protests directed against the Bank of America, San Francisco hotels, rental agencies and the automobile industry, who were discriminating against African-Americans.

Cox joined the Oakland, California-based Black Panthers in 1967 in response to a civilian-shooting-by-police incident in the Hunters Point section of San Francisco a year earlier. Along with Eldridge Cleaver, Huey P. Newton and Bobby Seale and others, Cox was a member of the "central committee" of the Panthers. Initially Cox did not have a formal title within the Black Panther group, but his role was understood to relate to the usage of firearms. Cox had been taught to use firearms and hunt during his upbringing in Missouri, and as such was able to train other fellow members in proper usage of a weapon. Cox was also far more aware than fellow members of the laws regarding firearms and knew how to legally purchase them. He would eventually receive the title of "Field Marshal" in 1968, and would later use the moniker "Field Marshal DC" while campaigning for the BPP.

Cox became a national organizer and spokesperson for the group, which was involved in multiple legal cases and a target of the COINTELPRO project of the United States Federal Bureau of Investigation. In January 1970, Cox was invited to speak to several dozen guests of composer Leonard Bernstein and his wife Felicia at their penthouse apartment in the wealthy Upper East Side neighborhood of Manhattan. The gathering was an effort to raise funds for the defense of twenty-one Black Panther members who were charged with conspiracy to bomb buildings and other crimes. Cox was photographed along with the Bernsteins for a cover story essay by Tom Wolfe in New York magazine, published in June 1970 and entitled "Radical Chic: That Party at Lenny's". The article led to the popularization of "radical chic" as a critical term. Cox, along with the Bernsteins, vehemently dismissed Wolfe's notion that the New York upper class was dabbling in radical politics as a fashion statement at the event, vouching for their sincerity.

Up to this point, Cox had been mainly based in his adopted home town of San Francisco but in the aftermath of the Panther 21 trial he moved to New York City in order to try and rebuild the party there, as well as provide some leadership for the East Coast-based chapters of the party. During this period when he was based on the East Coast, Cox was accused along with several others of conspiracy to murder a Panther who was an informant in Baltimore named Eugene Anderson. Cox fled the United States to avoid trial, living first in Algeria (where Eldridge and Kathleen Cleaver had already set up a base for exiled Panthers following their own escape from the US) and later in the Languedoc-Roussillon region of southern France. Cox did not return to the United States, although he married an American from Philadelphia, Barbara Easley.

Cox resigned from the Black Panther Party in mid-1971. Amongst other things, the reasons he cited for leaving the party in his autobiography were his disappointment and frustrations with the main leaders of the party: Huey Newton, Eldridge Cleaver, and David Hilliard. Cox suggests that Cleaver and particularly Newton became egomaniacs in light of the intense media spotlight the Panthers often found themselves under. Cox accuses Hilliard of becoming an unbearable autocrat in his role as BPP Chief of Staff, claiming Hilliard had embraced the practices of "Stalinism" and Marxism–Leninism upon reading Stalin's book Foundations of Leninism. Furthermore, Cox suggests that Hilliard began placing loyalty to the party above all else and that the slightest infraction would be cause enough for punishment, denouncement or expulsion from the Black Panther Party under his watch, with his orders being carried out by internal enforcers known as the "Black Guard" and "Buddha Samurai". Simultaneously, Cox says, Hilliard dismantled the power and authority of all other members of the Black Panther's central committee aside from himself, and that of Huey Newton, in a vicious drive for power.

He died in exile in Camps-sur-l'Agly, France in February 2011. His daughter, Kimberly Cox-Marshall, had his autobiography published posthumously in 2019.

== Works ==
- Cox, D. (2019) Just Another Nigger: My Life in the Black Panther Party Heyday Books.
