= Armand Schaubroeck =

American rock musician and radio host

- Born: Armand Philip Schaubroeck; January 20, 1944 (age 82); Illinois, U.S.
- Genres: Rock; garage rock; proto-punk; rock opera
- Occupations: Musician, songwriter, television personality, disc jockey
- Labels: House of Guitar, Mirror Records Inc.

Armand Philip Schaubroeck (born January 20, 1944) is an American rock musician, radio host, and frontman of the band Armand Schaubroeck Steals. He is the co-owner of the House of Guitars in his hometown of Rochester, New York.

Schaubroeck hosts "Armand Schaubroeck Spins Vinyl" every Saturday at 3pm on WRFZ in Rochester, NY. The new weekly episode airs two other times each week on Rochester Free Radio (WRFZ). Tuesdays at 1pm and late Thursday into Friday at midnight. Older episodes air at midnight late Sunday thru Wednesday. His show specializes in the music he has listened to in his lifetime.

== Early life ==
Armand Philip Schaubroeck was born on January 20, 1944, in Illinois.

In 1962, at the age of 17, Schaubroeck was sentenced to three years in prison for committing 32 burglaries, targeting groceries, hardware stores, schools, and even a church. Convicted of safecracking, he was incarcerated at the Elmira State Reformatory, a maximum-security prison in New York. However, he served only a year and a half before being released on parole.

His release coincided with the rise of Beatlemania in the U.S., which inspired him and his brothers to sell electric guitars from their mother's basement, later opening the "House of Guitars." They also briefly ran a beatnik café, The Black Candle, near Lake Ontario, which hosted a variety of performers, including Jerry Porter and the legendary blues artist Son House, who, after learning of Schaubroeck's incarceration, trusted him.

== Career ==
=== 1960s–1970s ===
Armand Schaubroeck began his musical journey with his first band, Kack Klick, which in 1964 released a single related to Schaubroeck's experience in prison, which became a recurring theme in his work. The single was released on his own independent record label "House of Guitar," before disbanding shortly thereafter.

He later formed another short-lived garage rock group called the Church Mice. Due to a lack of funds, the band independently pressed and distributed their proto-punk single "College Psychology On Love" b/w "Babe We're Not Part of Society" in 1964, while recording the song in the House of Guitar store as well as designing and gluing the cover art by hand, a practice that anticipated the late 1970s DIY punk movement. Released in 1965, the single saw low sales, with Schaubroeck pressing only about 1,000 copies. The remaining copies were stored in the cellar of House of Guitars for years until rock journalist Greg Shaw began reselling them via mail order, turning it into a rare and sought-after garage rock release.

In 1966, Armand Schaubroeck, sought out Andy Warhol through the local phonebook with the idea of a rock opera based on his own experiences within the U.S. prison system. WXXI later stated "no one was really doing concept albums in 1966". Warhol liked the idea, but due to a busy schedule, the collaboration never materialized, the album would go unrecorded until 1975, when it was released as "A Lot of People Would Like to See Armand Schaubroeck ... DEAD".

Schaubroeck's time in prison became a recurring theme in his work, influencing the name of his later band "Armand Schaubroeck Steals" which formed after the dissolution of the Church Mice in 1967.

By 1972, Armand had launched a campaign for New York State Senate and the House of Guitars had relocated to a former three story mason's hall nicknamed “The largest guitar store in the world” and sometimes “The store that ate my brain” on 645 Titus Ave in Irondequoit where it still stands today, with the store later gaining notoriety due to satirical advertisements made for punk rock bands like the Ramones. Schaubroeck would later become an advocate for prison reform and gay rights.

== Discography ==
- A Lot of People Would Like to See Armand Schaubroeck ... DEAD (1975)
- I Came to Visit; But Decided to Stay (1977)
- Live at the Holiday Inn (1978)
- Shakin' Shakin' (1978)
- Ratfucker (1978)
