= Lester Ford =

American serial killer and rapist

- Born: February 11, 1963 (age 63); St. Albans, Queens, New York, U.S.
- Other name: "Justice"
- Status: Incarcerated
- Convictions: Second degree murder (3 counts); First degree rape
- Penalty: 40 years to life in prison

Details
- Victims: 3
- Span of crimes: January – July 1991
- Country: United States
- State: New York
- Date apprehended: July 26, 1991
- Imprisoned at: Elmira Correctional Facility

Lester Ford (born February 11, 1963) is an American serial killer and rapist who murdered three women in the Queens borough of New York City between January and July 1991. He was arrested after a survivor positively identified him and he confessed to the murders. Convicted of three counts of second degree murder, he was sentenced to life in prison with a minimum of 40 years served and has been incarcerated at the Elmira Correctional Facility ever since.

== Early life ==
Ford was born on February 11, 1963, in the neighborhood of St. Albans in Queens, among five other siblings. In 1979, he was arrested after a botched drug deal, a crime for which he was sentenced to five-years imprisonment. In 1985, he was released, but returned to prison only a year later after attempting to sell drugs to an undercover officer. He was paroled in September 1989 and later found employment as a mail-clerk for the now-defunct NYNEX telephone company in Long Island. By 1991, he was living in his mother's home which he also shared with his stepfather, two brothers and two sisters. He was known to neighbors as "Justice".

== Murders ==
On the night of January 6, 1991, Ford was prowling through the Hollis neighborhood in eastern Queens when he encountered Sheilda Dixon, a 36-year-old mother of two. She was on her way home after attending a wedding when Ford approached and threw her to the ground. He taped her ankles together and her mouth shut but did not sexually assault her. Rather, he strangled her to death and dumped her body under some bleachers at Peters Park baseball field, where it would be found almost three weeks later. Although there was no sort of identification on her, she was positively identified by her husband, Eugene. Affected badly by her death, Eugene moved him and his two children to Virginia shortly after.

Ford struck again on February 23, when he attacked 28-year-old former social worker Tracy Covington outside her home in southeastern Queens. Similar to Dixon's murder, Ford taped Covington's mouth and ankles before strangling her to death. He dumped her body behind a convenience store along Linden Boulevard just outside Queens, and when it was found a link with the Dixon case was almost immediately established. This led to Queens police issuing a warning to female residents to take special precautions to avoid the active serial killer.

On the night of July 4, Ford raped a 16-year-old girl in the St. Albans neighborhood, although he chose not to kill her. On the night of July 24, Ford encountered 20-year-old Sabrina Bost, who was eight months pregnant, as she was walking to a bus stop. Ford brandished his gun and raped her at gunpoint before shooting her in the face and fleeing. She did not die immediately and was rushed to the Jamaica Medical Center, where doctors placed her on life support and performed an open cardiac message to keep her baby alive. Approximately six hours after being emitted, the baby was successfully delivered, but Bost herself never regained consciousness and was declared dead shortly after. The day after killing Bost, Ford raped a 29-year-old woman, but did not kill her.

== Arrest and conviction ==
On July 26, 1991, Ford was prowling through a neighborhood in southeastern Queens when his latest rape victim, who was riding in a police surveillance van, spotted him and positively identified him as her attacker. He was arrested immediately after and became the prime suspect in the murders. His home was searched, and police seized his .25 caliber handgun, and when it was tested it was determined that the bullets recovered from Bost's murder came from his gun. Afterwards, he was interviewed by renown NYPD detective Bill Clark, who was most well known for getting David Berkowitz, a separate New York serial killer, to confess to his crimes. After interviewing Ford and confronting him with the evidence, he confessed to the murders, claiming he was a "sexually determined young man". A press conference was held following the confession and the public was officially told that the Queens serial killer had been caught.

After the press conference, Ford's girlfriend Lisa Cruell and her friend Cynthia Walker confronted and beat one of Ford's surviving victims, threatening to kill her if she testified against him. They were arrested and charged with assault and tampering with a witness. In March 1992, Ford accepted a plea agreement, confessing to his crimes, and was sentenced to 40 years to life in prison. He is serving his sentence at Elmira Correctional Facility.

== See also ==
- List of serial killers in the United States
