= Adelaide Abankwah =

Pseudonym taken by Ghanaian Regina Norman Danson

Adelaide Abankwah (born c. 1971) was a pseudonym taken by Ghanaian Regina Norman Danson when she tried to gain asylum in the United States, claiming to be fleeing female genital cutting and seeking political asylum.

== Life ==
=== Birth ===
Regina Norman Danson is believed to have been born around 1971 in Biriwa, Central Ghana.

=== 1999 ===
Abankwah was detained for over two years in the privately operated Queens Detention Facility in Jamaica, Queens, New York, when her application for asylum was twice rejected, first by an immigration judge, and then in 1999 by the Board of Immigration Appeals.

Eventually, the INS investigation determined that the "Abankwah" was an impostor. Her real name was Regina Norman Danson. She had adopted the name of another Ghanaian woman who was living in Maryland and whose passport had been stolen in Ghana. Danson admitted that she had given a wrong name but that her story was still true, insisting her mother was deceased. Further inquiries from Ghana showed that her mother, who had never been a tribal leader, was still alive.

The case came to the attention of feminist and human rights activists who began to lobby for her release. They included actresses Julia Roberts and Vanessa Redgrave and then First lady Hillary Clinton and Gloria Steinem with Equality Now. The Second Circuit Court of Appeals reversed the decision in July 1999 and granted Danson asylum. INS continued to investigate and found "overwhelming evidence" of fraud.

=== 2001 ===
The U.S. Department of Justice was still hesitant to pursue a fraud conviction because of possible public furor and bad publicity but indicted her in 2001 on fraud shortly before the statute of limitations ran out. The real Abankwah, whose documents had been stolen, cooperated with INS to have the case cleared.

=== 2002 ===
The fraud trial began on 14 January 2002. Prosecutor Ronnie Abrams stated that the bid for political asylum made a "mockery of the immigration system and real victims of genital mutilation". Tribal Chief Nana Kwa Bonko V testified that Danson was not in the tribe's royal succession and that they did not practice female circumcision.

=== 2003 ===
Danson was to be sentenced for fraud on 23 March 2003. However, she was sentenced to time served by federal Judge Charles Sifton. (She had spent 29 months in an immigration detention center.)

=== 2014 ===
Based on an amici curiae brief ("ON PETITION FOR REVIEW FROM THE BOARD OF IMMIGRATION APPEALS"), on behalf of Regina Danson Norman [sic] in 2014 by the Immigrant Defense Project, she apparently was never deported or removed from the United States.
