= Dhoruba bin Wahad =

American activist and author (born 1944)

- Born: Richard Earl Moore; June 30, 1944 (age 82); New York City, New York, U.S.
- Occupations: Activist, author
- Known for: Panther 21 defendant; Imprisonment for attempted murder of two NYPD officers
- Political party: Black Panther Party; Black Liberation Army
- Spouse(s): Iris Bull (m. 1967, divorced) Tanaquil Jones (m. 1988)
- Children: 4

Dhoruba al-Mujahid bin Wahad (born Richard Earl Moore on June 30, 1944) is an American political activist and author, former leader of the New York Black Panther Party, and member of the Black Liberation Army. He was one of the Panther 21 defendants charged in 1969 with conspiracy to attack New York City police stations. After a lengthy trial, the Panther 21 were exonerated.

In June 1971, bin Wahad was arrested and eventually convicted for the attempted murder of two New York City police officers. After serving 19 years in prison, he was released when a judge ruled that the initial arrest was part of the FBI's illegal COINTELPRO operation, and that the prosecution withheld crucial evidence from the defense.

Since his release in 1990, bin Wahad has divided his time between New York and Ghana, and writes frequently about the U.S. criminal justice system and Pan-Africanism.

== Early years ==
Richard Earl Moore was born in 1944 in a tenement in South Bronx. His parents were Collins Moore and Audrey Cyrus Moore. Collins' family had migrated from Georgia to Harlem in the 1920s. Audrey's family came from the island of Antigua. When Richard was an infant, Collins enlisted in the Army; he and Audrey soon separated and he was never a presence in his son's life.

While growing up, Richard became involved in street gangs. As a teenager, he spent six trouble-filled months in the Army before being given an undesirable discharge. Upon returning to the Bronx, he rejoined his gang, the Disciples. In May 1962, he fired a pistol during a skirmish with a rival gang. No one was hit, but Moore was arrested for felonious assault. He pled guilty and was sentenced to five years, which he served first at Elmira, then at Coxsackie, and finally at Comstock starting in 1964.

At the latter prison, Moore's political education began. He was mentored by a Muslim inmate and given books and pamphlets to read. For the first time, Moore encountered the slave narratives of Frederick Douglass, Nat Turner, and Harriet Tubman; he was deeply impressed by Malcolm X, whose speeches he read and listened to. Although Moore had no interest in joining the Nation of Islam (NOI), which he considered too dogmatic, he admired NOI Minister Malcolm X who he felt "wasn't just a bow tie, a talking head. He was funny; he was witty; he was analytical."

Moore was three years into his five-year sentence when he learned of the February 1965 assassination of Malcolm X. He was stunned by the news and came to believe, like many other black inmates, that the murder was carried out by NOI followers in coordination with elements of law enforcement. Moore decided the best way to honor the slain leader's legacy was "to think like Malcolm X, to take his message and apply it to his daily reality." Consequently, Moore converted to Islam, and changed his name to Dhoruba al-Mujahid bin Wahad; Dhoruba in Swahili means "he who is born in the storm". He continued his self-education, reading non-fiction works such as Edward Gibbon's The History of the Decline and Fall of the Roman Empire and Karl Marx's Das Kapital, and historical fiction such as Leon Uris's Exodus and novels about Attila the Hun and Genghis Khan.

== Panther 21 case ==
By 1967, bin Wahad was out of prison and living with his wife Iris in an apartment in Manhattan's East Village. In August 1968, following the April assassination of Martin Luther King Jr., bin Wahad joined the Black Panther Party. Within a couple of months, he was promoted to field secretary of New York state as well as chief of Eldridge Cleaver's security detail. Bin Wahad was soon identified by the FBI and NYPD as a "key agitator". He was placed in the FBI's "Security Index", "Agitator Index," and "Black Nationalist Photograph Album."

On April 2, 1969, in a pre-dawn raid carried out by NYPD's Bureau of Special Services (BOSS), bin Wahad and 20 other members of the New York chapter of the Black Panther Party were arrested on over 200 counts of conspiracy to attack police stations, kill police officers, and blow up public buildings. The arrested Panthers—two women and nineteen men—were initially labeled the "New York 21". As the case moved toward a trial, they were more commonly called the "Panther 21".

During the pre-trial hearings and seven-month-long trial, the national BPP leadership was riven by dissension and accusations: between Huey Newton and Eldridge Cleaver and Stokely Carmichael, and between Newton and the New York Panthers, especially bin Wahad and Michael "Cetewayo" Tabor. Newton referred to the Panther 21 as "traitors and jackanapes". The BPP newspaper denounced bin Wahad and Tabor as "enemies of the people". It was later discovered these leadership rifts were often provoked by the FBI through its counterintelligence program, COINTELPRO.

In January 1971, bin Wahad and Tabor were out on bail. After a fruitless meeting with Newton in an attempt to patch up differences, the two defendants fled the country to avoid possible assassination: Tabor went to Algeria, while bin Wahad traveled to Canada and then lived "underground" in various U.S. locations. While he was in hiding, bin Wahad penned a letter to The New York Times that was printed, after a three-month delay, on the editorial page on May 12, 1971. Entitled "A Black Panther Speaks" using the byline "Richard Moore", he condemned "the Fascist Farce of a Trial" for the New York Panthers, and also vented against Newton and David Hilliard for misappropriating BPP funds.

In the course of the trial proceedings, the jury learned of extensive police infiltration of the New York chapter of the BPP, and that the BPP's violent threats were often instigated by undercover agents. On May 13, 1971, the Panther 13 (charges against eight of the defendants had been dropped), including bin Wahad and Tabor in absentia, were acquitted on all counts after barely 90 minutes of jury deliberation. But bin Wahad was only temporarily out of legal jeopardy.

== Shooting of D.A. Hogan's police guards ==
On May 19, 1971, Thomas Curry and Nicholas Binetti of the New York City Police Department (NYPD) were sitting in a police car guarding the apartment building of Manhattan D.A. Frank Hogan. The officers spotted a blue Ford Maverick driving slowly past the D.A.'s residence. They went in pursuit and caught up with the car six blocks away. At that point, the officers were fired upon by a .45-caliber machine gun. They barely survived the hail of bullets: Curry was disfigured and brain damaged: Binetti was paralyzed. Their subsequent testimony indicated that the shooter was an African-American male in the passenger seat of the blue Maverick.

The May 19 shooting took place during a period of intense clashes between black activist organizations and the NYPD. Two days later, NYPD officers Waverly Jones and Joseph Piagentini were shot and killed outside a housing project in Harlem.

On June 5, 1971, bin Wahad was arrested and charged with robbing a Bronx after-hours "social club" that was a reputed meeting place for drug dealers:

Seized from inside the social club was a .45 caliber machine gun. Although the initial ballistics test on the weapon failed to link it with the Curry-Binetti shooting, NYPD publicly declared they had seized the weapon used in May 19. The NYPD now had in custody a well-known and vocal Black Panther leader and the alleged weapon linked to a police shooting.

Bin Wahad was charged with the attempted murders of Officers Curry and Binetti. His first trial ended in a hung jury; his second in a mistrial. In 1973, his third trial resulted in a guilty verdict; he was sentenced to twenty-five years to life.

== Prison and release ==
Bin Wahad spent a total of nineteen years in prison for the charge of attempted murder. While incarcerated, he learned about Congressional hearings that revealed the existence of the FBI's covert COINTELPRO operation. In December 1975, he filed a lawsuit against both the FBI and NYPD. In response to the lawsuit, the FBI released, over the next fifteen years, more than 300,000 pages of secret COINTELPRO documents. These became the basis upon which bin Wahad appealed his conviction. Finally, on March 15, 1990, Judge Peter J. McQuillan of the New York Supreme Court in Manhattan reversed the conviction, ruling that the prosecution had failed to disclose evidence that could have helped the defense. Among the withheld pieces of evidence,

the most critical item being a tape-recorded, anonymous call saying that Dhoruba Bin Wahad was not involved in the shooting. It turns out that the call was made by Pauline Joseph, who was a key prosecution witness who had implicated Dhoruba Bin Wahad. But the defense attorneys never got a hold of that tape from the prosecution.

In March 1990, Bin Wahad was freed and released without bail. Manhattan District Attorney Robert M. Morgenthau vowed to appeal the ruling, and said he would seek a retrial if the appeal failed.

In December 1991, Morgenthau's appeal was rejected by the Appellate Division of the New York Supreme Court. On January 20, 1995, the Manhattan district attorney's office stated there would be no retrial, indicating that the current condition of the evidence would make this impossible.

== Lawsuits ==
In 1995, the FBI settled with bin Wahad; the U.S. government paid him $400,000.

Bin Wahad's lawsuit against the NYPD, seeking $15 million in damages, began on December 4, 2000. Three days later, the city of New York ended the 25-year legal battle, agreeing to pay him an additional $490,000 in damages.

== Aftermath ==
Bin Wahad moved to Accra in Ghana, where he organized for Pan-Africanism and U.S. prison system reform. Drawing on funds from his lawsuit settlements, he established the Campaign to Free Black and New African Political Prisoners (formerly the Campaign to Free Black Political Prisoners and Prisoners-of-War) and founded the Institute for the Development of Pan-African policy in Ghana.

Along with his residence in New York City, bin Wahad spends part of each year in Ghana. He continues to write; his most recent book is Revolution in These Times (2025).

== Assault by New Black Panther Party ==
Wahad discussing black liberation and politics with Jill Stein and Cornel West in 2024

On August 19, 2015, bin Wahad and an associate were assaulted by a faction of the New Black Panther Party. Bin Wahad had been attending a conference in Atlanta, Georgia held by the Nzinga faction of the New Panthers, when bin Wahad confronted the group about their adoption of the Black Panther name and rhetoric. The two were ordered to leave but when they refused, bin Wahad was assaulted. He was left with a concussion, a broken jaw and lacerations from the attack. The event led founding member of the original Black Panthers, Elbert "Big Man" Howard, to denounce the group as "reactionaries" and "thugs".

== In popular culture ==
Anarchist punk band Resist and Exist wrote a song about bin Wahad.

== Bibliography ==
- Still Black, Still Strong: Survivors of the U.S. War Against Black Revolutionaries (PDF). Semiotext(e). 1993. ISBN 0936756748 – via Boston Anarchist Black Cross. Edited by Jim Fletcher, Tanaquil Jones, and Sylvère Lotringer. The book features interviews with bin Wahad, Mumia Abu-Jamal and Assata Shakur.
- "Beggars On Horseback: Creating a Pan-African Power Paradigm for the 21st Century". I Mix What I Like. 1998.
- "The Ethics of Black Atonement in Racist America: The Execution of Stanley Tookie Williams". 4StruggleMag. February 11, 2006.
- "Assata Shakur, Excluding the Nightmare After the Dream". I Mix What I Like. 2013.
- Look for Me in the Whirlwind: From the Panther 21 to 21st-Century Revolutions. PM Press. 2017. ISBN 978-1629633893. Co-written with Sekou Odinga, Shaba Om, and Jamal Joseph.
- Revolution in These Times: Black Panther Party Veteran Dhoruba Bin Wahad on Antifascism, Black Liberation, and a Culture of Resistance. Common Notions. 2025. ISBN 978-1945335136.

== Sources and further information ==
=== Books ===
- Blackstock, Nelson (1988). The FBI's Secret War on Political Freedom. Pathfinder. ISBN 0873488776.
- James, Joy (2003). Imprisoned Intellectuals: America's Political Prisoners Write on Life, Liberation, and Rebellion. Rowman & Littlefield. ISBN 0742520277.
- Imahkus, Seestah Imahkus Njinga (2010). Ababio (He/She Who Has Returned, A 21st Century Anthology Of African Diasporan Returnees to Ghana. St. Francis Press Ltd. ASIN B005CJ4S0C.
- English, T. J. (2011). The Savage City: Race, Murder, and a Generation on the Edge. William Morrow. ISBN 978-0061824555.

=== Films ===
- Chris Bratton; Annie Goldstein (1990). Framing the Panthers in black and white. Media Network, New York. OCLC 23442740.
- Peter Miller; Susanne Rostock; Ray Santisteban; Mike Harlow; Kevin Keating; Craig Murray; Dhoruba Bin Wahad; John J. Valadez (2006) [1993]. Passin' it on. Docurama. ISBN 0767090748. OCLC 70794128.
