= Panther 21 =

New York Black Panther Party defendants in 1970–71 trial

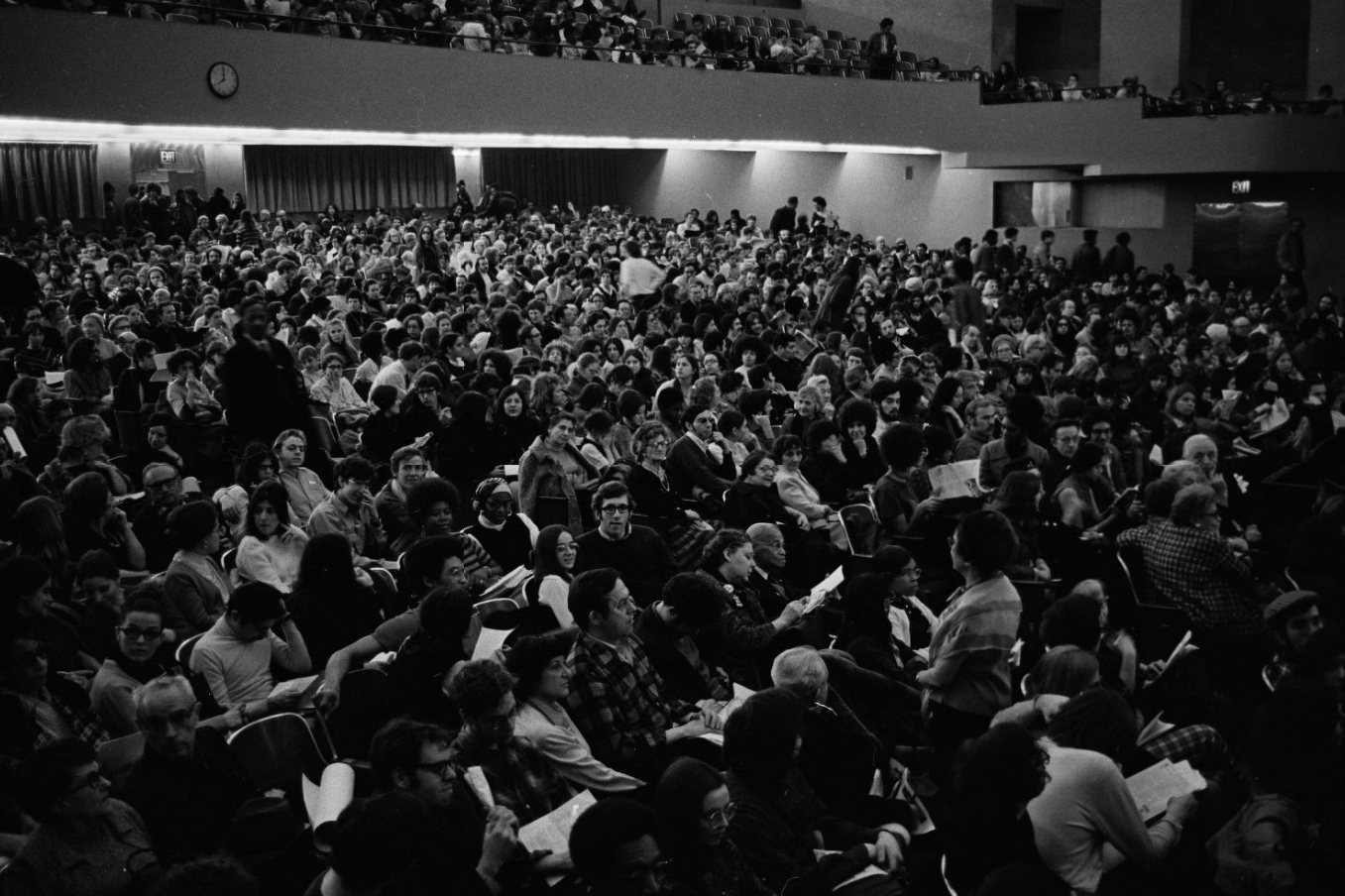
Some of the 2,500 attendees of a rally in support of the Panther 21 at Hunter College Auditorium, February 19, 1970.

The Panther 21 were a group of New York Black Panther Party (BPP) members who were arrested by the New York City Police Department (NYPD) in a pre-dawn raid on April 2, 1969. The 21 arrested Panthers—at first called the "New York 21" but later referred to as the "Panther 21"—were charged with over 200 counts of conspiracy in what was characterized as a BPP terror campaign against the city of New York, including attacking police stations, murdering police officers, and bombing public buildings.

By the time the trial began in October 1970, the case had been narrowed to 13 defendants and 156 counts of conspiracy. The trial lasted seven months and was at that time the longest and costliest in New York state history. When it concluded in May 1971, after revelations that undercover police agents in the BPP had played key instigator roles, the jury acquitted all 13 defendants of all charges.

== Arrests ==
At 4:30 a.m. on April 2, 1969, the NYPD's Bureau of Special Services performed a coordinated raid on the homes of twenty-one members of the New York chapter of the Black Panther Party. The arrestees, nineteen men and two women, were charged by Manhattan District Attorney Frank Hogan with conspiring to "murder policemen and blow up four police stations, five department stores, railroad lines, the Queens Board of Education building, and the Bronx Botanical Gardens."

The arrested New York Panthers were:

- Sundiata Acoli (a.k.a. Clark Squire)
- Kuwasi Balagoon (a.k.a. Donald Weems)
- Joan Bird
- Cetewayo (a.k.a. Michael Tabor)
- Robert S. Collier
- Lonnie Epps
- Richard Harris
- Ali Bey Hassan (a.k.a John J. Casson)
- Jamal Joseph (a.k.a. Eddie Joseph)
- Abayama Katara (a.k.a. Alex McKiever)
- Kwando Kinshasa (a.k.a. William King Jr.)
- Larry Mack
- Mkuba (a.k.a. Lee Berry)
- Mshina (a.k.a. Thomas Berry)
- Baba Odinga (a.k.a. Walter Johnson)
- Sekou Odinga (a.k.a. Nathaniel Burns and Nathaniel Williams)
- Shaba Om (a.k.a. Lee Roper)
- Curtis Powell
- Afeni Shakur (a.k.a. Alice Williams)
- Lumumba Abdul Shakur (a.k.a. Anthony Coston)
- Dhoruba bin Wahad (a.k.a. Richard Moore)

A 22nd Panther defendant, Fred Richardson, was later named by Assistant DA Joseph A. Phillips. However, Richardson was soon dropped from the defendant list for having been expelled from the BPP more than a year earlier.

Prosecutors accused the "Panther 21" of planning three simultaneous attacks on Friday, January 17, 1969. According to the NYPD, sticks of dynamite were placed in the following locations:

Attack	Result
Bronx 44th Precinct police station	A police undercover agent replaced the real sticks with phonies, so that only a blasting cap exploded.
Manhattan 24th Precinct police station	The fuse on the sticks was improperly lit.
Queens Board of Education office	The dynamite blew a hole in the side of the building.

Near the 44th Precinct station, nineteen-year-old Joan Bird was arrested while two men with her managed to escape. The men left behind a long-range rifle. Police alleged the Panthers were intending to use the rifle to shoot policemen as they rushed out of the bombed precinct station.

== Incarceration ==
The New York Panthers were arraigned before Judge Charles Marks with bail set for each defendant at the steep amount of $100,000 ($877,949 today). The defendants could not make bail and so most were detained for months on Rikers Island, with the two women in the New York Women's House of Detention. Joseph A. Phillips from the District Attorney's Office led the prosecution, with Jeffrey Weinstein as his assistant.

During their incarceration, the "Panther 21" became a leftist cause célèbre. Many people and organizations publicly supported them and raised money for their bail and legal expenses. Abbie Hoffman helped bail out one of the defendants. Various New York City churches also raised bail money. The composer Leonard Bernstein and his wife Felicia hosted fundraising events for the Panther 21. Tom Wolfe wrote about one of these events in a famous 1970 New York magazine article, "Radical Chic: That Party at Lenny's", in which he coined the term radical chic. Years later it was reported that Lee Berry, whose case was tried separately from the other Panthers, was a prime catalyst for the Bernsteins' party. He urged Felicia Bernstein—who the week before had attended a fundraising party at director Sidney Lumet's house where Berry's wife Marva spoke about her husband's ordeals in prison—to put great effort into organizing a large gathering. The Bernsteins' party took place on January 14, 1970, and had 90 guests show up.

By March 1970, the BPP had raised sufficient funds to post bail for some of the leaders within the Panther 21, including Michael "Cetewayo" Tabor, Dhoruba bin Wahad, and Jamal Joseph. The FBI allegedly wanted the names of all donors who had contributed to the Panther 21 bail money.

Pre-trial hearings began on February 2, 1970, and dragged on for months. During that time, the prosecution determined that certain defendants, such as Lee Berry, should be tried separately. As a result, the original Panther 21 number was whittled down to 13. Although the case was officially known as The People of the State of New York v. Lumumba Abdul Shakur et al., it came to be referred to in the media as the "Panther 13 trial". The 13 defendants were: Sundiata Acoli, Joan Bird, Robert Collier, Ali Bey Hassan, Abayama Katara, Kwando Kinshasa, Baba Odinga, Curtis Powell, Lee Roper, Afeni Shakur, Lumumba Shakur, Michael "Cetewayo" Tabor, and Dhoruba bin Wahad.

== Trial ==
The trial started on October 19, 1970. Judge John M. Murtagh declared early on that "This is not a political trial; it is a criminal matter", but much of the prosecution's evidence was political in nature. During the court proceedings, District Attorney Hogan labeled the Black Panther Party a "terrorist organization". To educate jurors about the BPP's ideology, the prosecution read from Mao Zedong's Little Red Book; showed the film The Battle of Algiers; and attempted to introduce into evidence political posters and books on guerrilla warfare seized from the defendants' apartments.

Two of the defendants jumped bail and fled the country during the trial, mainly because they were under threat of assassination stemming from a dispute with the national BPP leader Huey Newton. Michael "Cetewayo" Tabor went into exile in Algeria and never returned to the U.S. Dhoruba bin Wahad traveled first to Canada, and then came back to the U.S. but lived "underground" for several months.

Afeni Shakur, pregnant with future rap artist Tupac Shakur, chose to represent herself in court despite not having attended law school, and despite facing a 300-year prison sentence. At a key juncture in the trial, she cross-examined NYPD Detective Ralph White, one of three undercover agents who had infiltrated the New York Panthers. She long suspected him of being an agent since he was frequently inciting others to violence. She got him to admit under oath that he and his fellow agents had organized most of the New York chapter's unlawful activities. She also got him to admit that he considered some of the BPP's efforts in the black community to be "very beautiful". Shakur asked Mr. White if he had misrepresented the Panthers to his police bosses. He replied "Yes". She asked if he had betrayed the black community. He again replied "Yes".

The revelations about undercover plotting by the NYPD were apparently impactful to the jury. One juror later said she used to be "a little afraid of the Panthers and not as afraid of the police. Now I'm a little more afraid of the police than I am of the Panthers."

The Panther 13 trial, which lasted from October 1970 to May 1971, was at the time the longest and one of the most expensive, if not the most, in New York history.

== Acquittal ==
On May 12, 1971, Judge Murtagh gave final instructions to the jurors. He told them that the flight of Michael Tabor and Dhoruba bin Wahad could be considered as evidence of consciousness of guilt. The jurors deliberated for only about 90 minutes before reaching their decision. They exonerated the Panther 13 on all 156 counts of conspiracy. When the verdicts were announced on May 13, the two defendants who fled were acquitted in absentia along with the others present in the courtroom.

One month after the verdict, Afeni Shakur gave birth to a son named Parish Lesane Crooks. In 1972, he was renamed Tupac Amaru Shakur. Altogether, she spent two years in jail before being acquitted.

== Aftermath ==
The surprising collapse of the prosecution's case prompted considerable post-trial discussion. For his 1974 book Perversions of Justice: The Prosecution and Acquittal of the Panther 21, Peter Zimroth conducted extensive interviews of 11 of the 12 jurors. He concluded that:

the prosecutor lost the propaganda war he started. He wanted to convince the jurors, and beyond them the public, that the Black Panther Party was dangerous.... He wanted the jurors to see the events charged in the indictment as part of a broader history of violence on the Left.... Instead, by the end of the trial, the prosecutor had convinced most of the jurors not that the defendants were dangerous, but that the District Attorney and Judge were.
