= House of Guitars =

American musical instrument retailer

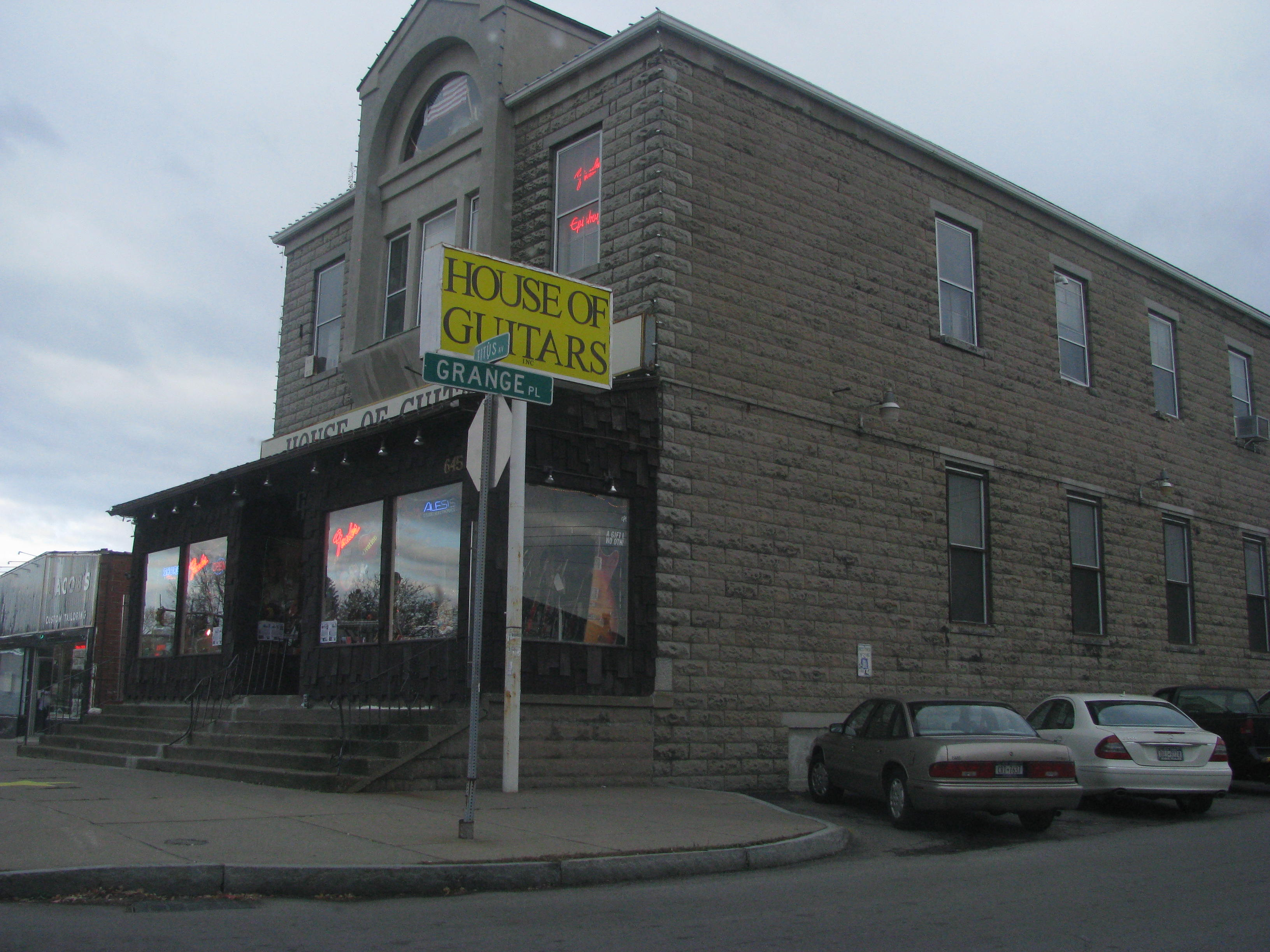
- The front of House of Guitars in 2008
- Industry: Retailing
- Founded: 1964
- Headquarters: 645 Titus Avenue Irondequoit, New York, United States
- Key people: Armand Schaubroeck and Bruce Schaubroeck
- Products: music, instruments, DVDs, posters, lessons, accessories
- Website: houseofguitars.com

House of Guitars, Inc. (shortened to the HOG) is a music and record store located in Irondequoit, New York. Billed as the "Largest Guitar Store in the World," it has a prodigious collection of new, used and vintage guitars, amplifiers and other musical instruments, a large collection of music recordings on vinyl records, cassette tapes and compact discs, music videos, T-shirts and other rock memorabilia. The store has gained a cult following over the years and many famous acts drop by the store when visiting the Rochester area. The store's slogan is "For the Rising Young Stars from Earth." An alternate slogan is "The Store That Ate My Brain." In numerous ads on late-night local television in the 1970s, the House of Guitars insisted, "The House Of Guitars Is Cooler Than Hollywood."

== History ==
The House of Guitars was initially founded in 1964 by brothers Armand, Bruce, and Blaine Schaubroeck in the basement of their mother's house in Irondequoit, New York. In 1972 the Schaubroeck brothers relocated the House of Guitars to its present-day location in the former Irondequoit Grange Hall building. at 645 Titus Avenue. Since the initial relocation in 1972, the House of Guitars has purchased three additional adjacent buildings for its music lessons, record shop, and musical instruments, interconnecting these buildings for means of expansion. This had led to what some consider a bizarre 'maze' like layout, where separate store rooms containing music related equipment are connected via long hallways, sharp turns, un-level floors, et cetera.

... '30 years of Cool' have taken a toll on the three-story stone building that once was the Irondequoit Grange Hall. The floors creak loudly under trampled carpeting, and so many bands have signed the walls that the messages are nearly illegible.

The store is said to have obtained the first Vox amps that came over to the United States. Schaubroeck had put in an order to Vox in England when The Beatles came to America, having known that George Harrison used Vox amps.

The House of Guitars continues to be owned and operated by the Schaubroeck brothers.

== Store layout ==
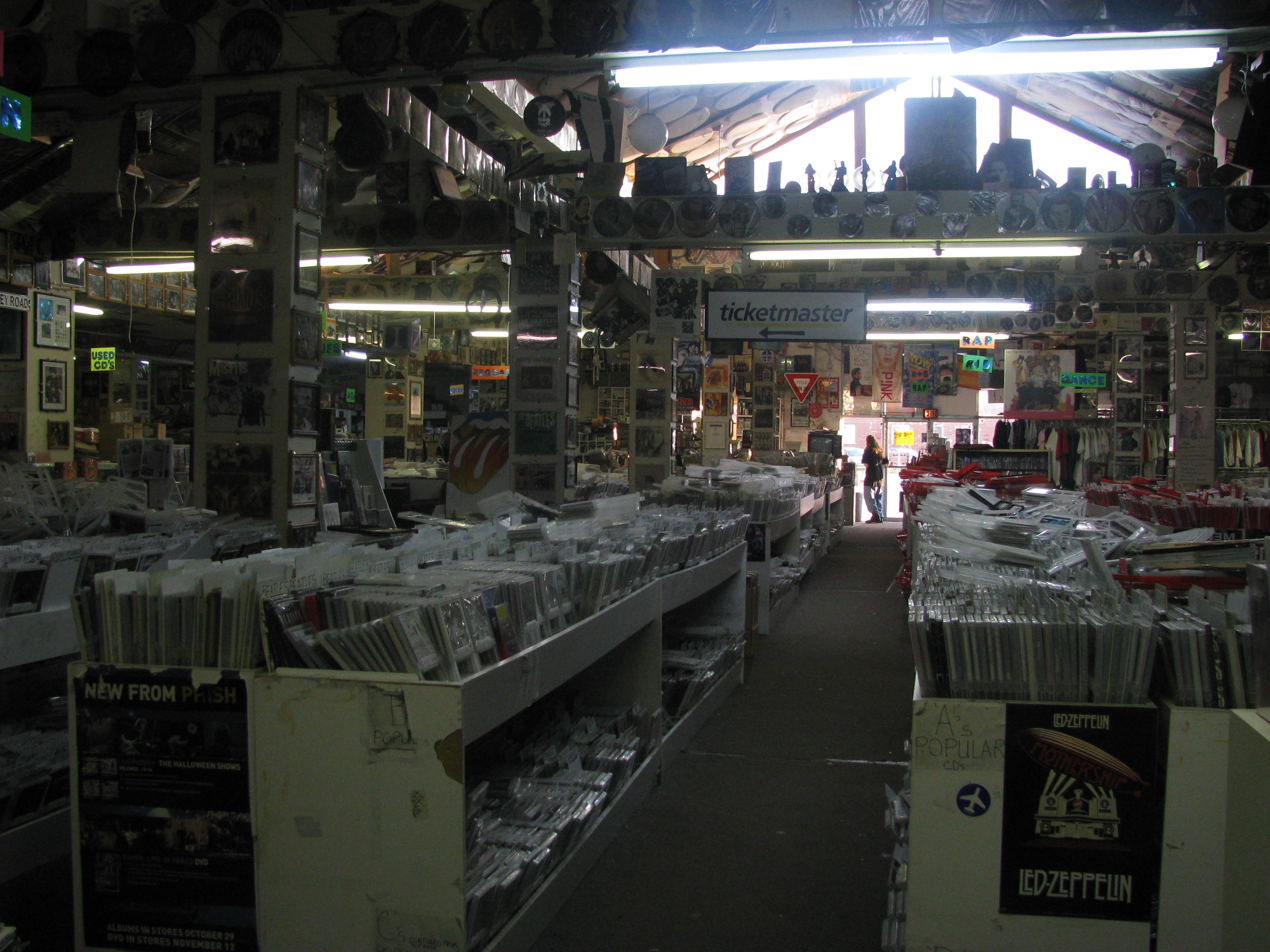
The interior of HoG.

The store is divided into two distinct sections: the front part, facing Titus Avenue, houses all varieties of electric guitars, acoustic guitars and bass guitars as well as drums, keyboards and amplifiers. The rear section, accessible from a back door near Grange Pl. or from the front through a short maze of corridors, houses the music collection.

At first sight, the music store appears as more of a rummage sale, with nearly everything arranged in a state of disarray, however, simply asking an employee for help is an option, as most employees know where everything is. In addition to music on CD, cassette and vinyl records, the store also sells videos, T-shirts, magazines, posters, music books and thousands of other rock memorabilia items. The angled ceilings are covered with signed photographs, posters, and drum pads, while the walls are covered in sharpie signatures from musicians who have visited in the past.

== Cultural impact ==
House of Guitars (sometimes referred to its abbreviation, the 'HoG') has appeared in several magazines. This includes an August 1997 issue of People magazine, which features a page-long article on Armand Schaubroeck and The House of Guitars. In this article, Schaubroeck is quoted as saying, "If you want a hard-to-find guitar, we can hand it to you in six or seven different colors."

One of the characters in the 1994 film PCU wore a House of Guitars T-shirt throughout the film.

The Wall Street Journal also published an article about the store on June 12, 1997. HoG also appeared in Details magazine as 'Top Guitar shop' in February, 2002. In 2008, it was named in the Top 200 Largest Music Product Retailers.

Several popular musical acts/bands have at one time or another shopped at the House of Guitars, including Metallica, Ozzy Osbourne, Mathew Sweet, Aerosmith, Jon Bon Jovi, The Ramones and Mötley Crüe. Many national acts stop in when they have gigs in the Rochester area and the store often holds events where fans can meet musicians for autograph signings and photo ops.

The House of Guitars has employed a non-traditional approach to commercial sales. One example of this is their bizarre surrealist early television commercial ads of the 1960s–1980s, shot on 16mm film which can still be viewed on local area television from time to time.
