= Pete O'Neal =

American activist (born 1940)

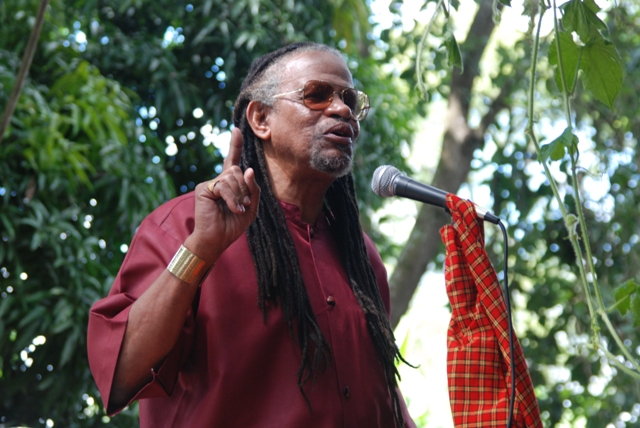
Pete O'Neal speaking at the UAACC

Felix Lindsey "Pete" O'Neal, Jr. (born 1940), is the former chairman of the Kansas City chapter of the Black Panther Party in the late 1960s. He led implementation of many free programs, such as providing free breakfast to children around the city.

== History ==
O'Neal had trouble with authority figures in high school and dropped out. Soon afterwards, he joined the military, following the steps of his father. Once done with service, he moved to Stockton, California, where in 1959 he was sentenced to 9 months in jail for theft. He escaped from jail after 3 months, traveling back to Kansas City, Missouri. In 1961, law enforcement caught him and he was sent back to California to serve his remaining sentence.

After completing his sentence, the felony should have been cleared as indicated by Californian law, but it was not. This significantly hindered his chances for employment.

According to Gary O'Neal, Pete's brother, who led Soul Inc in Kansas City, an activist organization, "in 1969, he (Pete) traveled to California to receive official permission from Black Panther Party leadership to form a chapter in Kansas City. Pete then became the leader of Kansas City’s Black Panther Party."

On October 30, 1969, he was arrested again for the transporting of a gun across state lines (under a law that went into effect just two weeks prior to his arrest). A year later a court convicted him and in October 1970, he was sentenced to four years in prison. O'Neal jumped his bail and fled to Algeria, where a number of other Black Panther Party members had also absconded to in the face of imprisonment in the United States. This group became known as the "International Section" of the Black Panther Party, and was centered around Eldridge and Kathleen Cleaver. A year later O'Neal moved on to Tanzania, motivated to immigrate there as the then president of Tanzania, Julius Nyerere, was both a Pan-Africanist and Socialist. O'Neal has remained in Tanzania ever since.

Together with his wife, Charlotte Hill O'Neal, he is the co-founder of the United African Alliance Community Center (UAACC) in the village of Imbaseni, near the northern city of Arusha, Tanzania. The UAACC is a center focusing on healing the community by providing a diverse array of free art, music, film and other classes to members of the community. The UAACC also serves as a hostel for people travelling through the area—offering several "huts" with bunk beds. The center has been frequented by several celebrities, American politicians, study abroad programs, students, documentary film makers, and artists. Pete and Charlotte provide numerous jobs to locals of the community and the center is entirely run by local Tanzanians.

O'Neal's family still resides in the Kansas City area. He is a third cousin to US Representative Emanuel Cleaver. Since 1991, Cleaver and others have unsuccessfully attempted to obtain a pardon for O'Neal, and took the issue to both President Bill Clinton and President Barack Obama. Both declined to pardon O'Neal.

His life and exile in Tanzania is the subject of the PBS documentary 'A Panther in Africa', by Aaron Matthews, and a book 'Black Panther in Exile: The Pete O'Neal Story' by Pete's attorney, Paul J. Magnarella.
