= Killing of Jonathan Diller =

2024 killing of a NYPD officer

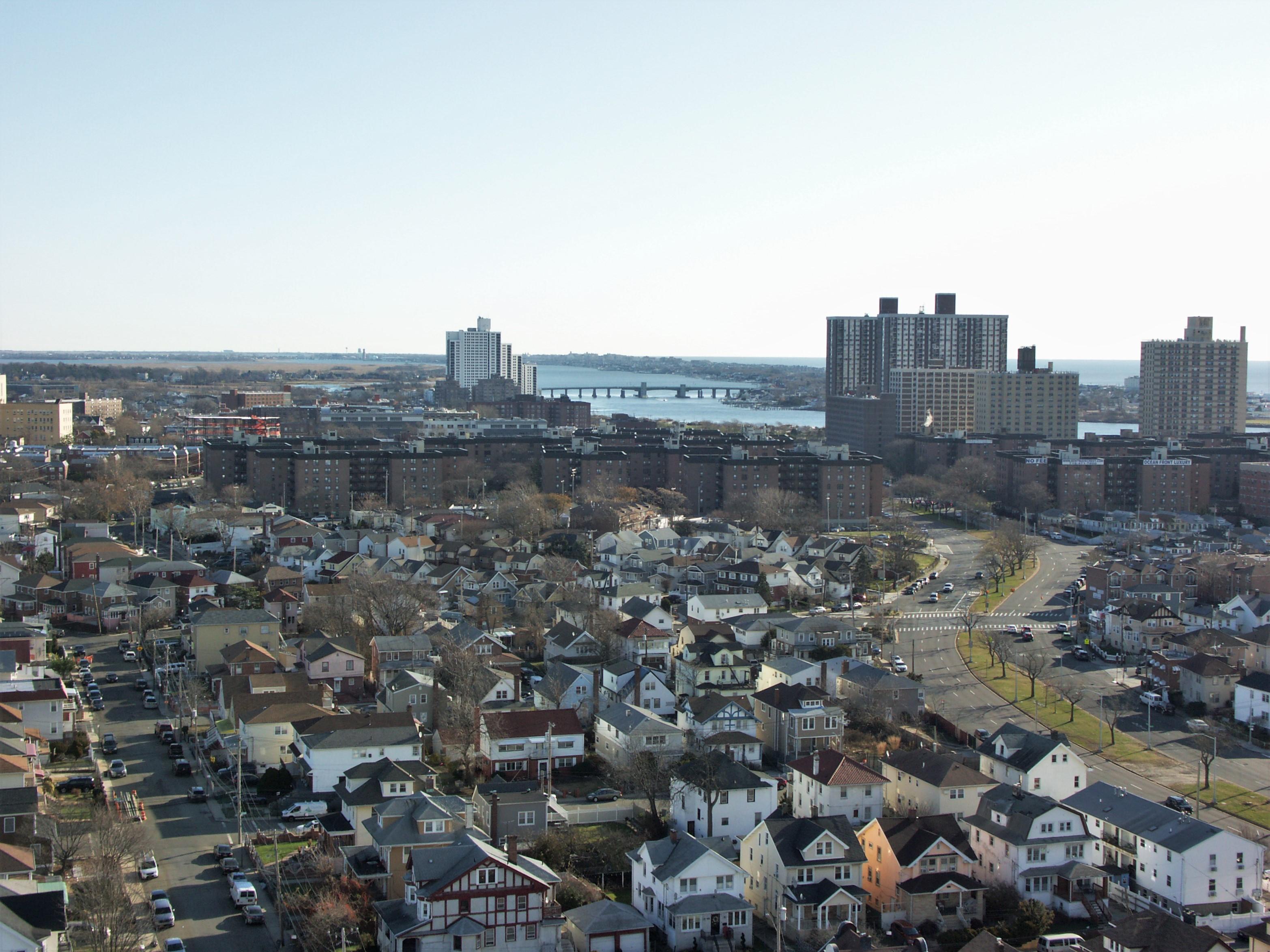
- Far Rockaway, the neighborhood in Queens where the killing took place
- Location: 40.60388°N 73.75229°W; 19-19 Mott Avenue, Far Rockaway, Queens, New York, U.S.
- Date: March 25, 2024; 2 years ago
- Weapon: Firearm
- Victim: Jonathan Diller

On March 25, 2024, New York Police Department (NYPD) officer Jonathan Diller was shot while conducting a traffic stop in Far Rockaway, Queens. He was subsequently transported to Jamaica Hospital Medical Center, where he died due to his injuries.

The killer, Guy Rivera, was shot on the scene by Diller's partner and hospitalized. He was later charged with murder, attempted murder, and criminal possession of a weapon. Rivera had 21 prior arrests, according to New York City mayor Eric Adams. The driver of the vehicle involved in the incident, Lindy Jones, was charged with weapons offenses. At the time of the incident, Jones had 14 prior arrests and was out on bail for a prior weapons offense.

This was the first killing of an NYPD officer in the line of duty since January 2022, when two officers responding to a domestic disturbance call were shot in a Harlem apartment building. Diller's killing generated widespread attention in New York City. His wake and funeral were attended by thousands of people, including various public figures. The lengthy criminal records of the suspects led to debate about the city's policies on crime and punishment.

== Shooting ==
Around 5:50 p.m. on March 25, 2024, New York Police Department (NYPD) officer Jonathan Diller and other NYPD officers approached a Kia Soul that was illegally parked at a bus stop on 19-19 Mott Avenue in Far Rockaway, Queens. Another police officer had reported seeing a man carrying a firearm in the front pocket of his sweatshirt enter the passenger side of the vehicle prior to this encounter, according to Queens district attorney Melinda Katz. Investigators believed that the occupants of the vehicle may have been planning to rob a nearby T-Mobile store.

The occupants refused to comply with police orders to exit the vehicle, according to the NYPD's chief of detectives, Joseph Kenny. Officers then attempted to remove the passenger, 34-year-old Guy Rivera, from the vehicle. At this point, Rivera shot Diller at point-blank range in the torso, below his bulletproof vest. Rivera then attempted to shoot another police officer, sergeant Sasha Rosen, but the gun malfunctioned. Officer Veckash Khedna, Diller's partner who was positioned on the driver's side of the vehicle, subsequently returned fire, striking Rivera in the back. Chief Kenny said Diller "stayed in the fight" and disarmed the shooter despite being wounded.

Within seconds of the first shot being fired, the driver of the Kia Soul, 41-year-old Lindy Jones, was removed from the vehicle and taken into custody. Diller was then helped into an unmarked car and rushed to Jamaica Hospital Medical Center. He underwent emergency surgery but died due to his injuries. He was 31 years old. Rivera was transported to the same hospital and received treatment for his injuries.

== Victim ==
Jonathan E. Diller was born on September 15, 1992. He was the youngest of three children born to Fran and Steven Diller, and grew up in Franklin Square, New York. He played hockey and lacrosse, and skied during his childhood. Diller attended H. Frank Carey Junior-Senior High School until 2006, when he transferred to St. Mary's High School in Manhasset. Diller led his high school team to a 2010 state championship in lacrosse. He then attended State University of New York Maritime College and graduated with a degree in marine transportation in 2014. He first gained employment in the shipping industry, and his job would often take him away from New York for weeks at a time. Diller married his wife Stephanie (née McCauley) in 2019 and they had a son in 2023.

Diller joined the NYPD in February 2021. After graduating from police academy, he arrived at the 105th Precinct. His first commanding officer, Inspector Igor Pinkhasov, said Diller adapted quickly and excelled on patrol in one of the precinct's busiest areas. He also played catcher for the precinct softball team. In 2023, Diller was selected to join the NYPD's Queens South community response team, one of the department's elite units. Pinkhasov recalled that Diller "was above and beyond everyone else, so that’s why I signed his paperwork and let him go to CRT." Diller made 70 arrests during his three years on the force, and was decorated three times for "excellent police duty". He was posthumously promoted to Detective First Grade by NYPD commissioner Edward Caban and given the shield number 110, in reference to his son's birthday.

== Suspects ==
The suspect who allegedly shot Diller was named as then-34-year-old Guy Rivera (born February 10, 1990) of Flushing, New York. Rivera also had ties to both the Long Island City and Woodside neighborhoods in Queens. New York City mayor Eric Adams stated Rivera had a lengthy criminal record with 21 prior arrests, including 9 felonies, dating back to 2009. He was arrested in 2011 for assault and robbery, and was sentenced to three-and-a-half years in prison after pleading guilty. He was arrested again in 2015, for possession of a controlled substance, and received a sentence of six years. He was additionally convicted of a hate crime for throwing feces and urine at correctional officers while imprisoned. He was released in 2021 after serving nearly five years. Rivera's mother, Keshia Gilyard, said Rivera was distrustful of law enforcement after his multiple prison terms.

Lindy Jones, who police stated was the driver of the Kia Soul, had 14 prior arrests, dating back to 2001 when he was charged with attempted murder and robbery in a case wherein he was accused of shooting a man three times. He was sentenced to ten years' imprisonment in 2003 in relation to that case, and was released in 2013. At the time of Diller's killing, Jones was out on $75,000 bail after being charged with second-degree criminal possession of a weapon for allegedly having a loaded firearm in Far Rockaway in April 2023.

== Investigation and legal proceedings ==
On March 27, 2024, Jones was charged with two counts of second-degree criminal possession of a weapon and two counts of third-degree criminal possession of a weapon. Prosecutors said a loaded 9mm pistol—a separate weapon from the one used in the shooting—was found inside the Kia, and that the pistol was "defaced, with the serial number scratched off." He potentially faces 15 years in prison for these weapons charges, as well as 15 years for the separate weapons charges from 2023. These terms would be served consecutively. Jones told police that he did not know Rivera, stating that he had picked up the alleged shooter as a hitchhiker. Due to a perceived risk of absconding, Jones was remanded without bail. At his arraignment on April 16, he pleaded not guilty to the charges.

After undergoing surgery for his wounds, Rivera was charged on March 28 with first-degree murder of a police officer, first-degree attempted murder, and criminal possession of a weapon. He faces life imprisonment without the possibility of parole if found guilty. Rivera is being represented by lawyers from the Legal Aid Society. According to prosecutors, an X-ray performed during Rivera's hospitalization discovered a shiv hidden in his rectum. Rivera suffered potentially permanent nerve damage as a result of being shot.

Jury selection in the trial of Rivera began on March 4, 2026.

== Reactions ==
Diller's killing led to an outpouring of grief from his fellow NYPD officers. NYPD Commissioner Edward Caban stated on March 25: "Tonight this city lost a hero, a wife lost her husband, and a young child lost their father. We struggle to find the words to express the tragedy of losing one of our own." Diller was the first NYPD officer to be killed in the line of duty since January 2022, when Jason Rivera and Wilbert Mora were fatally shot by Lashawn McNeil while responding to a domestic disturbance call in a Harlem apartment building. For Diller's funeral on March 30, thousands of police officers lined the streets as the hearse transported his coffin to St. Rose of Lima Church in Massapequa. In her eulogy, Diller's widow Stephanie called for the city to get tougher on crime and referenced the murders of Rivera and Mora. She said: “At the funeral for Detective Rivera two and a half years ago, his wife Dominique pleaded for change. That change never came and now my son will never know his father and I will grow old without my husband." She received support from other NYPD widows for her statement.

New York City Mayor Eric Adams addressed the killing in a press conference the day afterwards and mentioned recidivism and severe mental illness as problems in the city, also referencing another incident on March 25 in which a suspect with a long criminal history had allegedly killed a man by pushing him into the path of an oncoming train in an East Harlem subway station. Adams said: "It's the same people over and over again. These are bad people who are doing bad things to good people. It's the good guys against the bad guys and we have to recognize that." Patrick Hendry, president of the Police Benevolent Association of the City of New York, described the suspect who allegedly shot Diller as a "vicious career criminal" who "should have never been on the streets." Mayor Adams discussed his plans to aggressively tackle crime, but rejected notions that the city was "out of control" and stated crime rates in the city have decreased. He also spoke of his administration's efforts to expand Kendra's Law and "institute a process of removing those who are a danger to themselves and others".

The killing generated political debate. Some commentators, particularly Republicans, cited the killing as an example of lax public safety policies advanced by New York Democrats. Vincent Vallelong, president of the NYPD's Sergeants Benevolent Association, said in a letter to union members: "I’m sure that many elected officials will attend PO Diller’s funeral, shed a few crocodile tears, and prominently seat themselves for a good photo opportunity. The sad reality is we don’t want them there." The governor of New York, Kathy Hochul, attended Diller's wake and was confronted by a family member of Diller as she left. Hochul recalled that she "said prayers at the casket" and denied reports that she had been asked to leave, stating: "We were told the family is welcoming. We always check, and they said to come, and I went." Hochul has faced criticism for the state's bail reform dating back to when she was lieutenant-governor, and what Republicans perceive as soft-on-crime policies. Hochul has stated she has tried to reverse the bail laws: "everyone knows my positions on the bail laws. I’m the one who’s been trying to make the changes to go back to where it was."

President Joe Biden offered his administration's condolences to Diller's family, and contacted Mayor Adams regarding the situation. This was the first time Biden and Adams had spoken in over a year, amidst a conflict between the pair related to the New York City migrant housing crisis. White House spokesperson Karine Jean-Pierre described Diller's death as a "painful reminder of the toll of gun violence", and said Biden's administration has worked to address this issue. Former President Donald Trump, the presumptive 2024 Republican Party nominee who was born in Queens, attended Diller's wake at the invitation of Diller's family. He had previously spoken to the officer's family via telephone on the day after the shooting. In remarks made to reporters after the wake, Trump mourned the death of Diller and called the alleged shooter a "thug".

More than $2 million was pledged to Diller's family through fundraising efforts. Over $700,000 was donated through a GoFundMe campaign started by a member of the NYPD SCUBA team as of March 30. A further $750,000 was raised through a fundraising campaign by Barstool Sports, and the company's founder Dave Portnoy promised a matching donation. The Tunnels to Towers Foundation announced on March 28 that it would pay off the mortgage on Diller's home in Massapequa Park. The New York Islanders, a hockey team which Diller supported, observed a moment of silence for Diller ahead of their game against the Chicago Blackhawks on April 2, and announced that proceeds from the 50/50 raffle at the following game would be donated to Diller's family. It generated $152,659, the largest 50/50 raffle in the team's history.

== See also ==
- List of law enforcement officers killed in the line of duty in the United States
