= Ford Maverick =

Ford has marketed the following automobiles models using the Ford Maverick nameplate:

- The Ford Maverick (1970–1977), a compact car sold in North America and Brazil during the 1970s
- The rebadged Nissan Patrol Y60 sold by Ford Australia under the Button car plan from 1988 to 1994
- The rebadged Spanish-built Nissan Terrano II, sold by Ford of Europe from 1993 to 1999
- The European and Chinese version of the Ford Escape, sold from 2001 to 2005
- The Ford Maverick (2022), a compact pickup truck sold in the Americas
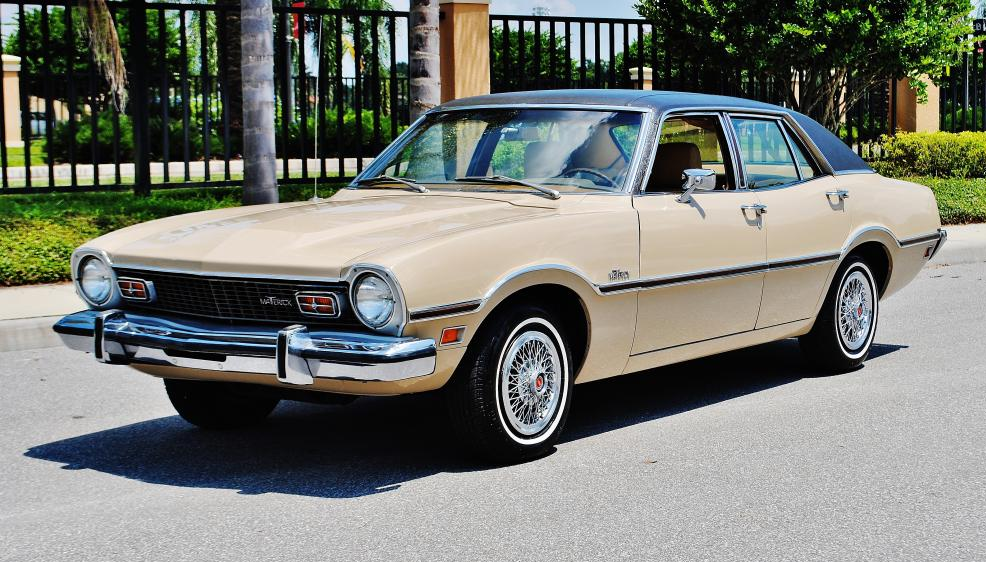
1970–1977 Ford Maverick

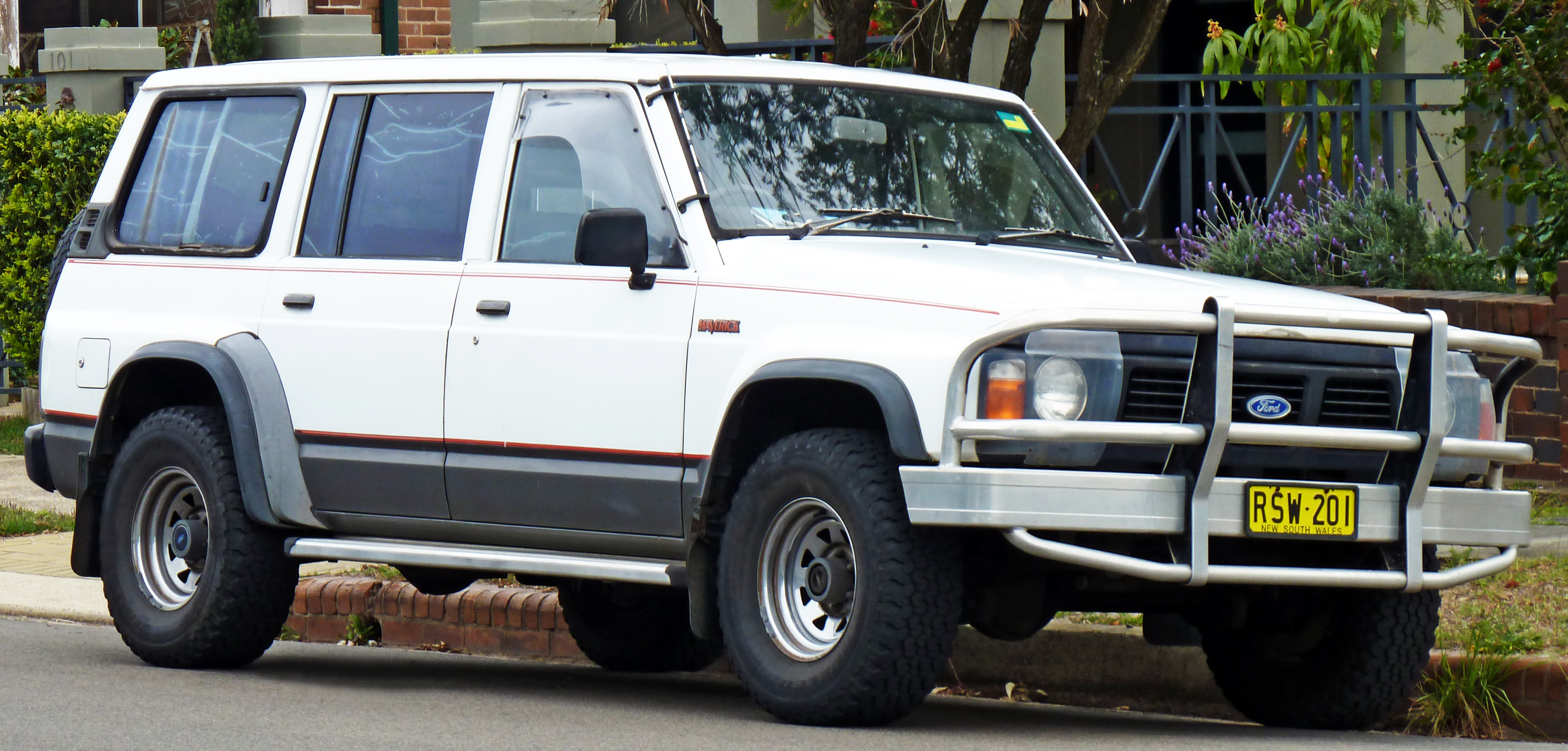
1988–1994 Ford Maverick

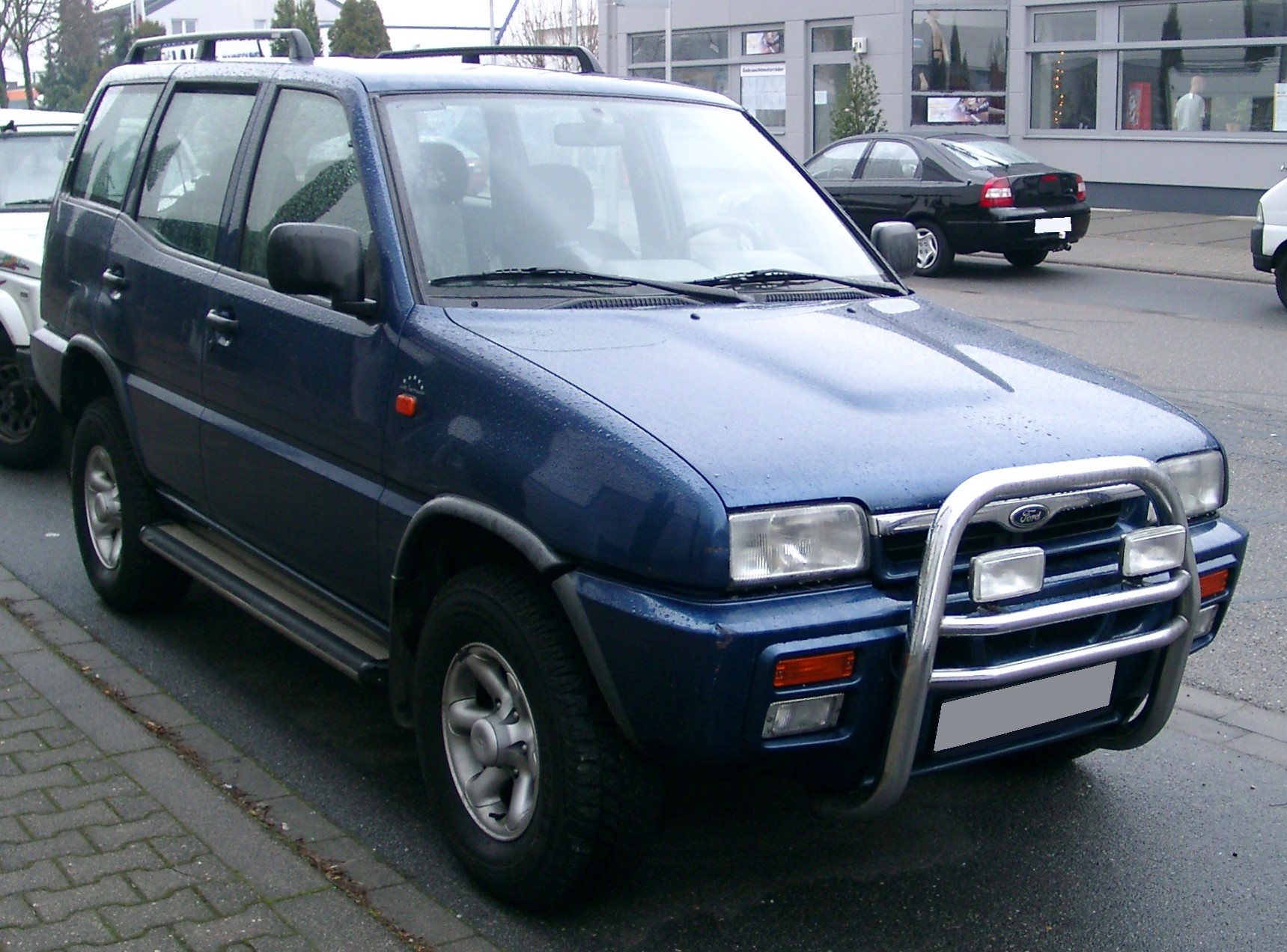
1993–1999 Ford Maverick

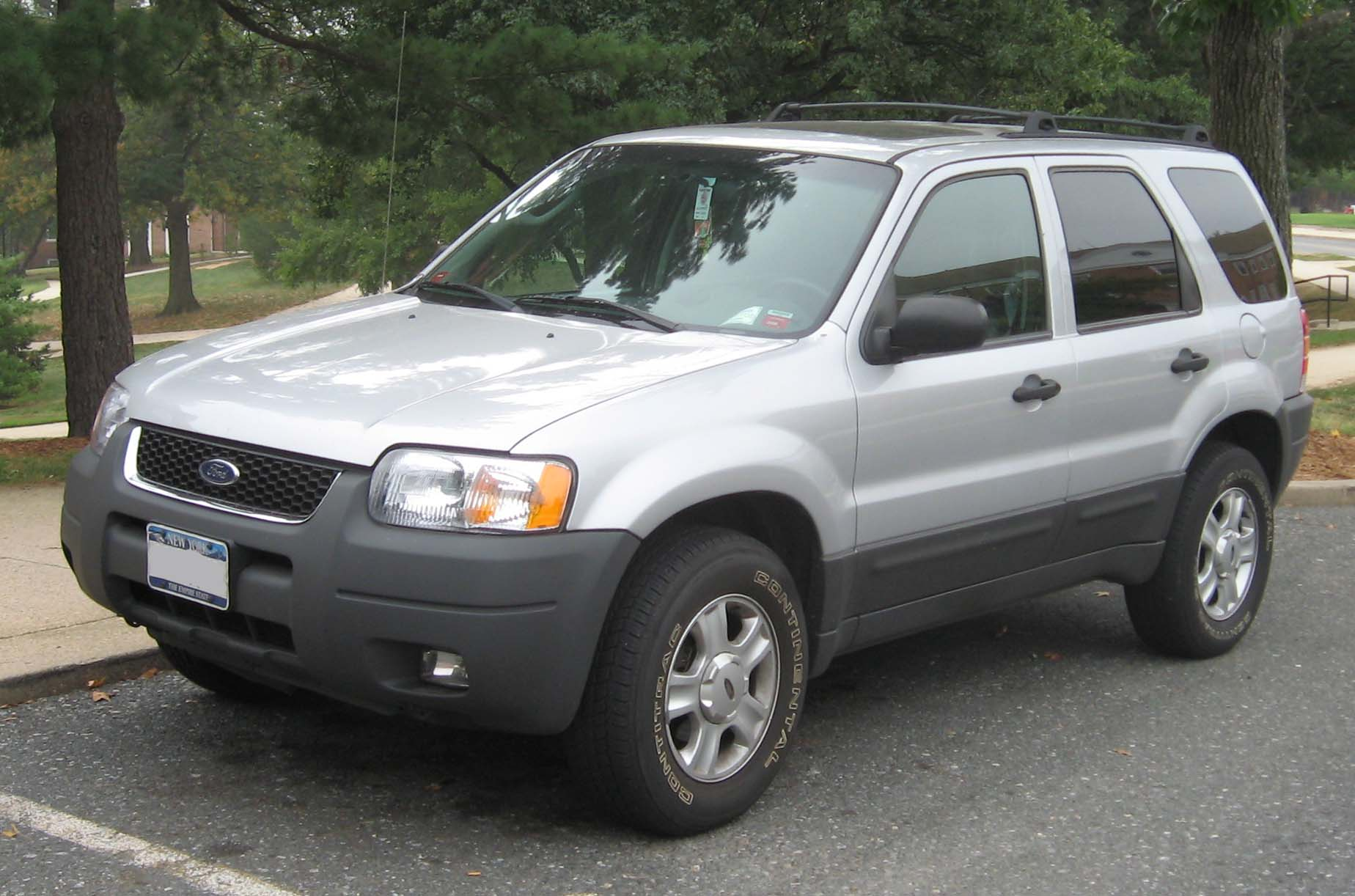
2001–2005 Ford Maverick

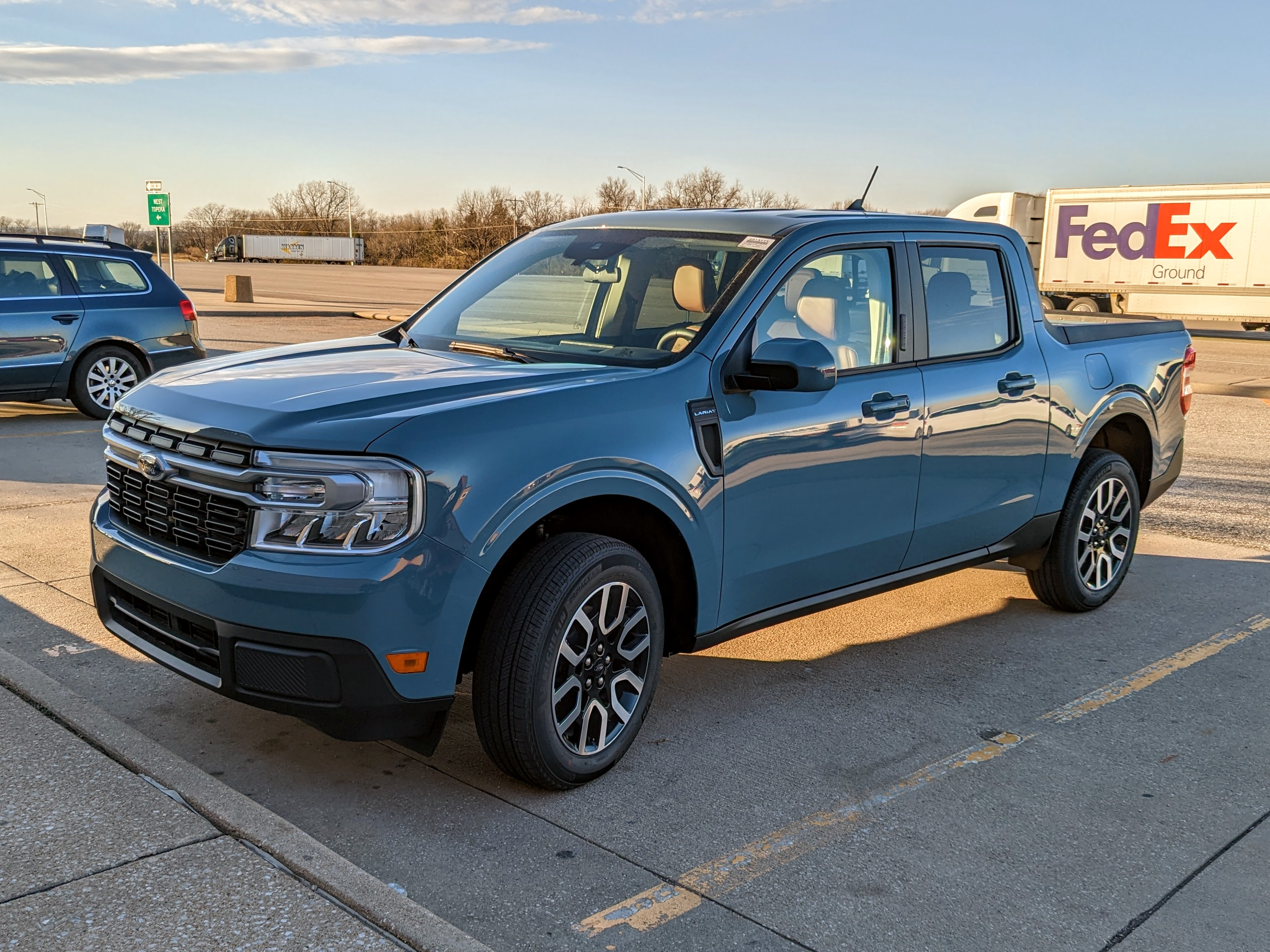
2022–present Ford Maverick
