= Offender workforce development =

Offender workforce development is comprehensive career-related services delivered to persons with criminal histories. Ideally, the services are provided through a collaborative effort involving public and private sector professionals and may include, but are not limited to, career exploration and planning, job readiness instruction, industry-driven education, occupational skill development, vocational technical training, and job placement and retention services.

When these services are delivered to incarcerated persons nearing release, formal agreements with community-based organizations are used to ensure a seamless continuity of assistance between jails, prisons, and the community to avoid duplication of effort.

Offender workforce development services have three major objectives:

1. Promote public safety by increasing the employment rate of persons with criminal convictions and decreasing the likelihood of their re-arrest.
2. Promote the economic well-being of a community by providing employers with a qualified, technologically competent workforce that can compete in the global marketplace.
3. Reduce the likelihood of inter-generational poverty by providing families of offenders with a sustainable income and a stable family structure.

To increase the effectiveness of practitioners who provide these services, the National Institute of Corrections partnered with the National Career Development Association to develop the Offender Workforce Development Specialist Training Program. The program includes instruction in the following areas: career development theory and application, understanding and using facilitation skills, the role of assessment in career planning and job placement, instruction and group facilitation, designing and implementing training and work development services, barriers to employment, ethics and the career development facilitator, transition interventions for the offender population, job seeking and employability skills, job retention, and the role of information and computers in career planning.

Offender Workforce Development Specialists use the competencies achieved in the instruction to assist offenders in making informed decisions about jobs and career paths, based on knowledge of their interests, skills, abilities, and values. Offender Workforce Development Specialists may work in settings such as prisons, jails, pre-release facilities, probation offices, parole offices, one-stop career centers, non-profit organizations, or vocational rehabilitation centers. Depending on work location, the Offender Workforce Development Specialist may be employed as a teacher, case manager, offender employment specialist, or job counselor.
