= Queens Detention Facility =

Federal prison in New York City

Coordinates: 40°39′26″N 73°45′54″W

- Interactive map of Queens Detention Facility
- Location: 182-22 150th Avenue Jamaica, New York
- Capacity: 222
- Opened: March 1997
- Managed by: GEO Group

The Queens Detention Facility (QDF) is a federal prison in the Springfield Gardens neighborhood of Jamaica, Queens, New York City, and operated by the private prison company GEO Group.

The facility opened in March 1997 under a contract between GEO Group and the U.S. Immigration and Customs Enforcement. When that agreement was not extended by ICE past its mid-2005 expiration, the United States Marshals Service contracted with GEO to house mostly pre-trial federal detainees here. The complex stands within an unmarked former warehouse in an industrial area adjacent to John F. Kennedy Airport, the entry point for many asylum seekers.

In 2020, press reports indicated the facility was most used to house prisoners who were cooperating with the government.

This facility is not to be confused with the Queens Detention Complex, a municipal jail operated by the New York City Department of Correction at 126-01 82nd Avenue, Kew Gardens.

== Controversy ==
The facility has a history of alleged civil rights abuses.

In late 1998 at least three inmates attempted suicide, and a number of frustrated asylum seekers engaged in a hunger strike protesting conditions and the length of their detentions. The case of Ghanaian refugee Adelaide Abankwah detained in QDF came to public attention in part because she had been incarcerated there for two years and five months. Abankwah's was one example of many extended detentions.

In 2004 more than half of the entire population went on another hunger strike to protest conditions. Local resistance to GEO's expansion plans in 2006 included a report that inmates were on 24-hour lockdown and had no access to exterior recreation. In 2009 two guards were convicted of covering up the beating of an inmate.

In December 2011 New York City Public Advocate Bill de Blasio (later elected Mayor of New York City in November 2013), along with three other city and state officials, called on the U.S. Department of Justice to end its association with the GEO Group. "This is not complicated: government should not do business with companies that violate basic human rights," de Blasio said.
