= Charlotte Hill O'Neal =

American activist (born 1951)

- Born: March 9, 1951 (age 75); Kansas City, Kansas, United States
- Other names: Mama C, Osotunde Fasuyi, Mama Africa
- Occupations: Community Organizer, Artist, Author
- Political party: Black Panther Party
- Movement: Black Power Movement
- Spouse: Pete O'Neal

Charlotte Hill O'Neal (born March 9, 1951) is an American poet, musician, artist and community activist. She is a founding member of the Kansas City chapter of the Black Panther Party who went into exile in Algeria and then Tanzania in 1972 after her husband Pete O'Neal was convicted of illegally transporting a weapon across state lines.

O'Neal is the founder and co-director of the United African American Community Center, later called the United African Alliance Community Center (UAACC), a non-profit NGO, with the goal of empowering black urban and rural youth in Imbaseni village outside the city of Arusha.

== Early life and education ==
O'Neal is from Kansas City, Kansas where she went to high school. She often skipped school to attend political education classes with the Black Panther Party in Kansas City, Missouri. As a student, she put pictures of Pete O'Neal on her wall and never dreamed she would marry him a few weeks after joining the chapter. She and Pete have two children together.

== Activism ==
At the age of 17, O'Neal became a member of the Kansas School of Human Dignity where she went around to churches and schools in the local community to speak about Black history.

Her husband was a target of the FBI's COINTELPRO program. He received death threats and was convicted of carrying weapons over state lines possibly in retaliation for his exposure of the FBI's plot to arm Ku Klux Klan members.

== Other work ==
O'Neal is a published author with two books of poetry. Her first poetry book titled Warrior Woman of Peace was published in 2008 and features poems on her personal experiences as a woman and on the women who have affected her life. Life Slices...a Taste of Magic was published in 2016.

O'Neal is also a musician with an album\ entitled "Together We Can" and appearances on recordings by artist WolfHawkJaguar and Nejma Nefertiti as part of the Afro Yaqui Collective.
