= Barbara Easley-Cox =

Civil rights activist

- Born: Barbara Easley
- Education: San Francisco State University
- Occupation: Civil Rights Activist
- Known for: Participation in the Black Panther Party
- Spouse: Donald L. Cox

Barbara Easley-Cox is a civil rights activist, best known for her involvement with the Black Panther Party. At the time of her first involvement, she was attending San Francisco State University. She now works in Philadelphia with a focus on literacy and education for youth.

== Work in the Black Panther Party ==
Barbara Easley-Cox became involved with the Black Panther Party in 1967 during her college years. Throughout her experience with the Party, she worked in the Oakland, California, Philadelphia, New York, and international chapters. She participated in the Free Breakfast for Children Program, collected apparel for the Free Clothing Program, and aided in other survival programs hosted by the Party. Easley-Cox traveled around the world, spreading chapters and involvement of the Black Panther Party to Algeria and Germany. In 1970, following Donald Cox fleeing to Algiers after being charged in connection with a murder case in Baltimore, Barbara joined him there for a time, where she partook in the work of the newly formed "International section" of the Black Panther Party. Later, she moved to Germany, where she worked with soldiers of color until 1973. In the 1970s she would move to Philadelphia and settle there. She became involved in Philadelphia's oldest anti-poverty organisation, the Advocate Community Development Corporation. By the 1980s she had been elected to its board and by the 1990s she was chairing the organisation.

== Family ==
Barbara Easley-Cox married her husband, Donald L. Cox in 1970 while working in Algiers. While in Algiers, Easley-Cox was invited to the Democratic People's Republic of Korea, where she gave birth alongside fellow woman of the Black Panther Party, Kathleen Cleaver.
