= Sekou Odinga =

American activist (1944–2024)

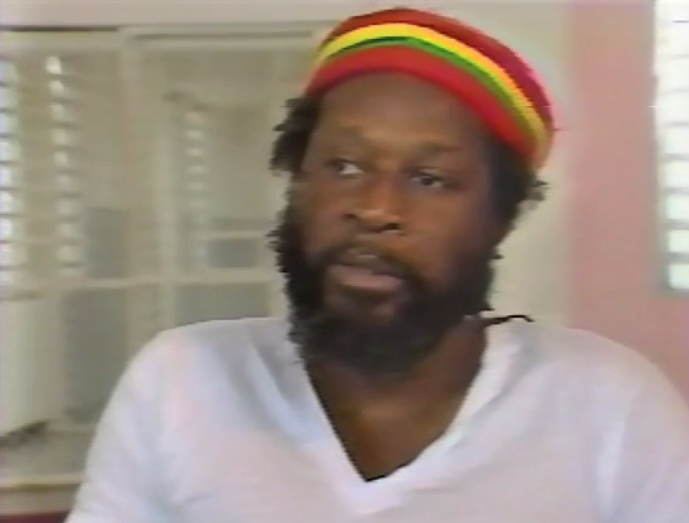
- Odinga in the late 1980s
- Born: Nathanial Burns; June 7, 1944
- Died: January 12, 2024 (aged 79)
- Occupation: Activist
- Organization(s): Organization of Afro-American Unity, Black Panther Party, Black Liberation Army
- Spouse: Dequi Kioni-Sadiki
- Children: 8, including Yaki Kadafi

Sekou Odinga (born Nathanial Burns, June 17, 1944 – January 12, 2024) was an American New Afrikan activist who was imprisoned for actions with the Black Liberation Army in the 1960s and 1970s.

== Background ==
In 1965, Sekou joined the Organization of Afro-American Unity (OAAU), founded by Malcolm X. After Malcolm's death, the OAAU was not going in the direction he wanted and by 1967 he was looking at the Black Panther Party. In early 1968, he helped build the Bronx chapter of the Black Panther Party. On January 17, 1969, two Panthers, Bunchy Carter and John Huggins, were killed by members of US Organization on the UCLA campus, and a fellow New York Panther who was in police custody was brutally beaten. Sekou was informed that police were searching for him in connection with a police shooting. The confluence of these events convinced Sekou to disappear from public-facing organizing and join the black underground with the Black Liberation Army.

Sekou Odinga remained underground, partaking in revolutionary clandestine activity for twelve years until his capture. Upon being captured in 1981, he was charged with six counts of attempted murder and nine predicate acts of Racketeering Influenced Corrupt Organization (RICO), stemming from his involvement in the escape of Assata Shakur from prison and the Brink's armored car robbery. He was convicted in 1984 and sentenced to a consecutive twenty-five years to life state sentence and a forty-year federal sentence. Odinga's convictions were affirmed by the United States Court of Appeals for the Second Circuit in March 1985. Odinga was released from prison on November 25, 2014.

== Personal life and death ==
Odinga died on January 12, 2024, at the age of 79. He is survived by eight children and 18 grandchildren. He was the father of deceased rapper Yaki Kadafi.

== Legacy ==
=== Books ===
- 1971: Look for Me in the Whirlwind
- 2017: Look for Me in the Whirlwind: From the Panther 21 to 21st-Century Revolutions
- 2025: Freedom Fighter: My Life As a Soldier in the Black Liberation Army

=== Documentaries ===
- The 90's - Season 3, Episode 10

=== Popular culture ===
- 2Pac mentions Sekou Odinga in the song, White Man'z World.
