= Haslip =

Haslip is a surname. Notable people with the surname include:

- Jimmy Haslip (born 1951), American bass player
- Joan Haslip (1912–1994), British author
- Katrina Haslip (1959–1992), American AIDS educator and activist
- Shearman Haslip (1897–1968), English first-class cricketer
- Wilbert Haslip (born 1956), American football running back

== See also ==
- Heslip, a surname
- Heaslip (disambiguation)
