= Heaslip =

Heaslip may refer to

== Places ==
- Heaslip, Ontario, a settlement in Evanturel township

== Patronyme ==
- Denis Heaslip (1933–2020), Irish hurler
- Fannie Heaslip Lea (1884–1955), American author and poet
- Jacko Heaslip (1899–1966), Irish cricket player
- James Heaslip (1900–1988), Australian politician
- Jamie Heaslip (born in 1983), Irish rugby player
- Mark Heaslip (born in 1951), American ice hockey player
- Richard Heaslip (born in 1932), British Royal Navy officer
- Violet Heaslip, a character in the PBS Kids show WordGirl

== See also ==
- Heslip
- Haslip
