= The Hill (book) =

2026 novel

- Cover of the 2026 Farrar, Straus and Giroux edition
- Author: Harriet Clark
- Publication date: 2026

The Hill is a 2026 debut novel by Harriet Clark.

== Background ==
The main character, Suzanna Klein, grows up with her grandmother and grandfather while frequently visiting her incarcerated mother. Although it is a work of fiction, the book incorporates elements that parallel the actual lives of Clark, her mother Judith Alice Clark, and her grandmother Ruth Clark. In the book, Suzanna Klein is an infant when her mother is involved in a bank robbery that leads to a homicide. She then struggles to find meaning in the world in which her mother is confined for life and her close relations are elderly. Beyond the plot of aging, the novel touches on themes of incarceration, prison–industrial complex, solitary confinement, self-delusion, and Jewish identity.

== Reception ==
In a starred review, Publishers Weekly stated, "Clark blends vivid Kafkaesque motifs with a whimsical coming-of-age narrative in her beautiful debut." Kirkus Reviews positively reviewed the novel, noting "Clark delivers a masterful study of internalized confinement and the quiet, fierce love that can persist within it" through "spare, luminous prose". Maureen Corrigan of NPR said The Hill's "plot is a marvel of sustained claustrophobic stasis...Suzanna's voice charges this novel with intelligence."
