= Donna Hylton =

Jamaican-American criminal, author

- Born: Donna Patricia Walden; Port Antonio, Jamaica
- Occupations: Author, activist

Donna Hylton is a Jamaican-American feminist, author, and activist. She was convicted at age 20 of murder in the second degree and two counts of kidnapping in the first degree for her role in the kidnapping, rape, torture, and murder of New York businessman Thomas Vigliarolo in 1985. Sentenced to 25 years to life, Hylton was paroled in 2012 after serving more than 26 years. Following her time in prison, Hylton earned a bachelor’s degree in behavioral science and a master’s degree in English from Mercy College, and now works as an activist, public speaker, and community health advocate for Mt. Sinai St. Luke’s. She is the author of the memoir A Little Piece of Light.

== Biography ==
=== Early life ===
In her memoir, A Little Piece of Light (2018), Hylton characterized the first 20 years of her life as "adult hands harming me instead of protecting me." During early childhood, Donna Patricia Walden lived in her birthplace of Port Antonio, Jamaica, with her mother, a devotee of Obeah, a spiritual practice of the West Indies. Hylton felt that her mother, who may have been bipolar, used her as a "real-life voodoo doll", and recalled, "It was routine for her to burn me with fire and cut me with a knife."

In June 1972, four months before Hylton's eighth birthday, her mother exchanged her for "a handful of money" from a childless couple, Roy and Daphne Hylton, who took the girl to live with them in New York City, where she acquired her adoptive surname. Hylton alleges that two years later, when she was 9, Roy Hylton began to sexually abuse her on a regular basis. During the summer of 1979, at age 14, she claims she was sexually abused by her math tutor.

Later that summer, she claims she ran away to Philadelphia with a man who lived in an upstairs apartment with his mother. Ten years older than Hylton, he raped her in a motel room. "Whatever part of me wasn't broken," she recollects, "is broken now." They remained together in Philadelphia for five months. "Sometimes, after he rapes me, he sits against the wall and orders me to crawl around the apartment on my hands and knees, like a dog. He stands up and urinates on my skin; he pushes the glowing tip of a cigarette against my bare leg." When he beat her, he said: "I'm a man, and I do what I want." In January 1980, they returned to New York, where Hylton discovered she was pregnant. Stunned at the news, Hylton claims the man responded, "No wonder you're pregnant, you're a whore!" Hylton claims he knocked her down and raped her. In February 1981, at age 16, Hylton gave birth to a daughter, a person nobody has found record of.

In the summer of 1981, Hylton was abducted by an older man whose previous advances she had rebuffed. She claimed he locked her inside a bedroom closet, after which he was joined by another man. When they pulled her out of the closet, Hylton recognized the second man as a minister at a nearby church but does not mention which church it was. The two men took turns raping her, then shoved her back in the closet, where she remained for three days. Once released, Hylton reported the crime to the police. She claims one of the responding detectives drove her to an unfamiliar location and also raped her.

In 1982, at age 18, Hylton allegedly married a 19-year-old rapper. She never clarifies which rapper. When she learned that she was pregnant again, the rapper and his mother talked her into terminating the pregnancy. Following her abortion, he asked for a divorce.

In 1984, Hylton went to work at a hotel gift shop in Times Square. In January 1985, a recently hired coworker introduced Hylton to the coworker's godfather, a man named Louis Miranda. In March 1985, Miranda enlisted Hylton in a scheme to recover money he believed had been swindled from him by a business partner.

=== Murder of Thomas Vigliarolo ===
On March 20, 1985, Donna Hylton and three female accomplices drugged and kidnapped 62-year-old Long Island real estate broker Thomas Vigliarolo at the behest of Louis Miranda, who thought Vigliarolo had cheated him out of $139,000 on a mutual con in which the two allegedly sold shares in New York City condos and pocketed the money. The kidnappers held Vigliarolo prisoner for 15–20 days. During that time, three men and four women, including Hylton, starved, burned, beat, sexually assaulted/raped, and tortured him. Among other acts, Vigliarolo had one of his testicles crushed, and was sodomized with a three-foot long steel pipe. According to her memoir, on April 5, 1985, with Hylton asleep in the next room, Vigliarolo died of asphyxiation. Three days later, his body was found locked in a trunk in a Manhattan apartment.

=== Trial ===
Delivering a ransom note and tape to a friend of Vigliarolo, who got a partial license plate number of the car she was driving, led to Hylton's capture by police.

At her trial, which began in February 1986, Hylton's legal defense was duress and coercion, arguing that she had been put into a position with imminent threat and participated only due to that threat. She said that Louis Miranda threatened to kill her then 4-year-old daughter if Hylton did not cooperate. On March 12, 1986, a jury convicted Hylton of second degree murder and two counts of first-degree kidnapping. Hylton was sentenced to concurrent indeterminate prison terms of 25 years to life.

=== Appeals ===
In January 1991, the New York Supreme Court, Appellate Division rejected Hylton's challenges relating to duress and found her other arguments "unpersuasive and meritless," noting that she had made an "elaborate confession, which was corroborated by ample evidence."

In April 2007, Hylton appealed to federal court to vacate her conviction on the grounds that (1) her Sixth Amendment right to confrontation was violated, (2) she received ineffective assistance of counsel in both the trial and state appellate proceedings, and (3) judicial impropriety and bias deprived her of her constitutional right to a fair trial. In November, the United States District Court for the Southern District of New York ruled that Hylton's petition for habeas corpus was untimely on its face, having been filed ten years after the effective date of the Antiterrorism and Effective Death Penalty Act of 1996 imposing a one-year statute of limitations. Consequently, the court dismissed her case without addressing Hylton's claims of judicial impropriety and bias and ineffectiveness of trial and appellate counsel.

=== Prison ===
Hylton's involvement in the high-profile case was the subject of a 1995 article in Psychology Today magazine written by Jill Neimark. While an inmate, Hylton earned a bachelor of science degree in the behavioral sciences from Mercy College (1994) and a master's degree in women's studies and English literature from Marymount Manhattan College (2003).

In 2011, she was ordained as a Christian minister.

On January 17, 2012, after serving nearly 27 years in Bedford Hills Correctional Facility for Women, Hylton was paroled.

=== Post-prison ===
Following her release, Hylton has advocated for the "humanitarian" release of aging prisoners.

In 2016, it was announced that Rosario Dawson was attached to a movie version of Hylton's life story, A Little Piece of Light. The film is in development, in search of a screenwriter and director.

In January 2017, Hylton was a featured speaker at the Women's March on Washington. During the speech, she refers to herself as “inmate #86G0206,” and spoke about issues facing women who are in prison.

In her memoir, A Little Piece of Light: A Memoir of Hope, Prison, and a Life Unbound, published in June 2018, Hylton expressed sympathy for her victim, a husband and father. "Even now," she writes, "half a decade after leaving prison, not a day goes by that I don't think about Mr. Vigliarolo. Not a day goes by that I don't think of his family, the fear they must have felt as they imagined him in fear, wondering where he was for eleven nights and worried for what he might have been experiencing.”

On August 20, 2020, the Democratic National Committee (DNC) included Hylton in a list of 22 of "America's most impactful community leaders" who participated in a video reading of the Preamble to the Constitution during a televised portion of the convention."

In 2023, Hylton’s work in criminal justice reform and her advocacy for formerly incarcerated women were the subject of the short documentary Finding the Light. Directed and shot by Brandon Haynes, the film explores her journey from incarceration to activism and highlights the impact of her nonprofit, A Little Piece of Light. The documentary was produced by Represent Justice and Guerrilla Wolf and has been screened at various festivals, further amplifying Hylton’s mission to support marginalized communities affected by the prison system.
