= Katrina Haslip =

American health activist and educator (1959–1992)

- Born: 1959; Niagara Falls, New York, U.S.
- Died: December 2, 1992 (aged 32–33); New York City, U.S.
- Known for: AIDS activist and educator, formerly incarcerated activist

Katrina Haslip was an AIDS educator and activist who played an essential role in the campaign to change the criteria for government recognition of AIDS to include the symptoms uniquely experienced by women. She co-founded AIDS Committee for Education (ACE) for women incarcerated at Bedford Hills Correctional Facility for Women and its counterpart ACE-OUT for women leaving prison.

== Early life ==
Haslip was born in 1959 in Niagara Falls, New York and was one of 12 children. She was Muslim.

== Incarceration ==
In 1985 Haslip was incarcerated at Bedford Hills Correctional Center for a pickpocketing conviction. During her incarceration she learned she was HIV positive though she did not know the source of the infection – Haslip was both a sex worker and the recipient of a blood transfusion prior to her incarceration. While incarcerated Haslip served as a law librarian and became well known by other incarcerated women. After observing terrible conditions for HIV positive women inside the prison – including segregation of HIV positive women to a decrepit infirmary unit – and the high degree of misinformation surrounding AIDS, Haslip co-founded ACE inside the prison in 1988 with other incarcerated women including Kathy Boudin and Judith Alice Clark to provide accurate education on living with HIV.

== AIDS Advocacy ==
Two weeks after her release from prison in 1990, Haslip broke her probation and joined women from ACT UP NYC to protest at the United States Department of Health and Human Services. The demonstration sought to pressure government agencies to include women in clinical trials of AIDS treatment and to recognize that HIV positive women displayed AIDS in ways that were unique from cisgender men – include pelvic inflammatory disease, persistent yeast infections, and cervical cancer. Also in 1990, attorney Terry M. McGovern filed a class action lawsuit against the Department of Health and Human Services to expand eligibility criteria for AIDS social security benefits. Haslip served as an advisor to that work and McGovern credits her advocacy in conjunction with the litigation as being instrumental to ensuring bacterical pneumonia was included in the Centers for Disease Control and Prevention (CDC)’s expanded criteria for AIDS along with cervical cancer in 1992. These expanded criteria are credited with increasing the number of women and intravenous drug users who were considered to have AIDS and eligible for disability benefits and laid the groundwork for further expansion to other symptoms exhibited by women. In an interview with the New York Times following the decision to expand eligibility, Haslip stated, "I am, and have been, a woman with AIDS despite the C.D.C. not wishing to count me. We have compelled them to."

Haslip also continued her work with ACE and founded a companion organization – ACE-OUT to assist formerly incarcerated women with AIDS navigate housing, medical care, and other elements of life after incarceration. She is prominently featured in the short video project I'm You, You're Me: Women Surviving Prisons, Living with AIDS in which she discusses her work a law librarian at Bedford Hills and the challenges of reentry after incarceration for women with AIDS. She collaborated with the producers Debra Levine and Catherine Gund on the project to ensure it represented perspectives of the women organizing and participating in ACE-OUT.

== Death ==
Haslip died of complications from AIDS on December 2, 1992, in Manhattan. As the CDC’s expanded definition of AIDS became active in January 1993 she was not officially registered by the government as dying of AIDS. However, her name does appear on the AIDS Quilt.
