= Captivated: The Trials of Pamela Smart =

- Film poster
- Directed by: Jeremiah Zagar
- Produced by: Lori Cheatle; Gabriel Sedgwick
- Cinematography: Naiti Gámez
- Edited by: Keiko Deguchi
- Music by: Zoë Keating
- Production companies: Hard Working Movies; Passion Pictures
- Distributed by: HBO
- Release date: January 17, 2014 (Sundance)
- Running time: 102 minutes
- Country: United States
- Language: English

Captivated: The Trials of Pamela Smart is a 2014 American documentary film directed by Jeremiah Zagar. The film premiered in competition in the category of U.S. Documentary Competition program at the 2014 Sundance Film Festival on January 17, 2014.

The film premiered on August 18, 2014 on HBO.

== Plot ==
The film tells the story of the 1990 murder of Gregg Smart and the subsequent New Hampshire trial and conviction, with gavel to gavel media coverage, of murderer Pamela Smart.

== Reception ==
The film received mostly positive response from critics. On review aggregator Rotten Tomatoes it has 63% rating based on 8 reviews, on an average rating of 7.2/10. Dennis Harvey, in his review for Variety, said that "This is all intriguing, and will especially fascinate those who weren’t around and overexposed to the case 20-odd years ago. But Zagar’s thesis — that overpowering media exploitation determined its legal outcome early on — is introduced in the very first shot, then hammered home harder the longer the pic goes on."

Duane Byrge of The Hollywood Reporter gave the film a positive review, calling it a "[s]mart indictment of the media’s sensationalistic influence on the murder trial of Pamela Smart." Beth Hanna from Indiewire in her review said that "Everything, from the nightly newscasts that feverishly covered Smart’s case to Zagar’s own film, is an edited story."

== See also ==
- To Die For
- Murder in New Hampshire: The Pamela Wojas Smart Story
