= Pamela Smart =

American convicted murderer (born 1967)

- Born: Pamela Ann Wojas; August 16, 1967 (age 59); Coral Gables, Florida, U.S.
- Occupation: Media services consultant
- Spouse: Gregg Smart (m. 1989; died 1990)
- Status: Incarcerated
- Motive: To be with an underage boy
- Convictions: Accomplice to first degree murder; Conspiracy to commit murder; Witness tampering
- Penalty: Life imprisonment without the possibility of parole

Details
- Victims: Gregory William Smart, aged 24
- Date: May 1, 1990
- Locations: Derry, New Hampshire, U.S.
- Date apprehended: August 1, 1990
- Imprisoned at: Bedford Hills Correctional Facility for Women, Westchester County, New York, U.S. (DOCCS #93G0356)

Pamela Ann Smart (née Wojas; born August 16, 1967) is an American woman who was convicted of being an accomplice to first-degree murder, conspiracy to murder, and witness tampering in the 1990 death of her husband, Gregory William "Gregg" Smart. Smart, then aged 22, had conspired with her underaged boyfriend, then 15-year-old William "Billy" Flynn, and three of his friends to have Gregg murdered in Derry, New Hampshire. She is currently serving a life sentence without the possibility of parole at Bedford Hills Correctional Facility for Women, a maximum security prison in Westchester County, New York.

== Early life and education ==
Smart was born Pamela Ann Wojas in Coral Gables, Florida, on August 16, 1967, the daughter of John and Linda Wojas. She grew up in Miami before her family moved to Derry, New Hampshire, when she was in the eighth grade. Pamela attended secondary school at Derry's Pinkerton Academy, where she was a cheerleader, and graduated from Florida State University (FSU) with a degree in communications, in the track entitled "Media Performance." At FSU, she was the host of a college radio program, where she called herself the "Maiden of Metal."

Pamela met Gregg Smart while she visited New Hampshire over Christmas break in 1986. They formed a relationship in February 1987 and married two years later, with Gregg moving to Florida to live with Pamela during her senior year at FSU. Seven months into their marriage, the couple began having difficulties in their relationship. Pamela took a job as a media coordinator at Winnacunnet High School in Hampton, New Hampshire, where she met sophomore student William "Billy" Flynn at Project Self-Esteem, a school drug awareness program where both were volunteers. Pamela also met another intern named Cecelia Pierce, who was friends with Flynn.

== Murder of Gregg Smart ==
On May 1, 1990, Pamela came home from a meeting at work to find her condominium ransacked and her husband Gregg murdered. Police officials said the crime scene looked like a disrupted burglary. Pamela was later accused of seducing 15-year-old Flynn and threatening to withhold sex from him unless he killed her husband. Flynn did so with the help of friends Patrick "Pete" Randall, Vance "J.R." Lattime, Jr., and Raymond Fowler.

During the investigation, Lattime's father brought a .38 caliber pistol he had found in his house to the police, believing it might have been the murder weapon. On May 14, an anonymous tip also indicated Pamela's friend Cecelia Pierce was aware of the plan. Police talked to Pierce, who agreed to wear a wire and record conversations with Pamela in hopes she would say something incriminating, which she did.

On August 1, 1990, Detective Daniel Pelletier approached Pamela in her school's parking lot. Smart recognized him, having spoken to him on at least six other occasions. Taken by surprise, she asked, "What's up?" "Well, Pam," Pelletier said in the recording, "I have some good news and I have some bad news. The good news is that we've solved the murder of your husband. The bad news is you're under arrest." "What for?" Smart asked. "First-degree murder." Smart was then handcuffed and arraigned at the Derry District Court and jailed at the New Hampshire State Prison for Women, which was in Goffstown at the time.

== Trial ==
Smart's trial was widely watched and garnered considerable media attention, partly because it was one of the first in the U.S. to allow TV cameras in the courtroom. She faced life in prison if convicted. The prosecution's case relied heavily on testimony from Smart's teenaged co-conspirators, who had secured their own plea bargains before her trial began.

When oral arguments began March 4, 1991, Assistant Attorney General Diane Nicolosi portrayed the teenagers as naïve victims of an "evil woman bent on murder." The prosecution portrayed Pamela Smart as the cold-blooded mastermind who controlled her underaged sex partner. Nicolosi claimed Smart seduced Flynn to get him to murder her husband, so she could avoid an expensive divorce and benefit from a $140,000 life insurance policy. In her testimony, Smart acknowledged she had what she termed an affair with the underaged boy, but claimed the murder of her husband was solely the doing of Flynn and his friends as a reaction to her telling Flynn she wished to end their relationship and repair her marriage. She insisted she neither participated in the murder plot nor had any foreknowledge of it. Though Flynn claimed he had fallen in love with Smart when he first met her, Cecelia Pierce testified at trial Smart and Flynn were originally just friends. Pierce first noticed a change about February, when Smart confessed to her she "loved Bill." Flynn testified at trial he was a virgin before he had sex with Pamela Smart.

After a 14-day trial that culminated on March 22, 1991, in the Rockingham County Superior Court, Smart was found guilty of being an accomplice to first-degree murder, conspiracy to commit murder, and witness tampering. The tampering stemmed from Smart's coercing Pierce to lie to authorities or not to say anything to them. The conviction was largely the result of the testimony of her co-conspirators and secretly taped conversations in which Smart appeared to contradict her claims of having wanted to reconcile with her husband and of having no knowledge of the boys' plot. She could have been charged with capital murder, but the prosecution decided against it. Later that day, she was given a mandatory sentence of life in prison without the possibility for parole.

== Imprisonment ==
Smart is serving her life sentence at the maximum-security Bedford Hills Correctional Facility for Women in Westchester County, New York, where she was transferred in 1993 from the New Hampshire State Prison for Women in Goffstown. At the time, New Hampshire officials said the transfer was for unspecified "security reasons." Co-defendants William Flynn and Patrick Randall were also transferred out-of-state, in both cases to the Maine State Prison in Warren, Maine.

The specific reasons for Smart's transfer are unclear. In 2007, a senior assistant in the state attorney general's office told the Keene State Equinox Smart was transferred due to discipline problems. While she had accrued 22 disciplinary reports, all but two of them were for minor offenses. Deputy Compact Administrator Denise Heath claimed at the time, there were fears the State Prison for Women was not suitable for a high-profile inmate like Smart, and it would be too easy for someone to break her out. However, New Hampshire has never had a formal transfer agreement with New York; Heath believed the transfer was a "commissioner to commissioner" arrangement. Smart's family maintains they were never informed of the transfer.

Although she maintained her innocence, Smart conceded her husband would still be alive if she had not had an affair with Flynn, a minor. While in prison, Smart has tutored other inmates and has completed two master's degrees with concentrations in literature and legal studies from Mercy College, which were paid for with private funds from Mercy College. Smart became a member of the National Organization for Women, campaigning for rights for women in prison.

In October 1996, Smart was severely beaten by two fellow inmates. She sustained a fractured nose and a broken eye socket, which resulted in the insertion of a plastic plate in the left side of her face. The two inmates beat Smart after they accused her of snitching on them about their prison relationship. They were both convicted of second-degree assault in the attack on Smart at Bedford Hills Correctional Facility and were subsequently transferred to separate prisons. As a result of the beating, Smart takes medication for chronic pain and sometimes thinks of suicide. Her counselor, Eleanor Pam, says "she has many, many, many dark days."

In 2003, photos of a scantily clad Smart were published in the National Enquirer. She filed a complaint against the prison and was placed in solitary confinement for two months. Smart sued in relation to her placement in solitary, but the lawsuit was dismissed. In 2004, Smart and fellow inmate Carolyn Warmus sued officials of Bedford Hills, claiming sexual harassment, and sexual assault by a corrections officer, who they said coerced them into posing for the suggestive pictures published in 2003. On November 5, 2009, a U.S. District Court Judge approved a $23,875 judgment to Smart from the State of New York. Smart received $8,750, while her attorney received the remaining balance for attorney fees.

While serving her sentence, Smart took part in a writer's workshop, which was facilitated by playwright Eve Ensler. The workshop and Smart's writing were exhibited in the 2003 PBS documentary What I Want My Words to Do to You.

Smart has filed a series of appeals, on a number of legal issues, including arguments that the media had influenced her trial and conviction, as she explained in the 2014 HBO documentary Captivated: The Trials of Pamela Smart.

In April 2004, the First U.S. Court of Appeals upheld a 2002 ruling by a federal judge who rejected her federal habeas petition. Prior to her federal appeal, Smart had exhausted all judicial appeals at the state level. In July 2005, the New Hampshire Executive Council unanimously denied a pardon request for "any conditions the governor may seek to impose." In a December 2007 interview with ABC News, Smart indicated she is afraid of growing old and dying in prison and would rather have been given the death penalty.

On March 29, 2023, it was reported Smart lost her final appeal.

Since her conviction, Smith's lawyers have also submitted a series of requests, to various Governors of New Hampshire for a commutation hearing, all of which have been denied. After her third request was denied in 2022, her lawyers filed a motion to the New Hampshire Supreme Court asking that the Court reverse then-governor Chris Sununu's decision to deny her request; in March 2023, the Court denied her motion, as commutations are a political action, not a court mandated action.

Smart says she still keeps track of Flynn because she regards him as being the key to her freedom, before the 2023 ruling. "He is one of the few people that could actually get me out of here, by coming forward and telling the truth, but he's never gonna do that," said Smart.

On June 11, 2024, as part of an effort to get a sentence reduction, a videotaped statement was released where for the first time ever, Smart admitted responsibility for her husband's death by asserting she should have "seen the signs", with regard to her allegation Flynn's actions were of his own volition. She claimed it was done as part of some inner work she was doing on herself.

In May 2025, Smart's first request for a commutation hearing following her 2024 admission of responsibility, was denied by then-governor Kelly Ayotte.

In September 2026, another appeal was denied.

== Conspirators ==
In 1992, Bill Flynn was sentenced to life in prison for second degree murder; not eligible for parole for 40 years with 12 years of the minimum sentence deferred if he maintains good behavior. Flynn was incarcerated at the Maine State Prison in Warren, where he earned his GED, has been active in charity work and worked as an electrician at the prison. In 2007, Flynn sought a sentence reduction after serving 16 years, stating he had vowed not to do so until he had spent as many years behind bars as he had spent free. He also apologized to Gregg Smart's family for murdering him. The Smart family opposed the request. On February 12, 2008, the request was denied, although Flynn's earliest parole eligibility date was reduced by three years to 25 years, making him eligible for parole in 2015. In July 2014, Flynn was moved to a minimum security facility in Warren, Maine; the transfer allowed him to participate in a work-release program.

Flynn was granted parole by the state parole board on March 12, 2015, and was released from prison with lifetime parole on June 4, 2015, a few days past the 25th anniversary of Gregg Smart's death.

Like Flynn, Patrick Randall was also sentenced to life in prison for second-degree murder, eligible for parole after 40 years with 12 years deferred, making him eligible as early as 2018. He too served his sentence at the Maine State Prison in Warren, Maine. In March 2009, a judge reduced Randall's minimum sentence by three years to 25 years, making him eligible for release as early as June 2015. Randall was granted parole by the New Hampshire Parole Board after a hearing on April 9, 2015. He was released on June 4, 2015, on lifetime parole, the same day as co-conspirator Flynn's release .

Conspirator and driver Vance Lattime was sentenced to life in prison as an accomplice to second-degree murder, eligible for parole after 30 years with 12 years suspended. In 2005, his minimum sentence was reduced by three years, and he was released on lifetime parole that same year. In 2023, Lattime was denied a sentence reduction that would have seen his parole end.

Conspirator Raymond Fowler (who waited in the car during the killing) was sentenced to 30 years for conspiracy to murder and attempted burglary, with parole eligibility after 15 years. Fowler was paroled in 2003, but was sent back to prison in 2004 for violating his parole terms. He was paroled again in June 2005.

== Pop culture and in media ==
=== Books ===
- The case was the subject of several true crime books, including Teach Me To Kill (ISBN 978-0380766499) and Deadly Lessons (ISBN 978-0312927615).
- The case was featured in the books Till Death Do Us Part (ISBN 978-1416523130), about murderous spouses, Evil Women (ISBN 978-1788284660), about women who commit murder, and American Murder (ISBN 978-1788284660), which compares media portrayals of famous crimes with the facts.
- Dean J. Smart, brother of murder victim Gregg Smart, released his memoir Skylights and Screen Doors (ISBN 978-1-936680023), on April 7, 2011.
- Joyce Maynard drew several elements from the case for her 1992 novel To Die For (ISBN 978-0451186072).
- The character of Becky Burgess in feminist writer Marge Piercy's novel The Longings of Women (ISBN 978-0449909072) was inspired by Pamela Smart and the conspiracy to kill Greggory Smart.

=== Television and movies ===
- The case was the basis for the NBC Television crime and drama series Law & Order Season 2, Episode 9 "Renunciation", originally aired November 19, 1991.
- The trial was the basis of the television movie Murder in New Hampshire: The Pamela Wojas Smart Story, starring Helen Hunt and Chad Allen, released 1991.
- Joyce Maynard's novel was adapted by Buck Henry for Gus Van Sant's 1995 movie To Die For, starring Nicole Kidman and Matt Dillon as the fictional wife and husband, and Joaquin Phoenix as the wife's underaged sex partner.
- Reel Crime/Real Story a short lived crime documentary series from the Investigation Discovery channel, detailed crimes that became the basis for movies. Smart's crimes are detailed in the episode titled "To Die For" Season 1, Episode 3, originally aired: June 12, 2012.
- The crime series American Justice played an episode on the case: "Crime of Passion: The Pamela Smart Story", aired May 25, 1996.
- The murder was parodied in an episode of the animated sitcom Family Guy, "Fast Times at Buddy Cianci Jr. High", season 4, episode 2, aired May 8, 2005.
- Snapped, an American true crime television series, dedicated its 13th episode in the second season (2005) to the case.
- The case is referenced on Psych, on the Season 5 episode "Dual Spires", where a character is said to be "pulling a Pamela Smart" after she has allegedly killed a teenage girl while having a sexual relationship with an underage boy, aired December 1, 2010.
- Smart appeared on Oprah on October 22, 2010. On the show, Smart claimed she was innocent and believes her sentence for life in prison is too harsh.
- Scorned: Love Kills, a series on the Investigation Discovery channel, dedicated the Season 1, Episode 4 titled "Hot For Teacher" to the story on February 11, 2012.
- The HBO documentary Captivated: The Trials of Pamela Smart was directed by Jeremiah Zagar, aired August 14, 2014.
- The USA Network series Corrupt Crimes, which investigates crime stories and interviews experts to analyze a wide variety of cases, dedicated an entire episode to Pamela Smart's upbringing, career and murder trial in Season 1, Episode 62, entitled "From Student Seduction to Murder", which aired on February 19, 2016.
- The Reelz Network series Murder Made Me Famous, a fact-based crime documentary series, aired the Season 2, Episode 1 titled "Pamela Smart" on March 19, 2016.
- The Oxygen Network series Snapped: Killer Couples, reveals couples whose attractions lead them to carry out crimes, released an episode of Smart and Flynn's case on Season 6, Episode 10, entitled "Pamela Smart & William Flynn", which aired on December 13, 2016.
- In August 2018, the Investigation Discovery channel released a three-part program titled Pamela Smart: An American Murder Mystery, with a total run-time of 127 minutes:
- In 2019, on French Chérie 25 channel: Snapped: les couples tueurs Episode 20 "Smart & Flynn"
- In 2021, the case was featured on Investigation Discovery's Deadly Women in the episode "Killer Intellect."
- In 2021, the case was featured on Dateline, Season 5, Episode 1, titled “Deadly Secret."
