= August Rebellion =

1974 rebellion at Bedford Hills Correctional Facility

The August Rebellion was an uprising on August 29, 1974, at the Bedford Hills Correctional Facility for Women, a New York State prison in Bedford Hills in the Town of Bedford, Westchester County, New York, United States. In August 1974, about 200 women imprisoned at Bedford Hills rebelled, taking over parts of the prison, in protest of the inhumane treatment of Carol Crooks. A subsequent civil-action lawsuit, decided in the inmates' favor, led to greater protections of Fourth Amendment (due process) rights for incarcerated people.

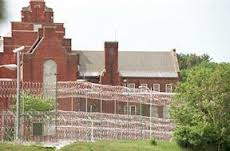
The Bedford Hills Correctional Facility for Women in Bedford Hills, New York.

== Causes and catalyst ==
Crooks filed a lawsuit challenging the placement of women in solitary confinement without a 24-hour notice of prison disciplinary charges, hearings, and the reason for the punishment. This lawsuit was filed in July 1974 because the guards at Bedford Hills had placed prisoners into the special housing units (solitary confinement) for reasons that were not fair or just, or without giving any reason at all. In August of the same year, after the judges who heard Crooks' case ruled in her favor, the prison guards retaliated by beating her and putting her in a segregated cell. The actions of these guards resulted in the uprising in the prison by about two hundred inmates. These inmates took action by fighting the guards and for about two and a half hours they were in control of parts of the prison.

== Leaders of the uprising ==
Carol Crooks became the poster child for prisoners' rights in the August Rebellion. Crooks was incarcerated at the Bedford Hills Correctional Facility at age 18, jailed originally for first degree manslaughter and sentenced to 15 years in 1972. Crooks had had a difficult childhood, with the death of her father and having to provide for her sister and mother. She was arrested and charged with manslaughter after killing a worker of her heroin distribution ring. The worker allegedly blackmailed her and, later, police found him dead by a gunshot wound. While in prison Crooks met Cidney Reed, and the two became lovers. Reed, then 16, was serving a five-year sentence for robbery. When Crooks was in solitary confinement, Reed helped rally up female inmates and started the rebellion against officers. Along with Reed, another important leader was Dollree Mapp, who was known as the “Rosa Parks for the Fourth Amendment.” Mapp refused to let officers into her home without a search warrant and sued in the Mapp v. Ohio case. The case decided that evidence seized illegally from criminal prosecution could not be used in court.

== Legal impact ==
The August Rebellion led to greater protection of the rights of incarcerated people in the United States. Following the prison riot the women filed and won the class-action lawsuit Powell v. Ward. This lawsuit ended in a legally binding pledge by prison guards to conduct disciplinary proceedings fairly and to only send truly mentally ill prisoners to psychiatric hospitals. After an eight-year long legal battle, an out-of-court settlement was reached in U.S. District Court and the plaintiffs were also awarded a fund of $127,000 to be controlled by an inmate committee. The inmates used this fund for educational and training programs, word processors, and funding for legal services. In addition, the uprising led to the replacement of the prison administration. Although these women have contributed to fairness in the prison system, the event also led to mandatory inserts of male correctional officers in female prisons, which has contributed to the sexual exploitation of incarcerated women.
