= Heslip =

Heslip is a surname. Notable people with the surname include:

- Brady Heslip (born 1990), Canadian basketball player
- Herbert Heslip (1913–1992), Northern Irish politician

== See also ==
- Haslip, a surname
- Heaslip (disambiguation)
