= Nicole Addimando =

American woman (born 1988)

Nicole "Nikki" Addimando (born November 19, 1988) is an American woman who was convicted of second-degree murder for shooting and killing her domestic partner, Christopher Grover in Poughkeepsie, New York. Addimando maintained that Grover had subjected her to prolonged domestic violence. Originally sentenced to 19 years to life, Addimando's term of imprisonment was reduced on appeal to 7.5 years. Released in January 2024, she was incarcerated at Bedford Hills Correctional Facility for Women.

Addimando said that her partner, Christopher Grover, had beat and raped her for years, and she provided photographs and other materials she said documented this abuse. She further claimed that she shot Grover while he sat on their couch after he had threatened her with the gun. Grover's family disputed Addimando's abuse claims, and prosecutors argued that Grover had been shot while he was asleep. A medical examiner found no proof that Grover had been asleep when he was shot.

Addimando was ultimately convicted of second degree murder and second degree criminal possession of a handgun.

== Background ==
The couple met in 2008, when Nicole was 19 and Christopher 21, at a gym where they were both employed as gymnastics teachers. In 2012, after Nicole became pregnant, they moved in together in Salt Point, New York. In 2013, Nicole alleges, Christopher began to force Nicole to have sex with him, and if she refused, he would attack her violently. A second child was born in February 2015, and according to Nicole, Christopher continued to violently abuse her. He also filmed the abuse and uploaded the videos to PornHub without her consent. In November 2015, Family Services contacted Jason Ruscillo, a detective from Hyde Park. In preparation for the meeting, Sarah Caprioli of Family Services prepared an affidavit describing the abuse Addimando had told Caprioli about, but Addimando was too afraid of retaliation to sign it.

In September 2017, Addimando told a police officer that she tried to run away from Grover, but he threatened to kill her. There had been a fight, and Addimando shot and killed Grover.

== Sentence reduction ==
In 2019, New York passed a law—the Domestic Violence Survivors Justice Act—that authorized reductions in sentences for domestic-violence survivors when the abuse they suffered "was a significant contributing factor to the defendant's criminal behavior." Judge Edward McLoughlin originally ruled that Addimando's case did not meet the requirements of a reduced sentence because, according to the judge, she could have left her abuser. An appeals court disagreed and reduced Addimando's sentence to 7.5 years.

Upon our extensive review of the evidence, we reject the County Court's methodology, approach, application, and analysis of the three factors . . . set forth under [the DVSJA]. . . .
. . . .
Basically, the court premised its analysis on a presumption or notion that the defendant could have avoided further abuse at the hands of Grover. We will not engage in any such presupposition. The evidence, which included a detailed history of repeated sexual, physical, and psychological abuse by Grover against the defendant, expert testimony regarding the impact of that abuse on the defendant, and the defendant's testimony regarding the events prior to the subject shooting, established that the abuse was a significant contributing factor to the defendant's criminal behavior.

— People v. Addimando, New York Court of Appeals

== Clemency effort ==
In November 2021, Addimando filed a clemency application, attaching a petition in support of application with 30,000 signatures. A separate petition supporting Addimando's clemency push amassed 579,000 signatures. Governor Kathy Hochul never responded to the clemency petition, and two years in a row granted clemency to other individuals, but not Addimando.

== Release ==
Addimando was released from prison on January 4, 2024.
