= Joseph Clark (journalist) =

American Communist Party member and foreign editor at the Daily Worker

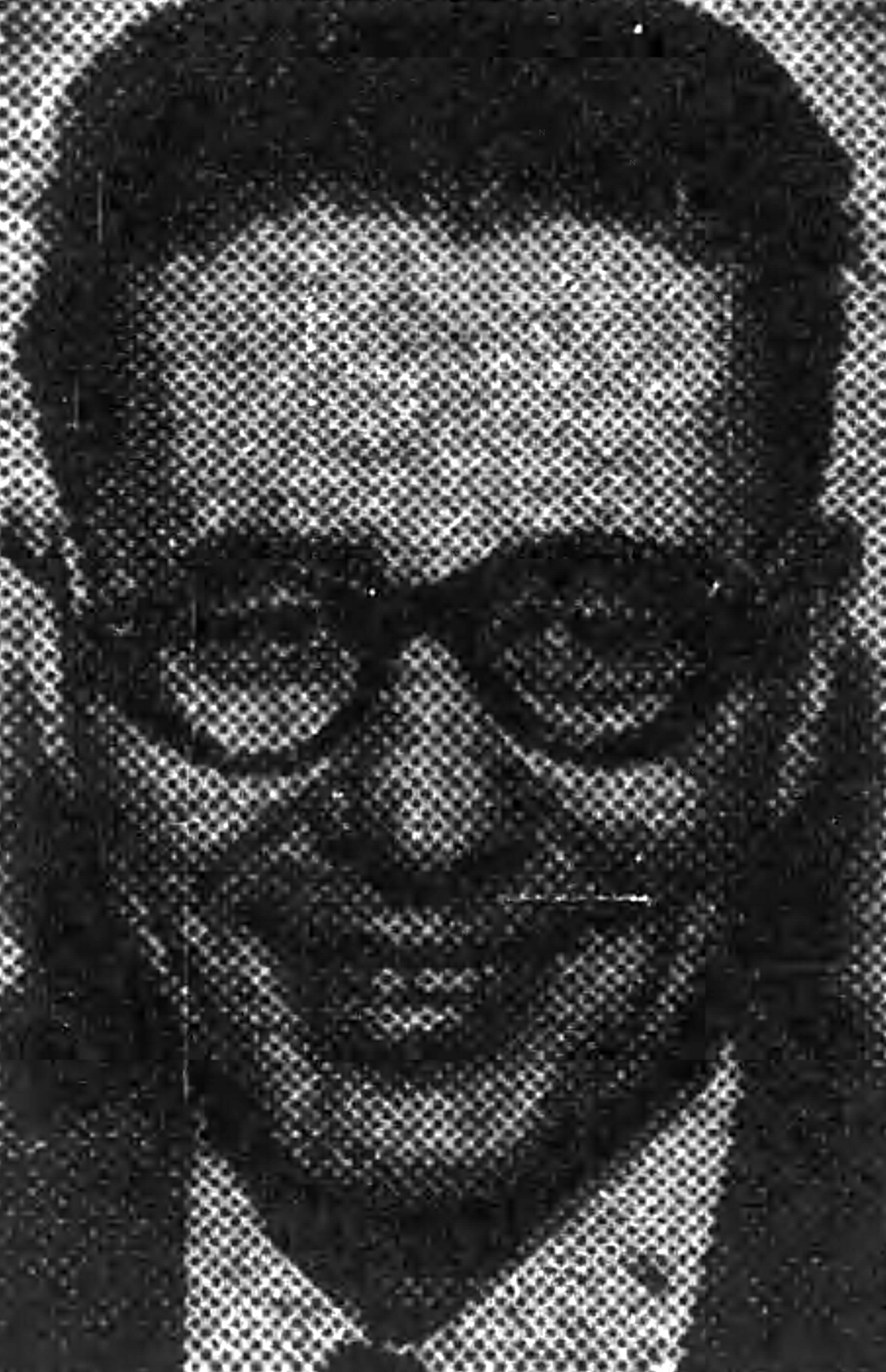
Clark c. 1954

Joseph Clark (June 18, 1913 – December 27, 1988) was an American Communist Party member and foreign editor at the Daily Worker.

== Biography ==
Clark was born as Joseph Cohen. He came from a middle-class family of Jewish immigrants. His daughter described his background as the "Old World of Yiddish stories and songs, Jewish intellectualism, revolutionary history and sacrifice." Clark attended City College of New York.

In 1929, Clark joined the Communist Party. Clark was active in the Young Communist League and built on this experience when he helped found the National Student League. Clark worked as the editor of the YCL's Weekly Review until the spring of 1942, when he joined the army and was replaced as editor by Claudia Jones. From 1950 to 1953, Clark worked as the Moscow correspondent for the Daily Worker. He then became the Daily Worker's foreign editor, writing a series of articles that attempted to counter the Russian reporting of the New York Times' Moscow correspondent Harrison Salisbury.

In 1955, the State Department denied Clark a passport to travel to the Geneva Summit. His passport was eventually returned following a court case

William Z. Foster criticized Clark, along with John Gates and Joseph Starobin, for forming a "Right tendency" within the Party. The three men began questioning what they saw as the "ultra-leftist" line of the Party under Foster's leadership. Following the 20th Congress of the Communist Party of the Soviet Union, Clark initially followed the approach of Walter Ulbricht, criticizing the cult around Stalin but still praising his persecution of Trotskyists. Clark resigned from the Communist Party in 1957. He wrote that his resignation was due to a "revulsion against the injustices of Stalinist communism" Although he broke with the Party, Clark defended it after he left from accusations of Soviet control and involvement in espionage. As one of the most prominent Communist Party leaders to resign publicly, Clark was criticized in the magazine Soviet Russia, and was accused of working with John Foster Dulles.

After his break with the Communist Party, Clark became a contributor to Dissent magazine, covering Communism. He came to the magazine through with his childhood friend Emanuel Geltman, who Clark had previously denounced as a fascist because of Geltman's Trotskyism.

Clark was married to Ruth Fine Clark and was the father of Weather Underground member Judith Clark. After the 1981 Brink's robbery, Clark refused to speak to his daughter and was not present at her trial. He died of a heart attack on December 27, 1988, at his home in South Egremont.
