= Carla Hughes =

American convicted murderer

- Born: Carla Ann Hughes; June 12, 1981 (age 45); Greenville, Mississippi, United States
- Occupation: Teacher
- Children: 1
- Parent(s): Carl and Lynda Hughes
- Status: Incarcerated
- Conviction: Two counts of capital murder
- Penalty: Life without parole

Carla Ann Hughes (born June 12, 1981) is an American former middle school teacher and murderer from Jackson, Mississippi, who was convicted of two counts of capital murder for the 2006 murders of her lover's pregnant fiancee, Avis Banks, and Banks's unborn child. She is serving two consecutive sentences of life without parole at the Central Mississippi Correctional Facility near Pearl, Mississippi.

== Early life and education ==
Carla Hughes was born on June 12, 1981, and was adopted by her uncle Carl and aunt Lynda Hughes when she was six weeks old. She was raised in Greenville, Mississippi. As a child, she excelled in horseback riding, beauty pageants and was an honors student.

She graduated from T.L. Weston High School in 1999. Hughes earned her bachelor's degree from the University of Southern Mississippi in the early 2000s. In 2004, she gave birth to a son. She next earned her Master of Education degree from Belhaven College in Jackson, Mississippi. Hughes then began taking graduate coursework in education at Delta State University. At the time of her arrest, she was pursuing a doctorate in education.

Hughes started out her teaching career at an elementary school but then took a job as a 7th grade language arts teacher at Chastain Middle School in Jackson, where she met fellow schoolteacher and basketball coach Keyon Pittman, a graduate of Alcorn State University. The two began having an intimate relationship. At the same time, Pittman had a live-in fiancee, Avis Banks, who was pregnant.

== Murder and Investigation ==
On the night of November 29, 2006, Avis Banks, a daycare worker, was found shot and stabbed to death in the garage of her Ridgeland, Mississippi home. Her body was discovered by her fiance Keyon Pittman, and it appeared as if the perpetrator had kicked in their back door. After discovering the body, Pittman called his co-worker Carla Hughes.

Hughes was later interrogated by police, where she initially denied her sexual relationship with Pittman and later denied having access to a gun. However, Hughes's cousin indicated to police, via an attorney, that he had lent a loaded .38 caliber, five-shot revolver to Hughes shortly before the murder, and that she had returned the gun empty. Hughes was originally charged with accessory to murder after the fact, but on December 8, 2006, the charges were upgraded to two counts of capital murder.

== Trial ==
Carla Hughes' trial began in October 2009. Prosecutors believed that Hughes killed Avis Banks so she could be with Pittman. Pittman testified for the prosecution on October 6, 2009, stating to jurors how he found Avis Banks' body in their garage, and talked about his relationship with Hughes. In addition to Pittman's testimony, prosecutors were able to prove that Hughes' cousin's gun was the murder weapon and that Hughes’ shoes were used to kick in the door. Cell phone records also showed that Hughes was near Banks’ and Pittman's home at the time of the murder.

Hughes' attorneys called Pittman a "bona fide womanizer" who did not want to be married with a child. They claimed that he had worn Hughes' shoes during the murder, and he discounted testimony about how Hughes' cellphone records placed her at the crime scene, claiming that she had a friend in the area.

On October 12, 2009, Hughes decided not to testify in her own defense. The case was then handed over to the jury.

== Verdict ==
On October 13, 2009, after eight hours of deliberation, Hughes's jury announced they had reached a verdict. Hughes was found guilty on both counts of capital murder. Although Hughes could have faced the death penalty, she was instead sentenced to serve two consecutive life sentences without parole.

== Aftermath ==
On August 30, 2010, a Madison County judge denied Carla Hughes' request for a new trial.

On June 21, 2012, the Mississippi Supreme Court affirmed the judgment of the Madison County Circuit Court. Six issues were raised on appeal, all of which were found to be without error.

== Media ==
The Carla Hughes case and the murder of Avis Banks have been explored and re-enacted on several true-crime television shows that include Criminals at Work, Dateline NBC, Snapped, Forensic Files, Stolen Voices, Buried Secrets, Scorned: Love Kills, Fatal Attraction, A Wedding and a Murder, American Monster: With Honors, Redrum (played by Melissa Joyner), and The Killer Truth (HBO). In 2021, the true crime podcast, Sistas Who Kill did an episode about Hughes.
