= Joseph Starobin =

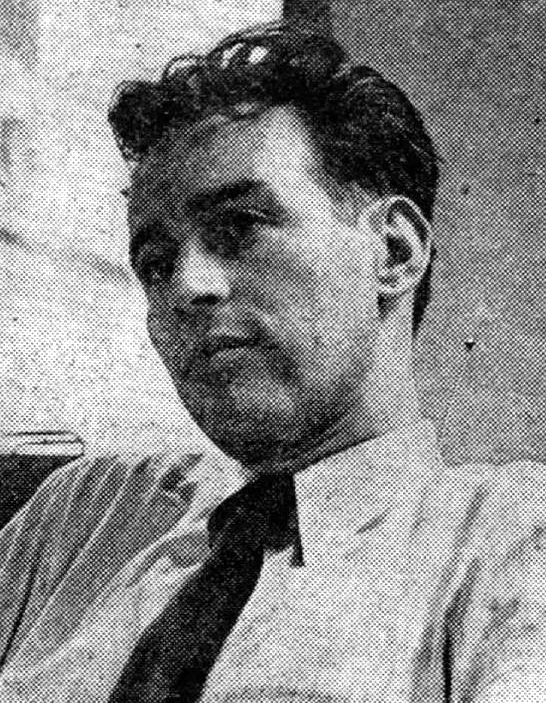
Starobin c. 1939

Joseph Robert Starobin (December 19, 1913 – November 6, 1976) was an American journalist and Communist Party member.

== Biography ==
Starobin attended City College of New York. He was politically active while at the college, serving as a vice president of the Social Problems Club and advocating for the removal of President Frederick B. Robinson.

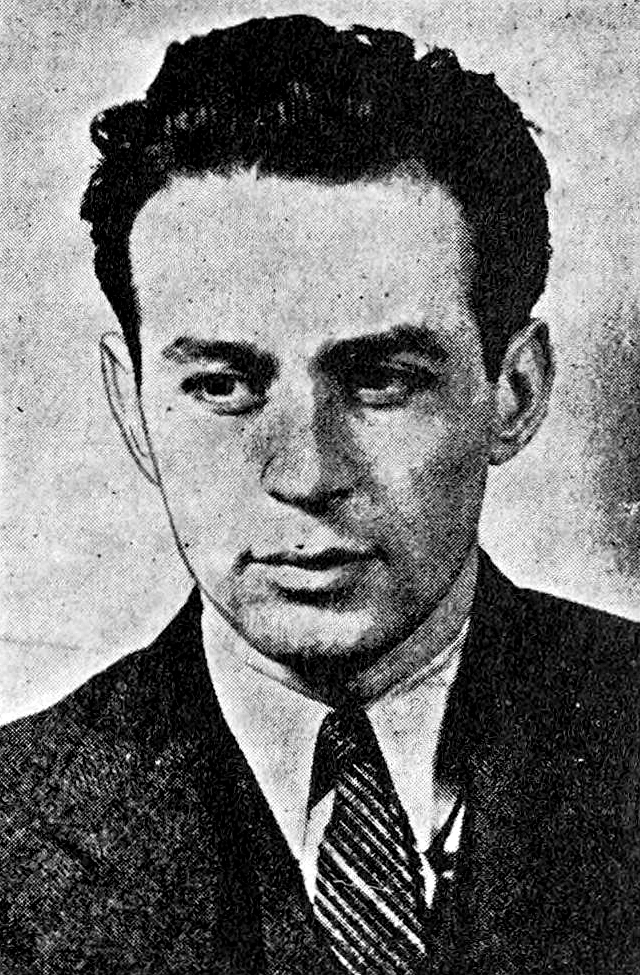
Starobin c. 1938

Starobin began his career as a chemist before becoming more involved in Communist activism. During the Moscow Trials, Starobin collaborated with James Wechsler on a pamphlet explaining the Party's position on the trials but it was never finished since the Party urged them to write an attack on Trotsky instead. Eventually, Starobin rose to become the foreign editor of the Daily Worker, before being replaced by Joseph Clark. In 1953, Starobin spent 30 days in China, as the first American journalist to travel past the so-called "bamboo curtain". He described this trip in his 1956 book Paris to Peking. His passport was revoked in August 1953 by the State Department.

That same year, Starobin began advocating for the Communist Party to distance itself from the Soviet Union. He eventually broke with the Communist Party, though the reasons for his departure were covered up by the Party because of his prominence as a writer and editor of Party publications. On August 24, 1956, Starobin published an editorial in The Nation, arguing that the Communist Party was no longer a viable party and arguing for a new socialist movement. Due to these views, he was criticized, along with John Gates, by William Z. Foster. Earlier in the 1950s, Foster had tried to expel Starobin and Gates from the Party because they disagreed with his assessment that a war between capitalist and Communist countries was inevitable. In December 1956, Starobin was one of eighty members of the Left invited by A.J. Muste to discuss the future of the contemporary socialist movement. These meetings eventually led to the creation of the American Forum for Socialist Education, which Starobin sponsored.

During the 1960s, Starobin became a senior fellow at the Russian Institute of Columbia University. Starobin and his wife moved from New York City in 1964 to Hancock, New York, where they lived in a converted 19th century barn that the couple operated as a skiing lodge.

Starobin continued to be politically active through the 1970s. He advocated for a negotiated peace settlement to the Vietnam War, sending a memorandum to J. William Fulbright about his discussions with North Vietnamese contacts. He met twice with Xuan Thuy, who he had first met during his 1953 visit to Hanoi. Starobin also met with Henry Kissinger, who was not responsive to Starobin's attempts at negotiation.

Starobin's son, Robert Starobin, became a historian of American slavery. Like his father, Robert Starobin was involved in left-wing politics and was a supporter of the Black Panthers. Joseph and Robert Starobin's papers are held together at Stanford University's Green Library.

== Bibliography ==
- Paris to Peking (1955)
- American Communism in Crisis, 1943-1957 (1975)
