= Stolen Voices, Buried Secrets =

American true crime TV series (2011–2012)

- Genre: True crime
- Country of origin: United States
- Original language: English
- No. of seasons: 3

Production
- Running time: 30 minutes (with commercials)

Original release
- Network: Investigation Discovery
- Release: January 10, 2011 – 2012

Stolen Voices, Buried Secrets is an American true crime television series on the Investigation Discovery Network. The program is different from other true-crime series because the murders are portrayed from the omniscient point-of-view of the victim using "fictionalized dialogue". While the all-seeing narrator knows who was responsible, the series allows viewers to piece together who is the culprit based on clues from investigators, family and friends as each story unfolds. Stolen Voices, Buried Secrets has been compared to the 2009 film The Lovely Bones in which a 13-year-old girl is murdered and views from heaven as her family copes with the tragedy. The program is known as I Was Murdered in the United Kingdom, and at the beginning of the third season, which began airing in 2013, the show adopted that title.

The series ran for three seasons, ending in September 2012.

== Episode Guide ==
=== Season 1 ===
1. "Daddy's Princess" - Ali Kemp, a lifeguard from Leawood, Kansas, was found strangled to death in a poolhouse pump room in June 2002. After years of investigating the crime, a billboard gives police a tip pointing to a killer across the country in Connecticut.
2. "Checkmate" - Ellen Robb was a wife and mother who was beaten to death in her Wayne, Pennsylvania home in December 2006. Her murder appears to be a robbery gone wrong, but evidence leads police to suspect her economics professor husband, Rafael Robb.
3. "Cold As Ice" - Denise Huber disappeared after a Morrissey concert in Inglewood, California in June 1991. The case of her disappearance went cold for three years, until a discovery in a Ryder truck in Prescott, Arizona leads police to her killer.
4. "Closing Time" - Jerry Monroe was found shot to death in his Louisville, Kentucky bar in June 2002. Police initially suspect he was killed in a random robbery, but his family suspects that his murder was the work of his wife Vicki and her adult son Leslie.
5. "La Muerta" - Sophia Martinez was a young high-school student who was killed in March 2000 after withdrawing money from an ATM. Her body was later found in the El Paso, Texas desert. A surveillance camera and a confession to a friend's girlfriend seal the fate of William Berkley.
6. "A Mother's Love" - Debi Whitlock was a young mother who was killed at her Modesto, California home in March 1988. Her mother leads the crusade to find her killer. Nine years after the murder, a drug informant comes forward to police with information on who killed Debi.
7. "In the Name of Love" - Avis Banks was a daycare worker from Ridgeland, Mississippi and a mother-to-be. In November 2006, she was found slain in her garage. Her fiancé is initially the prime suspect, but his mistress and co-worker Carla Hughes turns out to be the real perpetrator.
8. "Bad Karma" - Michael Dojaquez was a yoga instructor and married father of three. When he is shot to death on his porch in September 2003, the town of Tucson, Arizona is shocked. In their investigation, police discover that a secret mistress, Amber Trudell, is his killer.
9. "Mortal Sin" - Ashley Wilson was a pregnant 19-year-old from Richmond, Texas who was found hanged in her apartment in January 2004. Police rule her death as a suicide, but her mother is doubtful. The truth to her death is revealed after her ex-boyfriend watches "Passion of the Christ".
10. "Killer Instinct" - Crystal Faye Todd hailed from Conway, South Carolina. In November 1991, her dead body is found in the woods. There are a number of suspects in her rape and murder, but DNA evidence leads police to her true killer, whose identity shocks the community.
11. "Sudden Death" - John Cataneo was a plumber and father of one living in Holly Hill, Florida in June 2004. That was when he was gunned down outside his duplex. An investigation uncovers a deadly conspiracy involving his wife and their neighbor.
12. "Til Death Do Us Part" - Dawn Hacheney was a young minister's wife in East Bremerton, Washington when her house caught fire in December 1997. When a confidant comes forward years later however, it reveals that Dawn's death was no accident and that she was actually suffocated by her husband.

=== Season 2 ===
1. "Night Angel" - Rosie Larner was an 18-year-old from Lansing, Michigan. One night in December 1993, she goes out partying with her friends and is never seen alive again. Years pass until her childhood friend and an ex-boyfriend are arrested for the crime.
2. "Lethal Liaison" - Tori Vienneau was a single mother who was murdered in her San Diego, California apartment in July 2006. Her 10-month-old son was also killed. Internet searches reveal the identity of Tori's killer, who proves to have been closely acquainted with the victims.
3. "The Mask" - Lisa Fein was abducted from her home in Galien Township, Michigan and murdered in June 2000. Her body was discovered in a shallow grave nearby. DNA evidence under Lisa's fingernails is able to tie her murder to Frank Spagnola, the father of her child.
4. "(In)Security" - Bryan Ruff was a young father and security guard from Salt Lake City, Utah. In December 1991, he mysteriously goes missing and his body is later found. 15 years later, there is a break in the case which leads police to discover who killed Bryan.
5. "Missing Mother's Day" - Tina Marie Hill was a 39-year-old divorced mother from Social Circle, Georgia who suddenly disappeared while walking to a convenience store in May 2005. After days of searching, her body is found, and after a year of investigation, so is her killer.
6. "Hunting Season" - Lynn Orrand was a devoted husband who was shot to death while hunting in Murfreesboro, Tennessee in January 1982. The case goes cold until 25 years later, when his widow is charged for hiring her then-boyfriend to have her husband murdered.
7. "A Walk in the Park" - Jeanette Kirby was stabbed to death in a Delhi Township, Michigan park in June 1986 while jogging. Her body was found naked and her hands were bound with plastic flexible handcuffs. 16 years after her murder, a cold-blooded killer is brought to justice.
8. "Written in Blood" - Nancy Bishop was a young Chicago, Illinois mother expecting her first child with husband Richard Langert. In April 1990, Nancy and Richard are gunned down in their home, and police are shocked at who the murderer turns out to be.
9. "Recipe for Murder" - Lucille Gallegos was a housekeeper from Wichita, Kansas who was brutally murdered in June 2002. She was decapitated and the assailant attempted to set fire to the crime scene. A DNA sample ties the crime to her neighbor, who was also tied to other sexual assaults.
10. "Into the Wild" - Steven Wood was an intermediate school science teacher from Yucaipa, California who disappeared in June 1993 after a school board meeting. Two days after, his truck is found, and four months later, so are his remains. Police suspect that the murder is linked to a Satanic cult.
11. "Twisted Love" - Laura Salmon was a 17-year-old who was described as the girl next door. She was attending Middle Tennessee State University in Murfreesboro, Tennessee in May 1984 when her body was found near a quarry. It takes police almost 17 years to tie the crime to her ex-boyfriend.
12. "Fatal Crossroads" - Ron Whitehead had been a Boeing employee for 42 years until he was gunned down on his way to work in Seattle, Washington in March 2005. Although the killed appeared to be a carjacking, police discover that Ron's murder was orchestrated by his wife Velma.
13. "Man Down" - Robert Lustig was a volunteer firefighter and police officer from Deming, New Mexico. His mother is suspicious when he mysteriously disappears in August 2004, and when his body is found in a junkyard refrigerator eight months later, police investigate his ex-roommate.
14. "River of Death" - Lisa Allison was a college student in Las Vegas, Nevada, who returned to her hometown of Liberty, Texas in April 1996. One afternoon, she goes to a local car wash and mysteriously goes missing. After her body is recovered in the Trinity River, police search for her killer.
15. "With A Friend Like This" - Cathy Tameny was a young single mother living in Anaheim, California. In August 1985, she was found strangled to death in her apartment, and her young son was bound with electrical tape. Over two decades after the murder, a killer would finally get justice.
16. "Hook, Line, And Sinker" - Teresa Comfort was a 20-year-old carefree young woman in Lakeland, Florida, until one day in May 1994, when she is stabbed to death. The next day, her body is found in her partially submerged vehicle. After investigating the crime, police link the murder to John Jurbala.
17. "Deadly Harvest" - Timothy Hack and Kelly Drew were high school sweethearts in Sullivan, Wisconsin. After the couple disappear from a wedding in August 1980, friends initially suspect the couple eloped, until their bodies are found, shot to death. A killer is convicted twenty-nine years later.
18. "Caught On Tape" - Tosha Lampkin was a Houston, Texas mother and daycare owner. While visiting her family in Shreveport, Louisiana in April 2005, she is kidnapped, raped, and burned alive. Brandon Davis and Dwight Bacon were later convicted of committing the crime.
19. "One Last Ride" - Randy Soderberg was a 22-year-old husband and father in Mount Vernon, Washington. In order to get extra money, he decides to sell his Mustang in July 1984, but he never returns from making the sale. Police later find his body, and the crime takes two decades to solve.
20. "Silent Vow" - Tina Morton Clegg was an employee of a nonprofit organization in Portland, Oregon. One day in July 1993, she is gunned down at her job in what appeared to be a robbery gone wrong. However, police soon uncover that Tina's murder was the result of her husband's plot.
21. "New Year's Eve Murder" - Kim Dunkin was a young mother living in Aloha, Oregon. On New Years 1993, her body is found in her Chevrolet Camaro after a party in Northeast Portland. After years, her family thought the case would remain unsolved until an unlikely suspect is arrested.
22. "Blind Faith" - Tryon Eichelberger had been a pastor in Columbia, South Carolina for several decades until one day in May 2009, when he was beaten during a home invasion. Two months later, while in a coma, he died. In 2010, the men responsible for his brutal beating death were charged.
23. "Out of the Ashes" - Lula Young was a 47-year-old woman from DeSoto County, Mississippi who was battling cancer. However, her death came in December 1994 as a result of a house fire. An investigation would reveal that Lula was actually murdered by her friend for life insurance money.
24. "Night Shift Nightmare" - Rochelle Anderson was a 25-year-old woman from Tomahawk, Wisconsin working at a convenience store. While working one night in March 2008, the young mother is murdered. An 18-year-old resident is later convicted of robbery and murder in the case.
25. "Morning Ambush" - Robert Taylor was a 33-year-old man from Lakeland, Florida who was gunned down one day in April 1996 while on his way to work. Two years later, Robert's girlfriend comes forward to police and reveals that he was murdered by his friend after a romantic rivalry turned deadly.
26. "Only the Good Die Young" - Kate Johnson was a student at the University of Portland who was found sexually assaulted and strangled in her dormitory in May 2001. Years later, DNA evidence links a former college student and acquaintance to Kate's murder, and he is sentenced to life.

=== Season 3 ===
1. "A Perfect Storm" - Lisa Bado was a 20-year-old culinary student who had just moved to Lantana, Florida with her mother Rita. In August 1992, during the midst of Hurricane Andrew, both women are murdered. Cigarette butts found at the crime scene eventually lead to an arrest.
2. "Newlywed Nightmare" - Jamaica Howard and Paul Chase were young newlyweds living in Tacoma, Washington. One night in December 2002, the couple is found shot to death in their car. A decade later, their murders are solved when police officers investigating another murder arrest Antwone Goolsby.
3. "My Bloody Valentine" - Diana Peterson was a 16-year-old girl from Shoreline, Washington who was found murdered in her backyard in February 1975. Two neighborhood boys become the prime suspects in her death, but her murder goes cold for more than three decades until a killer is brought to justice.
4. "Just My Type" - John Arana was a gay Sacramento, California man and a practicing Buddhist. He was found stabbed to death in his home in November 1992, and his vehicle was stolen. More than sixteen years later, DNA ties the murder to a career criminal from Missouri.
5. "Silent Night, Deadly Night" - Bob and Idella Young were known for being a charitable couple in the town of Nampa, Idaho. One day in December 2003, they were found brutally murdered inside their home, leaving their community in shock. Five years later, the Youngs' killer is identified.
6. "Final Delivery" - Bob Lexa was an aspiring actor and a pizza delivery man living in West Palm Beach, Florida. While working one day in June 1997, he was shot to death in his car. Police initially believe the crime was a botched robbery, but it turned out to be a case of mistaken identity.
7. "Devil You Know" - Mandy Carlson-Bey was a young, expectant mother who was found slain in her St. Paul, Minnesota apartment in October 1998, along with her 2-year-old son Jereau. Carlson-Bey was HIV-positive at the time of her death. The heinous crime was traced back to a former lover.
8. "Backcountry Blood" - Ned Blackwood and his wife Celene were living in the rural, wooded community of Ovando, Montana when they were found hogtied and killed in their home in July 1988. One month later, their killer, Terry Allen Langford, is apprehended across the country in North Carolina, and is sentenced to death. Langford was executed for the crime in Montana via lethal injection in 1998.
9. "Written in Blood" - Lisa Lightfoot was a 19-year-old Indianapolis, Indiana woman in the early stages of pregnancy. In September 1985, her dead body is found on an embankment; she was stabbed and beaten to death. Two decades later, DNA evidence brings her killer to justice.
10. "If I Can't Have You" - Allan Neuman was a 48-year-old Scottsdale, Arizona man who was dating 32-year-old Julie Sweeney. When the pair was found shot dead in November 1998, police initially suspected a murder-suicide, until evidence points to Julie's estranged husband.
11. "Lone Star, Double Murder" - Shawna Ferris and her friend Robyn Richter were found dead in Robyn's SUV in June 2008. The key to solving the murders of the two Granbury, Texas women is the restaurant which they ate at the night before their deaths, and latent fingerprints found inside the vehicle.
12. "Midnight Monster" - Kathy Taft was a member of the North Carolina State Board of Education and a mother of four. One night in March 2010, she was attacked at her friend's Greenville, North Carolina home, and she died of her injuries. In 2012, her killer is sentenced to life in prison.
