= Joy Powell =

American Pentecostal pastor and community activist

- Born: Joyce Powell; March 5, 1962 (age 64)
- Known for: Community activism
- Criminal charges: Murder, 2nd degree; burglary, 1st degree

Joy Powell (born March 5, 1962) is a former community activist and Pentecostal pastor from Rochester, New York, whose career consisted of fighting against gang violence and police misconduct.

After allegedly being raped by a correctional officer in 1995 and having the authorities refuse to investigate her complaint she began coordinating local protests and calls for police accountability which she routinely organized until her arrest in 2006.

During her career Powell ran local charitable events in the area and operated a youth homeless shelter out of a salon she owned. She also started organizing candlelight vigils for victims of neighborhood violence after her son was killed as a bystander in a gang shooting in 2000. After the shooting of a mentally ill man, Powell's activism led both to the creation of an "Emergency Response Team" to deal with mental health situations and additional training for Rochester Police Department officers to handle the mentally ill.

In 2006, Powell was arrested and charged with felony assault and burglary after a pawn shop broker gave police a description matching Powell as one of the people who sold him stolen property. Powell maintains the charges were not only false, but also politically motivated due to her attempt to have criminal charges filed with the Attorney General of New York against several deputies of the Rochester Police Department. Powell alleged the deputies assaulted and threatened her after she tried to file a complaint with internal affairs that a member of her congregation was the victim of racially motivated harassment by the police.

Several members of Powell's congregations testified at trial that Powell was leading a Bible study class at her church at the time of the pawn shop's burglary and assault.

Powell was found guilty by an all-white jury in 2006 and sentenced to 16 years in prison.

In 2009, while serving her sentence for assault and burglary, Powell was arrested for the June 6, 1992, shooting death of James Rutledge after a jailhouse informant claimed to witness the decades-old homicide and identified Powell as being involved. In 2011, Powell was convicted of second-degree murder based on the informant's testimony and received a sentence of 25 years to life. Powell was set to serve the sentence to upon the completion of her 16-year sentence for assault and burglary. Powell is currently being held at The Bedford Hills Correctional Facility for Women and will be eligible for parole in the year 2045 when she is 84 years old.

Many social activists and black power groups believe Powell's case is a clear example of injustice.
