= Elaine Roulet =

American Roman Catholic nun and prison reform activist

- Born: October 5, 1930; Maspeth, Queens, New York City, New York, U.S.
- Died: August 13, 2020 (aged 89); Rockaway Park, Queens, New York City

Sister Elaine Margaret Roulet (October 5, 1930 – August 13, 2020) was a Roman Catholic sister of the Sisters of St. Joseph who created programs that connect incarcerated mothers and their children. She was instrumental in the prison reform movement and established the precedent of connecting imprisoned mothers with their babies that many United States prisons now use as a model.

== Early life ==
Elaine Margaret Roulet was born to George and Margaret (Laundrigan) Roulet in Maspeth, Queens, New York City. She was the couple's second child. Her mother worked in the Brooklyn Navy Yard following her father's death.

In 1949, Roulet professed her first vows as a Sister of St. Joseph in Brentwood, Long Island. She made her final vows in 1952. For the first two decades of her religious life, she worked at parochial schools in Brooklyn and Queens as a teacher and later principal.

Roulet earned a master's degree in counseling from Bank Street College of Education in Manhattan.

== Prison work ==
Roulet started her work initially wanting to teach the women inmates of a maximum-security prison in New York how to read. After being inspired to help them with what they really wanted, which was to know where their children were, she created a position that she called prison family liaison and served in that role for 10 years working with the prison and Catholic Charities. She founded Providence House Inc., an organization affiliated with Catholic Charities which manages sites that offer shelter and assistance to battered women and families, homeless women, and temporary housing for women recently released from prison.

In 2005, Roulet founded a monthly retreat for formerly incarcerated women called Our Journey.

=== Children's Center at Bedford Hills ===
In 1970, Roulet began working at Bedford Hills Correction Center as a family liaison. She developed a reputation as a nonjudgmental listener for whom "children magically behaved".

She later became director of the Children's Center at Bedford Hills, a unique program that permitted mothers whose babies were born in prison to keep them for up to one year. The Children's Center provides a parenting center, a children's playroom, and a nursery and infant center to children of inmates. When the center first opened Sister Roulet was sought out by other men's and women's prisons for information on how to create similar programs and soon became a national model for prisons in terms of providing support for mothers and their babies in prison. A prison nursery was opened and operated in the Taconic Correctional Facility for women, across the street from the Bedford Hills Correctional Facility. Until 2011, Taconic also had a prison nursery; it was closed because of budget cuts and a low number of mothers and babies that was as high as twenty-six mothers and their babies for many years.

== Personal life ==
Roulet lived in Brentwood, New York and Breezy Point, Queens. She became friends with actress Glenn Close.

Later in life, Roulet developed dementia and moved to Stella Maris Convent in Rockaway Park, Queens. Roulet died of heart failure on August 13, 2020, at the convent.

== Recognition ==
In 1993, Sister Elaine Roulet was inducted in the National Women's Hall of Fame.

The 2011 documentary, The Mothers of Bedford featured her workt.
