= Carolyn Warmus =

American convicted murderer (born 1964)

- Born: January 8, 1964 (age 62); Troy, Michigan, U.S.
- Education: BA psychology Master Degree in Elementary Education
- Alma mater: University of Michigan; Teachers College, Columbia University, New York, New York, U.S.
- Occupation: Former elementary school teacher
- Parent: Thomas Warmus
- Status: Paroled
- Motive: Jealousy
- Convictions: Second degree murder: May 1992; Illegal-possession of a firearm: May 1992
- Criminal charges: Second degree murder, illegal possession of a firearm
- Penalty: Murder: 25 years to life in prison; Firearm: 5 to 15 years (concurrently)

Details
- Victims: Betty Jeanne Solomon
- Date: January 15, 1989
- Country: United States
- State: New York
- Location: Greenburgh
- Weapon: .25 caliber Beretta pistol w/silencer
- Imprisoned at: Bedford Hills Correctional Facility for Women; Received: June 29, 1992; Paroled: June 17, 2019
- Website: carolynwarmus.org

Carolyn Warmus (born January 8, 1964) is an American former elementary schoolteacher who was convicted in 1989 of killing Betty Jeanne Solomon. Solomon was the wife of Warmus’s lover Paul Solomon. After a hung jury at her first trial in 1991, Warmus was convicted of second degree murder and illegal possession of a firearm at her second trial in 1992.

Warmus has consistently maintained her innocence. She was incarcerated at the Bedford Hills Correctional Facility for Women, Westchester County, New York. She received multiple disciplinary warnings, which contributed to her first parole denial in early 2017.

She served 27 years for the murder and was released from prison on parole on June 17, 2019.

The murder case attracted national media attention and led to comparisons with the 1987 film Fatal Attraction, about a love affair that turns deadly. The Warmus case went on to inspire made-for-TV movies, six different episodes across multiple television broadcasters and at least one book.

== Early life ==
Carolyn Warmus was born in 1964 in Troy, Michigan, and grew up in Birmingham, an affluent suburb of Detroit. Her father, Thomas A. Warmus, was a self-made multi-millionaire who accumulated his fortune in the insurance business, founding the American Way Life Insurance Company of Southfield. In 1989, Thomas's assets were estimated at $150 million; he owned eight jets, two yachts, estates in Michigan, Florida, Arizona, and New York, and fifteen cars.

In 1970, Thomas's wife, Elizabeth, filed for divorce, and, after two years, won custody of Warmus and her two younger siblings. The divorce decree was handed down when Warmus was aged 8.

Warmus earned good grades, played basketball and graduated from Seaholm High School in Birmingham. In 1981, she enrolled at the University of Michigan. After graduating with a degree in psychology, she moved to New York City and earned a master's degree in elementary education from Teachers College, Columbia University. In September 1987, Warmus landed a job at Greenville Elementary School in Scarsdale, New York. There, she met soon-to-be lover, Paul Solomon, a fifth-grade teacher, along with his family: wife, Betty Jeanne, and daughter, Kristan.

== Crime and investigation ==
Early in the evening of January 15, 1989, a New York Telephone operator received a call from a woman in distress. When the call was abruptly disconnected, she alerted police, but they found nothing because the reverse directory had an incorrect address. At 11:42 p.m., the body of Betty Jeanne was found in the family's Greenburgh condominium by Solomon. She had been pistol-whipped in the head and shot nine times in her back and legs.

The investigation initially focused on Solomon, whose alibi was that he had stopped briefly at a local bowling alley to see friends and then spent the evening with Warmus in Yonkers at the Holiday Inn's Treetops Lounge. Once Warmus and Solomon left the lounge, they went to her car and had sexual relations. When Warmus and additional witnesses confirmed his alibis, detectives turned their attention elsewhere.

When investigators gained information that Warmus had obtained a .25 caliber Beretta pistol with a silencer shortly before the murder, Detective Richard Constantino checked calls made from her home phone on January 15. He discovered one made at 3:02 p.m. to Ray's Sport Shop in North Plainfield, New Jersey. Store records indicated the only female to purchase .25-caliber ammunition that day was Liisa Kattai from Long Island. When questioned, Kattai denied ever being in the shop or buying ammunition. Further investigation determined that Kattai's driver's license had been lost or stolen while she was employed at a summer job, where one of her co-workers was Warmus. Police now had enough evidence to make an arrest.

== Trials and convictions ==
On February 2, 1990, Warmus was indicted on the charges of second-degree murder and second-degree criminal possession of a weapon. Her first trial began January 14, 1991, at the Westchester County Courthouse, with David Lewis as her attorney.

Solomon testified at the first trial, and received immunity from prosecution in return for his testimony. He said he met Warmus in the fall of 1987 at an elementary school in Greenburgh, and that they soon became sexually involved. The following spring, Solomon wanted to end the unfaithful relationship: "I said, 'Carolyn, you know we're not going to be able to see each other in the summer’.” He went on to testify, "She was upset. She cried. She said, 'Life's not worth living without you.' I said, 'Carolyn, don't be overdramatic.'" During the first trial, the defense asserted that Solomon and the gun seller (a private investigator) tied heavily to the case should have been tried for the murder instead of Warmus.

The trial lasted nearly three months. After twelve days of deliberations, the jury came back deadlocked at 8–4 in favor of conviction, but unable to arrive at the required unanimous verdict. The judge declared a mistrial on April 27, 1991.

In January 1992, a second trial began in which prosecutors presented new evidence: a bloody cashmere glove allegedly belonging to Warmus that was photographed and recovered from the crime scene. Warmus's attorney questioned why the glove, which was found by Solomon in a closet between the first and second trial, was allowed as evidence, and argued that the prosecution failed to provide definitive proof that the glove belonged to Warmus or that it was the same glove as the one pictured in the crime scene photographs. The judge allowed the glove to stand as evidence in the case. The defense continued to press its argument that Solomon was trying to frame Warmus for the murder. The jury deliberated for six days before returning a guilty verdict for second-degree murder and second-degree criminal possession of weapon on May 27, 1992.

On June 26, 1992, Judge John Carey, who presided over both of Warmus' trials, imposed a maximum term of 25 years to life in prison for the murder, and the maximum sentence of five to 15 years in prison on the weapon count to be served concurrently. Judge Carey stated that Warmus committed "a hideous act, a most extreme, illegal and wanton murder". For the first time in both of her trials, a weeping Warmus spoke in the courtroom:

"I can only ask for leniency because I'm innocent. If I'm guilty of anything at all it was simply being foolish enough to believe the lies and promises that Paul Solomon made to me."

— Carolyn Warmus, at sentencing trial (June 1992)

Judge Carey later said, "No community which hopes to be bound by the rule of law, can tolerate any such merciless slaughter."

== Incarceration ==
Warmus was incarcerated at the Bedford Hills Correctional Facility for Women. Under inmate ID#: 92G0987, Warmus's incarceration disciplinary history document was released in January 2017. The document reports eleven Tier III and four Tier II misconducts, with a total of eleven misconducts being ruled as affirmed. Warmus had her first parole hearing on January 9, 2017, represented in the state appellate court by attorney Mayer Morganroth. She was denied parole in January 2017 and again in July 2018, but was granted parole on June 17, 2019.

In 2004, Warmus filed a federal lawsuit against the New York State Department of Correctional Services, claiming to have been sexually abused by prison guards. Warmus stated that she had been raped and forced to trade sexual favors for basic privileges. One corrections officer, Lt. Glenn Looney, was arraigned in the town of Bedford court on April 15, 2004, on a charge of second-degree sexual abuse, a misdemeanor. Warmus backed her claim by providing prison officials with a sample of Looney's semen that she had kept refrigerated in plastic. In 2008, Warmus received $10,000 from the Department of Correctional Services in settlement of the lawsuit.

She served 27 years for the murder and was released from prison on parole on June 17, 2019. Under New York Law section 259-H, unless her conviction is overturned, she will be subject to parole for the rest of her life, which includes post release supervision.

== Additional developments ==
On the day of Warmus's sentencing, her attorney, William I. Aronwald, announced a reward of $250,000 from her family for any information leading to the arrest of the person(s) responsible for Betty Jeanne's murder. Betty Jeanne's sister, Joyce Green, denounced the reward offer as "bogus" and said the evidence against Warmus was strong. Green said she would have favored a sentence of life without the possibility of parole.

Following Warmus's first trial, the Scarsdale school board faced public pressure to remove Solomon as a teacher, as he had testified in court to having multiple extramarital affairs, including his fling with Warmus. In September 1991, Solomon was removed from classroom duties and was assigned non-teaching duties. His removal was an amicable decision in coordination with Solomon, the school board and the principal of Greenville Elementary.

Warmus entered court on November 17, 2016, to argue about legal fees with her former appeals lawyer, Julia Heit, whom she is suing for malpractice. Warmus claims Heit falsely managed her appeal, in part, by not testing DNA, and is seeking a return of $80,000 in fees and hand over an additional $320,000 in total compensation. According to her then attorney, Mayer Morganroth, Warmus was hoping to get out of prison so she could have surgery for a brain tumor.

== In popular culture ==
=== Movies ===
ABC aired the docudrama A Murderous Affair: The Carolyn Warmus Story, on 13 September 1992. Solomon allowed his name to be used and cooperated with the production company. One month later, CBS aired their own competing docudrama, The Danger of Love: The Carolyn Warmus Story, on October 4, 1992. While based partly on Solomon's version of events, he refused to have his name used in the CBS film.

=== Television shows ===
The Cable News Network produced a CNN Special Report, episode "Fatal Attraction or Fatal Mistake?: The Carolyn Warmus Story", aired 4 August 2017. The report detailed Warmus's belief that DNA on the cashmere glove evidence presented at the second trial could exonerate her if the court were to allow its retesting. Paul Solomon declined to be interviewed by CNN for this special report.

Investigation Discovery network aired multiple depictions of the Warmus case on the following documentary drama programs:

- Series Scorned: Love Kills episode Teacher, Teacher, season 5; episode 10, aired: 16 May 2015. Betty Jeanne and Paul Solomon relish in a joyful life together in a New York suburb. But when Paul starts an affair with his younger colleague Carolyn, their marriage downgrades and points to his wife's cold-blooded murder.
- Series Deadly Women episode Hearts of Darkness, season 3; episode 6, aired: 24 September 2009, the Warmus case is the second (minute 16) of the three re-enactments. These women ignite their jealousy with madness, their angers are so remorseless they kill to satisfy their jealousy.
- Series Cold Blood, episode Femme Fatale, season 1; episode 4, aired: 12 November 2008. The episode depicts the Warmus homicide investigation in a first-person perspective. The episode highlights the diligent detective work and forensics to show the truth of this murder.

The Oxygen Network crime documentary series that focuses on female criminals Snapped released the episode Carolyn Warmus, season 1; episode 13, aired: 22 October 2004. The episode delves into the evidence gathering against Warmus, focused on how she acquired the firearm and ammunition leading to Betty Jeanne's murder.

On March 26 and 27, 2022, Oxygen aired The Fatal Attraction Murder, which is also devoted to Carolyn Warmus's crime.

The short-lived (1993–1995) ABC television news magazine series Day One aired Warmus's first public interview, premiered August 2, 1993. Warmus was interviewed by broadcast journalist Forrest Sawyer at the Bedford Hills Correctional Facility.
