= Bedford Hills Correctional Facility for Women =

Women's prison in Bedford, New York

Coordinates: 41°14′19″N 73°40′51″W

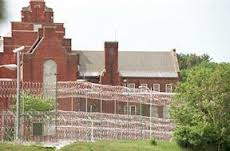
- Interactive map of Bedford Hills Correctional Facility for Women
- Location: 247 Harris Road Bedford Hills, New York
- Status: Operational
- Security class: Maximum
- Capacity: 921
- Population: 556 (July 1, 2021)
- Opened: 1901
- Managed by: NYS DOCCS

Bedford Hills Correctional Facility for Women, a women's prison in the town of Bedford, New York, is the only maximum security New York State women's prison. The prison previously opened under the name Westfield State Farm in 1901. It lies just outside the hamlet and census-designated place Bedford Hills, New York.

== Facility ==
Bedford Hills Correctional Facility (formerly Bedford Hills Correctional Institution) is one of three New York facilities exclusively for women, the others being Albion Correctional Facility, and Taconic Correctional Facility. Taconic, a medium/minimum-security prison, lies directly across the street from Bedford Hills, while Albion is located in western New York between Rochester and Buffalo.

The site has been known as the New York State Reformatory for Women at Bedford Hills, and later as Westfield State Farm. Under the name Westfield State Farm, it housed 487 women in 1930, and 645 in 1940.

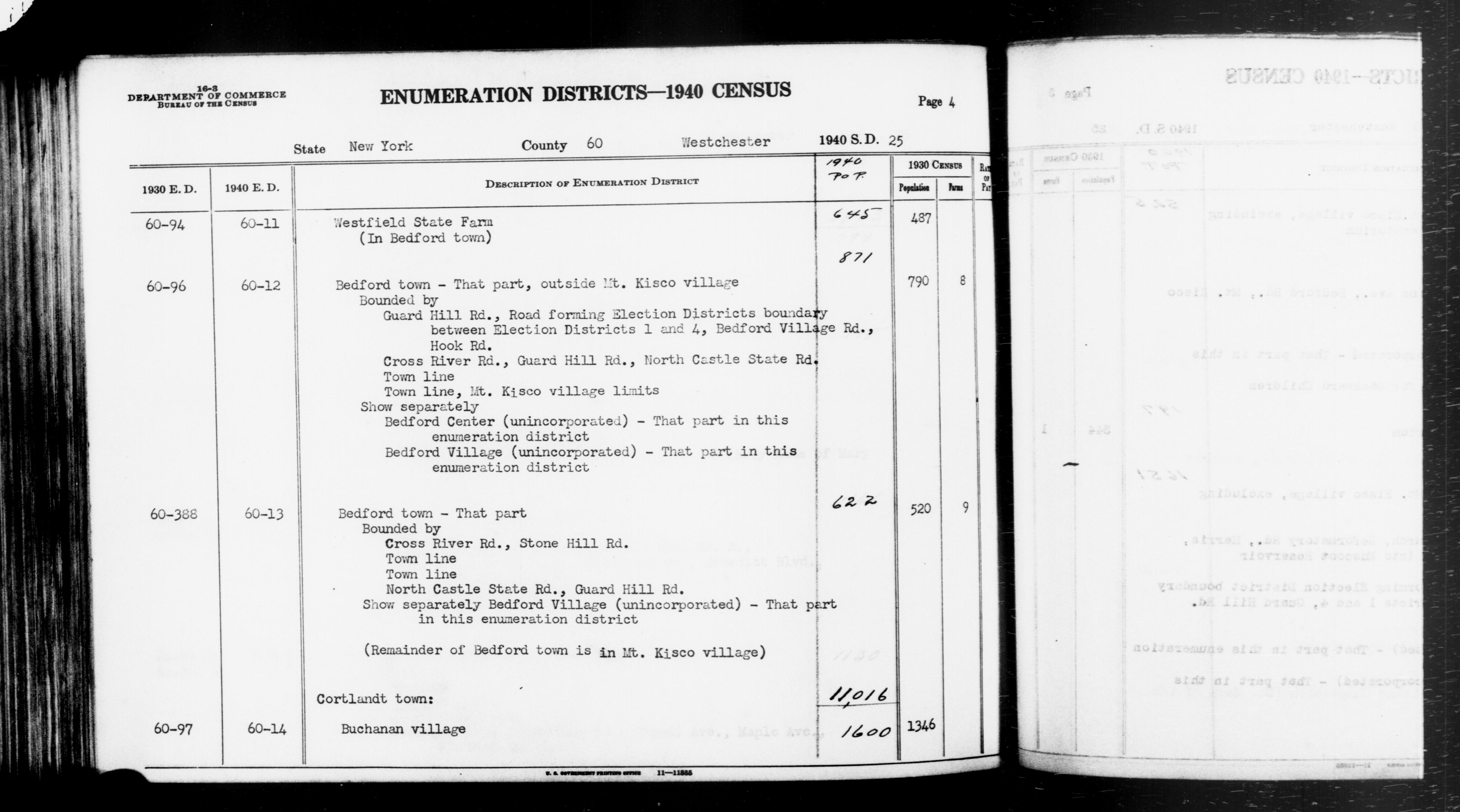
Census Enumeration of Westfield State Farm (1940)

A prison nursery was first established upon the opening of the prison, in 1901. The current incarnation, Bedford Hills' family-centered program, was founded by Sister Elaine Roulet. It has served as a model for other prison programs in the United States and is considered the standard for innovative family-centered programs. Mothers incarcerated there are separate from the general population, in the Infant Development Center located on a single floor of one of the buildings. Those who wish to participate in the program must not have had any involvement with child welfare authorities in the past, nor can anyone who has been convicted of a violent crime. Children are allowed to stay in the nursery until 12 months (one year), although this can be extended up to 18 months (1 1/2 years) so the mother can be released with her child. As of 2015 it is the longest operating prison nursery in the U.S.

In the post–Furman v. Georgia period, from the time New York reinstated the death penalty in 1995 until its repeal in 2007, Bedford Hills prison was designated as having the state death row for women. However, New York State did not execute anyone during that time, nor since 1963.

== Political unrest and due process ==
In 1974, in what came to be called the August Rebellion, the prisoners briefly took over parts of the prison in reaction to guards' assault on Carol Crooks, an incarcerated woman organizing for prisoners' rights. About 200 of the 450-plus incarcerated women rebelled in protest of the inhumane treatment of Crooks at Bedford Hills.

The prisoners won a subsequent civil-action lawsuit, initiated by Elizabeth Powell, that led to greater protections of Fourth Amendment (due process) rights for incarcerated people, in Powell v. Ward (1976).

Following the 1974 rebellion, the prison administration failed to give legal due process in prison disciplinary hearings. Incarcerated women who had been held in solitary confinement brought a lawsuit for violation of due process. They won a $127,000 fund from an out-of-court settlement reached in 1981 after a federal District Court "held state authorities in contempt for failing to provide due process for inmates involved in disciplinary hearings."

A prisoners' committee chose to spend the fund for improving prison life; the top priority was a $10,000 lobbying fund to be used to press for merit time legislation to allow time off for good behavior. The committee's purchases also included word processors and a copier; recreational equipment such as roller skates; and legal services, including paying for lobbying to have merit time eligibility expanded under state law. An uprising occurred in the prison in November, 1981, that resulted in disciplinary reports against 61 inmates. The reports were exactly the opposite of the court's ruling, Mr. Coughlin observed, adding, You can't throw away due process by whim. The administrative staff was all demoted or transferred, and the disciplinary charges against the inmates were dropped. Thomas A. Coughlin, State Corrections Commissioner, stated in 1982 that the troubles at Bedford were the fault of the previous local administration.

== Notable people incarcerated at Bedford Hills ==
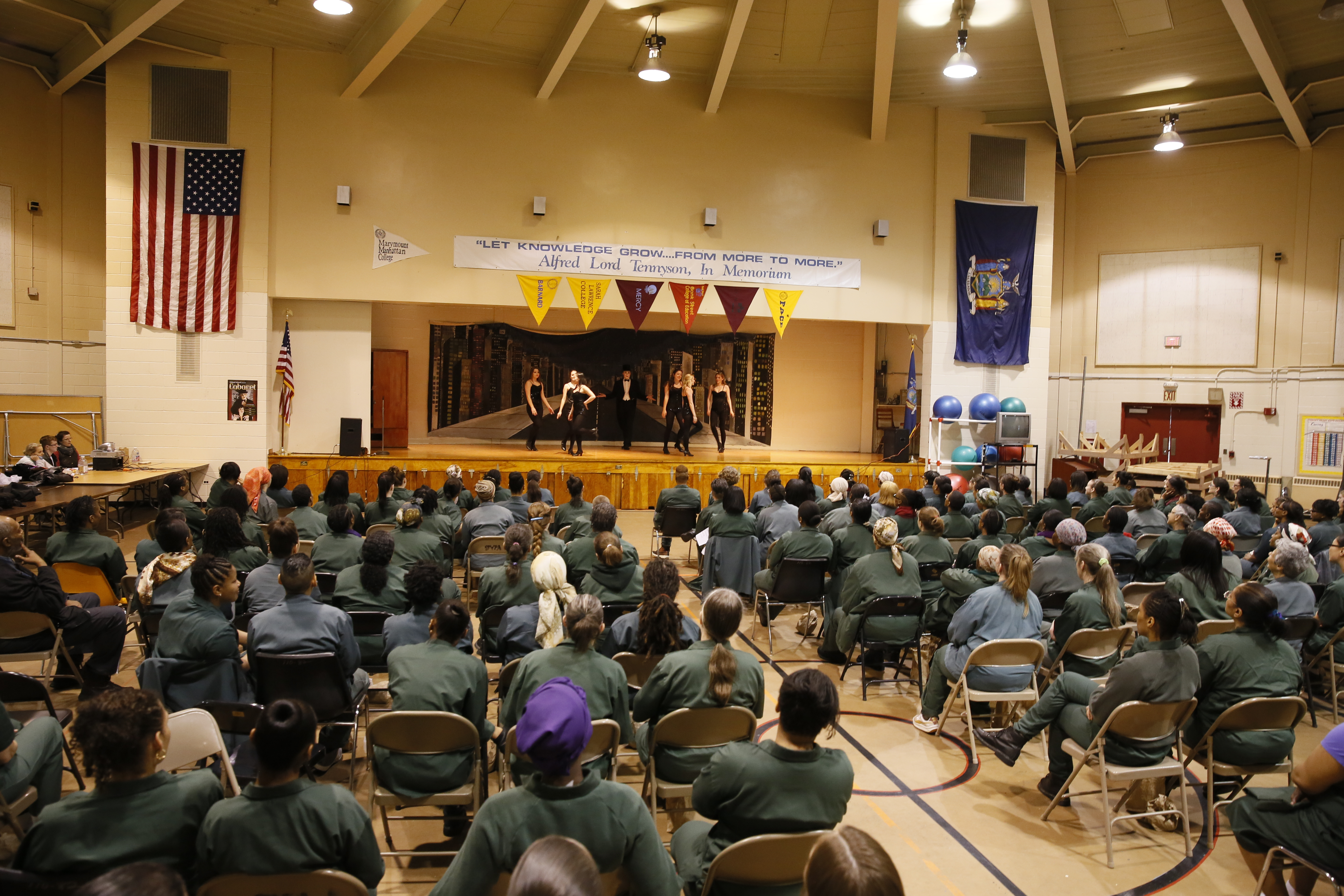
Felsted School students perform 'Cabaret' at Bedford Hills Correctional Facility (circa 2014)

- Kathy Boudin, a Weather Underground leftist convicted in 1984 for her involvement in the 1981 Brinks robbery that resulted in the killing of three people. She was sentenced to life in prison, became a public health expert while in prison, and was released on September 17, 2003, after serving 22 years. After her parole she accepted a job in the HIV/AIDS Clinic at St. Luke's-Roosevelt Hospital Center and as adjunct professor at Columbia University.
- Stacey Castor, wife who was charged in 2007 with second degree murder, second degree attempted murder, and offering a false instrument in the first degree. She was found guilty of intentionally poisoning then-husband David Castor with antifreeze in 2005 and attempting to murder her daughter Ashley Wallace. In addition, she was suspected of having murdered her first husband, Michael Wallace, whose grave lay next to David Castor's. After an autopsy performed on Michael Wallace's body found traces of antifreeze and rat poison in his remains, the medical examiner ruled the death a poisoning homicide. Castor was found dead in her cell on June 11, 2016, as a result of a heart attack.
- Judith Alice Clark, convicted in 1983 for her involvement in the same 1981 Brinks robbery as Kathy Boudin. She was not represented by counsel at trial and was sentenced to three consecutive life sentences at Bedford Hills. She was granted parole on April 17, 2019, after spending 38 years in prison. She was released on May 10, 2019. She co-founded the AIDS Counseling and Education (ACE) program at Bedford Hills, which has been emulated in prisons nationwide, and was instrumental in establishing a college program at Bedford Hills that has helped more than 100 prisoners earn college degrees.
- Carol Crooks, organizer for reform of prison conditions and due process for incarcerated people
- Amy Fisher, famously nicknamed "The Long Island Lolita" by the press, she was convicted of the 1992 shooting of the wife of her lover Joey Buttafuoco, with whom she began an affair as a 16-year-old student. She served seven years in prison and was released in 1999.
- Jean Harris murdered her ex-lover, Dr. Herman Tarnower, who was a cardiologist and author of the best-selling book The Scarsdale Diet. Eleven years after Harris's conviction, Governor Mario Cuomo commuted the remainder of her sentence on December 29, 1992, as she was being prepped for quadruple bypass heart surgery. She was released from prison by the parole board after serving 11 years and later moved to the Whitney Center, a retirement home in Hamden, Connecticut. She died on December 23, 2012, aged 89, at an assisted-living facility in New Haven, Connecticut.
- Katrina Haslip, co-founder of AIDS Counseling and Education at Bedford Hills and AIDS activist after release who was a major contributor to expanding eligibility for federal AIDS social security payments to more women and intravenous drug users
- Donna Hylton, was convicted of second degree murder and two counts of first degree kidnapping. She was sentenced to concurrent indeterminate prison terms of 25 years to life. She served 27 years in prison. After prison, Donna Hylton wrote the memoir A Little Piece of Light and founded a non profit with the same name which helps individuals who are directly impacted by trauma and involvement in the criminal justice system.
- Barbara Kogan; in October 1990, her husband George was shot on an Upper East Side Manhattan street. Kogan immediately became a suspect but was not convicted for nearly two decades, after she accepted a plea bargain admitting to conspiring to hire a hit man to kill her husband of 24 years because of a lengthy, acrimonious divorce.
- Reminisce Mackie, a rapper known as Remy Ma, got into an altercation with a friend inside a vehicle parked outside a club, when Mackie fired two shots in the woman's stomach. Mackie later turned herself in, and was charged with attempted murder and sentenced to eight years. Mackie was released on parole July 31, 2014.
- Joyce Mitchell assisted in the escape of inmates David Sweat and Richard Matt, and was sentenced to 2 1/3 to 7 years in prison. She was released on February 5, 2020.
- Yoselyn Ortega, perpetrator of the 2012 Murder of the Krim siblings. Ortega received two consecutive life sentences without the possibility of parole.
- Sante Kimes, Con-artist who was convicted of murder, robbery, burglary, conspiracy, grand larceny, illegal weapons possession, and forgery. Died in 2014.
- Joy Powell was charged with felony assault and burglary, though she claims the accusations are fabricated and politically motivated. She will be eligible for parole in the year 2045, when she is 84 years old.
- Nixzaliz Santiago, convicted of manslaughter in connection with the death of her daughter, Nixzmary Brown, and sentenced to 43 years in prison. Nixzmary's stepfather Cesar Rodriguez tortured Nixzmary (by binding her, duct-taping her mouth, and beat her), and her mother allegedly ignored this and didn't contact authorities in time to save her daughter's life.
- Pamela Smart, a former media services consultant found guilty in March 1991 for conspiring with her underage lover, William Flynn, and his three associates to kill her 24-year-old husband, Greggory Smart, in Derry, New Hampshire. She was transferred to Bedford Hills from the New Hampshire State Prison for Women in March 1993, because New Hampshire lacked a secure enough facility to house her. The higher security was necessary due to the high-profile nature of her case. She was sentenced to life in prison without the possibility for parole.
- Lacey Spears, serving 20 years to life for the murder of her son Garnett.
- Valerie Solanas, Radical feminist who attempted to assassinate pop artist Andy Warhol in 1968, spent a few weeks of her 3-year sentence at Bedford Hills in 1970 before being transferred back to Matteawan State Hospital for the Criminally Insane.
- Marybeth Tinning, serving 20 years to life in prison for the murder of several of her children. She was denied parole in March 2007 after serving 20 years in prison. Released from prison on August 21, 2018.
- Carolyn Warmus, former teacher convicted for the murder of Paul Solomon's wife Betty Jean to get closer with him. Warmus and Solomon were both teachers at the same school, and Warmus frequently visited the Solomons' house. Her first trial was a mistrial, but a new piece of evidence linked her to the murder, and Warmus was found guilty at her second trial. She faced the minimum of 15 years, but Judge Carey sentenced her to the maximum of 25-years-to-life in prison.
- Anna Sorokin, known by the alias Anna Delvey, is a Russian-born fraudster. She moved to New York City in 2013 and created the fictitious identity of Anna Delvey, pretending to be a wealthy German heiress. In 2019, she was convicted of multiple counts of attempted grand larceny, theft of services and larceny in the second degree for scamming New York City hotels and wealthy acquaintances.
- Blanche Wright, convicted of murder, as a hitwoman accomplice of The Council's contract killer Robert Young aka Miguel Sanchez's, and sentenced to Bedford Hills on November 11, 1980.
- Nicole Addimando, found guilty of second-degree murder of her boyfriend Chris Grover. She was sentenced to 19 years to life.
- Shirley Winters, suspected serial killer, child murderer and arsonist, Winters pleaded guilty to manslaughter on April 21, 2008. In May 2024, Winters was released from prison and sent to a psychiatric facility.

== See also ==
The Bedford Hills Correctional Facility participates in the program Puppies Behind Bars. PBB trains prison inmates to raise service dogs for wounded war veterans and first responders, as well as explosive-detection canines for law enforcement.
