= Shearman Haslip =

English cricketer

Shearman Montague Haslip (13 May 1897 – 4 July 1968) was an English first-class cricketer active 1919–20 who played for Middlesex and Marylebone Cricket Club. He was born in Twickenham; died in Weymouth.
