= Scorned: Love Kills =

American TV documentary series (2012–2016)

- Genre: Documentary
- Country of origin: United States
- No. of seasons: 6
- No. of episodes: 80

Production
- Executive producers: Diana Sperrazza; Dominic Stobart; Nicola Moody; Stephen McLaughlin
- Running time: 41 to 43 minutes
- Production companies: Optomen Productions, Inc

Original release
- Network: Investigation Discovery
- Release: January 21, 2012 – June 12, 2016

Scorned: Love Kills is an American television documentary series on Investigation Discovery that features tales of love gone fatally wrong. The series premiered on January 21, 2012; it was renewed for a second season, third season, and fourth season. The series ended in 2016, after its sixth season.

In the UK, the show is titled Scorned: Crimes of Passion.

Maryland based singer Niki Barr provides the vocals for the theme song.

== Episodes ==
Season	Episodes	Originally released	
Season	Episodes	First released	Last released
1	20	January 21, 2012	June 2, 2012
2	20	January 26, 2013	June 8, 2013
3	10	January 4, 2014	March 8, 2014
4	10	October 4, 2014	November 29, 2014
5	10	March 7, 2015	May 16, 2015
6	10	April 3, 2016	June 12, 2016

=== Season 1 (2012) ===
No. overall	No. in season	Title	Original release date
1	1	"Behind the Picket Fence"	January 21, 2012
Murder of David Shannon in Fayetteville, North Carolina
2	2	"Never Enough"	January 28, 2012
Murder of Stefanie Rabinowitz in Merion Station, Pennsylvania
3	3	"Desperate Housewife"	February 4, 2012
Murder of Brent Poole in Myrtle Beach, South Carolina
4	4	"Hot For Teacher"	February 11, 2012
Pamela Smart
5	5	"Afternoon Delight"	February 18, 2012
Murder of Trish Willoughby in Sonora
6	6	"The Showgirl and the Salesman"	February 25, 2012
Marjorie Ann Orbin
7	7	"Judgment Day"	March 3, 2012
Murder of Leann Fletcher in Hazel Park, Michigan
8	8	"The Au Pair Affair"	March 10, 2012
Murder of Tara Lynn Grant
9	9	"Letter From the Grave"	March 17, 2012
Murder of Julie Jensen
10	10	"House of Deception"	March 24, 2012
Murder of Rozanne Gailiunas in Richardson, Texas
11	11	"A Fatal Affair"	March 31, 2012
Murder of Shelley Dunn in Braselton, Georgia
12	12	"Hot and Sweet"	April 7, 2012
Carla Hughes
13	13	"Sunday School Killers"	April 14, 2012
Murder of Rob Andrew
14	14	"'Til Debt Do Us Part"	April 21, 2012
Barbara Stager
15	15	"Sneaking Suspicion"	April 28, 2012
Murder of Belinda Temple
16	16	"Crazy For You"	May 5, 2012
Murder of Jimmy Joste in Austin, Texas
17	17	"In The Closet"	May 12, 2012
Murder of Jeffrey Freeman in Brentwood, Tennessee
18	18	"Wigs and a Gun"	May 19, 2012
Murder of Fred Jablin in Richmond, Virginia
19	19	"Sub-Prime Murder"	May 26, 2012
Murder of Florence Unger in Watervale, Michigan
20	20	"Master of Seduction"	June 2, 2012
Murder of Mitchell Wayne Kemp in Fulton, Missouri

=== Season 2 (2013) ===
No. overall	No. in season	Title	Original release date
21	1	"Deadly Game"	January 26, 2013
Murder of Anna Lisa Raymundo in Stamford, Connecticut
22	2	"Blood on the Boardwalk"	February 2, 2013
Konstantinos Fotopoulos
23	3	"Mortal Sin"	February 9, 2013
Murder of Latrese Curtis in Raleigh, North Carolina
24	4	"Slave to Love"	February 16, 2013
Murder of Harry Mears in Greensburg, Pennsylvania
25	5	"Best Friends for Never"	February 23, 2013
Murder of Devon Guzman in Easton, Pennsylvania
26	6	"Devil Inside"	March 2, 2013
Coleman family murders
27	7	"Rules of Engagement"	March 9, 2013
Murder of Paul Berkley
28	8	"Love You to Death"	March 16, 2013
Murder of Sarah Rodriguez in Placentia, California
29	9	"The Millionaire's Mistress"	March 23, 2013
Murder of Lance Herndon in Roswell, Georgia
30	10	"Deadly Threesome"	March 30, 2013
Murder of Amy Gephart in Marengo, Iowa
31	11	"Killer Beauty"	April 6, 2013
Murder of Jeff Zack in Akron, Ohio
32	12	"Addicted to Sex"	April 13, 2013
Murder of John Newell in Orlando, Florida
33	13	"Deadly Attractions"	April 20, 2013
Murder of James Stropas in Norristown, Pennsylvania
34	14	"Bring On the Heat"	April 27, 2013
Murder of Denita Smith in Durham, North Carolina
35	15	"You've Got Hate Mail"	May 4, 2013
Murder of Bill Stout in Darby, Montana
36	16	"Fatal Fantasy"	May 11, 2013
Murder of Jennifer Corbin in Buford, Georgia
37	17	"Black Widower"	May 18, 2013
Drew Peterson
38	18	"Love Thy Rabbi"	May 25, 2013
Fred Neulander
39	19	"Shadow Stalker"	June 1, 2013
Murder of Mark Stover in Anacortes, Washington
40	20	"Love Is the Drug"	June 8, 2013
Murder of Regina Hartwell

=== Season 3 (2014) ===
No. overall	No. in season	Title	Original release date
41	1	"Naval Affairs"	January 4, 2014
Murder of Frederick Trayers in San Diego
42	2	"Caskets and Strippers"	January 11, 2014
Murder of Julie Bowling in Rocky Mount, North Carolina
43	3	"Lipstick Love Triangle"	January 18, 2014
Murder of Tzatzi Sanchez in Las Vegas
44	4	"God's Gift to Women"	January 25, 2014
Murder of Dawn Hacheney in Bremerton, Washington
45	5	"Roommates With Benefits"	February 1, 2014
Murder of Shane Hill in Boone, Iowa
46	6	"Bedside Manner"	February 8, 2014
Murder of David Stephens in Hattiesburg, Mississippi
47	7	"Tall, Dark and Deadly"	February 15, 2014
Murder of Chanin Starbuck in Deer Park, Washington
48	8	"Visions of Lust"	February 22, 2014
Murder of Faylene Grant in Gilbert, Arizona
49	9	"Slave for Love"	March 1, 2014
Murder of Jane Bashara
50	10	"Lover's Roulette"	March 8, 2014
Murder of Jim Durgan in Salida, Colorado

=== Season 4 (2014) ===
No. overall	No. in season	Title	Original release date
51	1	"Sergeant Swinger"	October 4, 2014
52	2	"Funeral Homewrecker"	October 4, 2014
53	3	"The Doctor Will See You Now"	October 11, 2014
54	4	"Sex on the Beach"	October 18, 2014
55	5	"The Virgin and the Bachelorette Party"	October 25, 2014
56	6	"Disco Queen"	November 1, 2014
57	7	"I’ll Have What She’s Having"	November 8, 2014
58	8	"Strippercam"	November 15, 2014
59	9	"Swing and a Missus"	November 22, 2014
60	10	"The Teacher's Pet"	November 29, 2014

=== Season 5 (2015) ===
No. overall	No. in season	Title	Original release date
61	1	"Mischief of Staff"	March 7, 2015
62	2	"Love Is a Battlefield"	March 14, 2015
63	3	"Fatal Prophet"	March 21, 2015
64	4	"The Doctor and the Beauty Queen"	April 4, 2015
65	5	"Sex, Secrets and Sergeants"	April 10, 2015
66	6	"Prisoner of Lust"	April 18, 2015
67	7	"Sex Lies and Hi-Fis"	April 25, 2015
68	8	"Married to the Mob"	May 2, 2015
69	9	"Handcuff for Three"	May 9, 2015
70	10	"Teacher, Teacher"	May 16, 2015

=== Season 6 (2016) ===
No. overall	No. in season	Title	Original release date
71	1	"Northern Exposure"	April 3, 2016
72	2	"Blunt Force Drama"	April 10, 2016
73	3	"Shot for Teacher"	April 17, 2016
74	4	"Kentucky Thrill Ride"	April 24, 2016
75	5	"Bear Down"	May 1, 2016
76	6	"Naughty Not Nice"	May 8, 2016
77	7	"Manhattan Murder Mistery"	May 15, 2016
78	8	"Heavy Betting"	May 29, 2016
79	9	"A Playbook for Murder"	June 5, 2016
80	10	"Marathon Lover"	June 12, 2016
