= Jill Neimark =

American writer

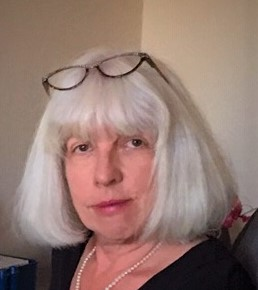
- Neimark in 2020
- Occupations: Author of adult and children's fiction and veteran science journalist
- Website: jillneimark.com

Jill Neimark is an American writer. Her April 2007 cover story in Discover Magazine, "Understanding Autism" won the 2007 award from the Autism Society of America.

== Career ==
Neimark has written one adult novel, a thriller titled Bloodsong, which was published in both hardcover and paperback, chosen by Book of The Month Club, and translated into German, Italian, and Hebrew. She has also published numerous children's books: I Want Your Moo (which was written with psychologist Marcella Bakur Weiner and translated and published in Spanish and Chinese), Toodles & Teeny, The Hugging Tree (which has been featured in dozens of read-a-louds around the world), The Secret Spiral and The Golden Rectangle, among others. She co-authored, with bioethicist Stephen Post, Why Good Things Happen to Good People, which was translated and published in Japan, Brazil, Russia, Portugal, India, Sweden, and Taiwan.

Neimark has also been published in The New York Times, Discover Magazine, Scientific American, Science, The Atlantic Monthly, Aeon, Undark Magazine, Sapiens, NPR, Nautilus and Psychology Today on topics ranging from biology and physics to the mind and the soul. She has written poetry and reviews for the Massachusetts Review, Borderlands, Cimarron Review, The Blue Nib, The Rumpus and The New York Quarterly. She was a contributing editor for Discover Magazine, and has published on subjects ranging from human evolution to curing HIV.

== Awards and honors ==
Her April 2007 cover story in Discover Magazine, "Understanding Autism" won the 2007 award from the Autism Society of America.

== Bibliography ==
- Ice Cream!, 1986, 64 pages, Hastings House Publishers, ISBN 978-0-8038-3440-8
- The Nose Knows, 1990, Hastings House Publishers, ISBN 978-0-8038-9297-2
- Bloodsong, 1993, 275 pages, Random House, ISBN 978-0-679-42005-7
- I Want Your Moo!: A Story for Children About Self-Esteem (Paperback), 1994, 32 pages, Magination Press, ISBN 978-0-945354-65-9 (with Marcella Bakur Weiner, and Jairo Barragan)reissued 2010, (Hardcover and Paperback)
- Why Good Things Happen to Good People: The Exciting New Research That Proves the Link Between Doing Good and Living a Longer, Healthier, Happier Life by Stephen Post, Ph.D. and Jill Neimark, 2007, 294 pages, Broadway Books, ISBN 978-0-7679-2017-9
- The Secret Spiral by Gillian Neimark, 2011, 210 pages, Aladdin, ISBN 978-1-4169-8040-7
- The Golden Rectangle by Gillian Neimark, 2013, Aladdin, ISBN 978-1-4169-8042-1
- Toodles & Teeny (Hardcover and Paperback), 2013, 32 pages, Magination Press, ISBN 978-1433811982
- The Hugging Tree (Hardcover and Paperback), 2015, 32 pages, Magination Press, ISBN 978-1433819087
