= Jacko Heaslip =

Irish cricketer

Cricket information
- Batting: Right-handed
- Bowling: Off spin

International information
- National side: Ireland

Career statistics
Competition	First-class
Matches	10
Runs scored	389
Batting average	21.61
100s/50s	0/1
Top score	92*
Balls bowled	1,677
Wickets	25
Bowling average	24.40
5 wickets in innings	2
10 wickets in match	0
Best bowling	5/67
Catches/stumpings	4/–
- Source: CricketArchive, 16 November 2022

John Ganly "Jacko" Heaslip (26 November 1899 – 23 May 1966) was an Irish cricketer. A right-handed batsman and off spin bowler, he played 18 times for the Ireland cricket team between 1920 and 1933, including eight first-class matches. He also played two first-class matches for Dublin University.

== Playing career ==
He made his debut for Ireland in July 1920 against Scotland in a first-class match. He played against the Irish military the next year in addition to another match against Scotland. In 1922 he played a first-class match for Dublin University against Essex, but did not represent Ireland.

He returned to the Irish side in 1923, playing that year against Scotland and Wales. He scored 96 against Wales, his highest score for Ireland. In 1924, he played against the MCC, Scotland and Wales, taking 5/67 against Scotland, his best bowling figures in first-class cricket. He also played a first-class match for Dublin University against Northamptonshire in June of that year.

He continued to play for Ireland over the following few years, mainly playing against the MCC and Scotland, with a match against the West Indies in 1928. He scored 92 not out against Scotland in 1927, his highest first-class score, and 5/49 against the MCC in 1926, his best bowling figures for Ireland. His international career finished with two matches against the MCC at Lord's in 1931 and 1933.

== Statistics ==
In all matches for Ireland, he scored 720 runs at an average of 25.71. He scored four half-centuries. He took 49 wickets at an average of 20.10. He took five wickets in an innings three times.
