= Terry M. McGovern =

American public health official and scholar

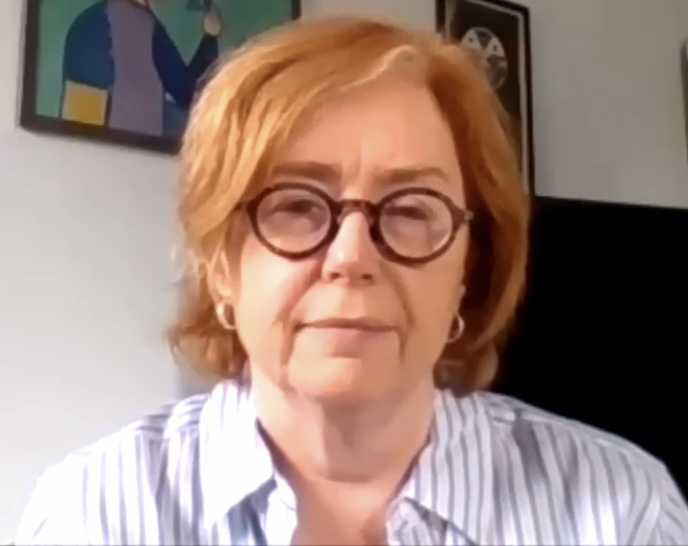
- McGovern on The Laura Flanders Show, March 2020
- Born: The Bronx, New York City, New York, U.S.
- Education: University at Albany; Georgetown University Law Center
- Children: 1

Terry M. McGovern is an American public health scholar. She is the Senior Associate Dean for Academic and Faculty Affairs at CUNY Graduate School of Public Health and Health Policy in New York City. McGovern is also Professor of Health Policy and Management.

== Early life and education ==
McGovern was born in the Bronx, New York. Her father (d. 2003) was first a truck driver and later an accountant, while her mother, Ann, worked in insurance. She attended University at Albany (State University of New York) with a union scholarship and graduated Summa Cum Laude in 1983. She received a J.D. from Georgetown University Law Center in 1986.

== Career ==
McGovern is known for her leadership as a health and human rights scholar addressing a number of issues including LGBT equality, environmental justice, sexual and reproductive health, and overall health outcomes for low-income women. Her legal work tackling health inequalities for low-income people living with HIV/AIDS in New York City, specifically women of color with HIV has led to numerous testimonials before Congress and other policy-makers. Her research focuses on health and human rights, sexual and reproductive rights and health, gender justice, and environmental justice, with publications appearing in journals including Lancet Child & Adolescent Health, Health and Human Rights, and the Journal of Adolescent Health. She has authored various publications and research articles challenging discriminatory norms.

From 2006-2012, McGovern was Senior Program Officer for Human Rights, HIV/AIDS, Gender Rights and Equality at the Ford Foundation.

Since 2020, McGovern is a member on the Council of Foreign Relations.

As of 2023, McGovern serves on the Lancet Commission on Adolescent Health and Wellbeing, the UCL-Lancet Commission on Migration and Health, and the UNAIDS Human Rights Reference Group. She currently serves on the UNFPA Global Advisory Council. She serves on the Board of the New York Civil Liberties Union (NYCLU).

In 2023, McGovern spearheaded the launch of the Byllye Avery Sexual and Reproductive Justice Endowed Professorship, the first endowed professorship in sexual and reproductive justice in the United States. In December 2023, the announcement of the professorship was launched with a panel discussion on the state of reproductive health moderated by Byllye Avery and Chelsea Clinton.

=== Work at Columbia University Mailman School of Public Health ===
McGovern has worked at Columbia University since the early 2000s. In 2004, she was an associate professor at the Mailman School of Public Health. In 2018, she began serving as director of the Heilbrunn Department of Population and Family Health's Program on Global Health Justice and Governance. In 2022, McGovern was the recipient of the Dean's Excellence in Leadership Award at the Columbia University Mailman School of Public Health. Until 2023, she was the Harriet and Robert H. Heilbrunn Professor and Chair of the department.

=== HIV/AIDS work ===
In 1989, McGovern founded the HIV Law Project and served as the Executive Director until 1999. While at the HIV Law Project, Terry McGovern litigated the groundbreaking case, S.P. v. Sullivan, which led to the Social Security Administration including HIV-related disability in their criteria. She also opposed a New York state law which mandates HIV testing on newborns, arguing that prenatal counseling would be more effective. She was appointed by President Bill Clinton to the National Task Force on AIDS Drug Development.

In 2017, she published an article with colleagues Johanna Fine, a human rights lawyer formerly with the Center for Reproductive Rights, Carolyn Crisp, and Emily Battistini, both Alumni from Columbia University's Mailman School of Public Health. The article demonstrated that Sustainable Development Goals have the potential to generate action and accountability to end the HIV epidemic among women and girls. In 2018, she published a study that examined the association between legal systems and health disparities in women and girls in Nigeria.

== 9/11 activism ==
McGovern's mother, Ann McGovern, was one of 175 Aon employees working in 2 World Trade Center who died during the September 11 attacks. McGovern's younger sister worked at the World Financial Center, and was safely evacuated. McGovern founded a group called 9/11 Families for Human Rights and was an advocate for accountability and transparency from the US Government in the September 11 Commission.

In 2007, a play she created based on interviews with family members of September 11 victims called "9/11: Voices Unheard," which was produced in collaboration with the Irondale Ensemble Project at the Theater for the New City. She later organized other 9/11 families to protest the “Muslim Ban” and has spoken out extensively in the exploitation of the September 11 attacks to justify xenophobia and discrimination.

== Publications ==
- McGovern, Terry; Fine, Johanna; Crisp, Carolyn; Battistini, Emily (December 2017). "As the HIV Epidemic among Young Women Grows, Can We Look to the SDGs to Reverse the Trend?". Health and Human Rights. 19 (2): 223–236. PMC 5739372. PMID 29302178.
- Mokdad A.H., Forouzanfar, M. H., and Daoud, F., [et al., including McGovern, T.] (2018). "Global burden of diseases, injuries, and risk factors for young people's health during 1990–2013: a systematic analysis for the Global Burden of Disease Study 2013". The Lancet. 387 (10036): 2383–2401. doi:10.1016/S0140-6736(16)00648-6. PMID 27174305.
- McGovern, Terry (March 2018). "Association between plural legal systems and sexual and reproductive health outcomes for women and girls in northern Nigeria: a regional and state-level ecological study from 1990 to 2013". The Lancet Global Health. 6: S4. doi:10.1016/S2214-109X(18)30133-5. ISSN 2214-109X.
- Santelli, J.; Spindler, E.; Moore, E.; McGovern, T. (2019). "Criminalising sexuality or preventing child marriage: legal interventions and girls' empowerment". Lancet Child & Adolescent Health. 3 (4): 206–208. doi:10.1016/S2352-4642(18)30370-5. PMC 6614741. PMID 30528683.

== Personal life ==
McGovern came out to her family in her 20s as a lesbian.

McGovern is a Democrat, but has described her views as "not easily defined". She is Irish-American, with all of her great-grandparents having been born in Ireland.
