= Murder in New Hampshire: The Pamela Wojas Smart Story =

1991 American television film by Joyce Chopra

- Genre: Crime; Drama; Thriller
- Written by: William Wood
- Directed by: Joyce Chopra
- Starring: Helen Hunt; Chad Allen; Ken Howard; Michael Learned
- Music by: Gary Chang
- Country of origin: United States
- Original language: English

Production
- Executive producers: Robert Greenwald; Carla Singer
- Producer: Philip K. Kleinbart
- Production location: Charlotte, North Carolina
- Cinematography: James Glennon
- Editor: Robert Florio
- Running time: 100 minutes
- Production company: Robert Greenwald Productions

Original release
- Network: CBS
- Release: September 24, 1991

Murder in New Hampshire: The Pamela Smart Story is a 1991 American made-for-television crime drama film based on the true story of Pamela Smart seducing one of her 15-year-old students into sex and to murdering her husband, Gregg Smart, in Derry, New Hampshire. It is directed by Joyce Chopra and stars Helen Hunt as Pamela Smart and Chad Allen as Billy Flynn, her 15-year-old lover. It originally aired on CBS on September 24, 1991, where it ranked #1 for the evening with a 15.9 rating and 26.0 share.

== Plot ==
The film opens to the murder. Two teenage boys are holding a knife to the throat of a man. They are demanding his wedding ring, and he is begging for his life. The boy holding the knife says he cannot do it. Another boy draws a pistol, says "God Forgive me", and shoots him to death. The boys run out of the house to a getaway car with two more teens waiting.

The scene then cuts to a courtroom. The prosecuting attorney explains to the court that Ms. Smart coerced the boys into the murder of her husband. The scene then cuts to a flashback, where Gregg Smart calls the home of his then-fiancée Pam. He tells her that he got a job at a New Hampshire insurance company, and that she should pack her bags. When he arrives, she notices that he has had his hair cut, and expresses her disapproval. The next scene shows their wedding. As they are about to drive off, she tells her new parents-in-law that she is thankful that they have been so good to her. Pamela soon applies for a job at a news station, but is turned down. She then gets a job as a media director at a high school, where she begins an Anti-Drug campaign. For the drug campaign, she meets several students, including Billy Flynn and Cecelia Pierce. After the meeting, she drives Cecelia and Billy home, dropping off Cecelia first. When Billy and Pam are alone in the car, they learn of their shared fandom of Van Halen, and Pam says she used to work on a radio station and met the band then.

Later on, Billy, Pam, and Cecelia learn of a contest to make an advertisement for orange juice, which has a cash prize and a trip to Florida. They decide to make a music video for it, Billy being the cameraman. Soon after, Cecelia expresses her interest of going into a similar field to Pam, who offers to let her be her intern. Cecelia accepts, and tells Pam that Billy has a "major crush" on her. On one occasion, Pam and Billy go to a nightclub together, despite Billy's mother's disapproval. One day of filming the music video, Pam asks Billy if she could shower at his house, he says that was okay. Afterward, Billy and Pam talk in his bedroom, and they soon begin to kiss each other passionately. Pam soon pulls away and tells Billy that she is married. However, soon Billy is at his friend's house. He tells his friend that his Mom believes he is sleeping over there, so if she calls he should pretend he cannot come to the phone, but in reality he is going to Pam's and that her husband is out of town. When asked if they plan to have sex, Billy says "I hope so." At Pam's, they do end up going upstairs and having sex for the first time.

When Pam is driving Billy home one day, she tells him they have to break up. Billy asks her why, and she says that Gregg rarely goes out of town like that, and that she wants to be with Billy always. She tells him that the only way they could be together is if he murders her husband. Billy suggests that she divorce Gregg, but she says that all they own is made out to him, and he would get all of it. He also has had a history of beating her, and is afraid for her safety if she leaves him. She tells him that he will also pay his friends $1,000 to kill her husband. On two separate occasions, Billy says he and his friends will kill Gregg, but both times he does not, and Pam reacts with anger, and threatens to tell Gregg of the whole situation. Billy tells his friends that he would commit suicide if he lost Pam. On the third occasion, they succeed in killing him. When questioned by the police and media, Pam adamantly claims that her husband was not a violent person, nor was he involved with illegal drugs. Meanwhile, an anonymous caller tells the Police that Cecelia knew about the plot. The police immediately question Cecelia, who eventually admits to the story being true. Billy and his friends are arrested, as is Pam. Billy is offered a reduced sentence if he testifies against Pam, and his friends talk him into it. The movie ends in the courtroom again. The jury finds Pamela to be guilty, and she is sentenced to life in prison without the possibility of parole and Billy is sentenced to life in prison with the possibility of parole after 28 years.

== Cast ==
- Helen Hunt as Pamela Smart
- Chad Allen as William Flynn
- Larry Drake as Mark Sisti
- Riff Reagan as Cecelia Pierce
- Hank Stratton as Gregg Smart
- Howard Hesseman as Paul Maggioto
- Ken Howard as Bill Smart
- Michael Learned as Judy Smart
- Sean Bridgers as Ralph Welch
- Jennifer Hayes Malone as Cecelia's Friend
- Richard K. Olsen as Detective #1
- J. Michael Hunter as Detective #2
