= Ruth Clark (pollster) =

American pollster (1917–1997)

Ruth Clark (1917 – February 20, 1997) was an American pollster and researcher. Her 1979 report The Changing Needs of Changing Readers was influential on the renewal of American newspapers, leading to a greater focus on service journalism and local news.

== Biography ==
Ruth Clark was born Ruth Fine in 1917 in New York City. She graduated from Hunter College in 1936. A Communist in her youth, she moved to Moscow in 1950 with her husband Joseph Clark, foreign editor for the Daily Worker; they became disillusioned with the Soviet regime and returned to the United States in 1953.

Clark worked as a door-to-door interviewer for marketing campaigns during the 1950s. In 1960 she was hired by Louis Harris' firm, working for John F. Kennedy campaign. Clark was credited to introducing exit polls in American election surveys. She became vice-president of Louis Harris and Associates in the 1960s, moving to Yankelovich, Skelly & White around 1970.

=== The Changing Needs of Changing Readers survey ===
In 1979, the American Society of Newspaper Editors, concerned about the declining readership of newspapers, commissioned a study for analysing that situation. Clark, vice-president at Yankelovich, Skelly & White, conducted a survey with 120 readers in a dozen focal groups; the readers said they felt alienated by the newspapers' focus on hard national, political news, they wanted more palatable local news stories and everyday tips. Clark's findings were published in the report The Changing Needs of Changing Readers. The report influenced newspapers in the United States and around the world; its findings translated into innovations in news coverage, like the increased focus on local stories, "news you can use" and the modular layout of pages, which were adopted by several outlets, especially USA Today.

In 1983, Clark left Yankelovich, Skelly and White to found her own firm, Clark, Martire & Bartolomeo. They conducted surveys for newspapers such as The New York Times, The New York Daily News and The Chicago Tribune.

Clark died on February 20, 1997, of lung cancer.

== Personal life ==
Ruth Clark was married to Joseph Clark (d. 1988). She had two children: radical activist Judith Clark (born 1949), and Andrew.
