= Judith Alice Clark =

American radical political activist

Judith Alice Clark (born November 9, 1949), known as Judy Clark, is an American far-left radical activist, formerly a member of the Weather Underground and the May 19th Communist Organization (M19). Her mother was the researcher Ruth Clark. In 1967, she took up studies at the University of Chicago, where she joined Students for a Democratic Society (SDS) and later co-founded the Weather Underground, participating in the Days of Rage. She went underground, was arrested and briefly incarcerated; afterwards she lived in New York City, co-founding M19. In the early 1980s, M19 linked with the Black Liberation Army (BLA) as The Family in order to carry out bank robberies to support revolutionary struggle. Clark was arrested driving a getaway car after the October 1981 Brink's robbery in Nanuet, New York, in which a security guard and two Nyack, New York police officers were shot and killed.

At trial, she was sentenced to three consecutive 25 to life terms for murder in the second degree, which she served at the Bedford Hills Correctional Facility in New York. Whilst incarcerated, she carried out HIV/AIDS activism, published in Social Justice, participated in a scheme to train service dogs for military veterans, assisted a chaplain and ran prenatal and infant support workshops for mothers. In 2016, Governor of New York Andrew Cuomo commuted her sentence to 35 years to life, making her eligible for parole. She was denied parole in 2017 and granted it in 2019.

== Early life ==
Judith Alice Clark was born in November 9, 1949, in New York City to a Jewish family. Her parents were the researcher Ruth Clark and journalist Joseph Clark. They were members of the Communist Party USA and moved to the Soviet Union in 1950 with Clark and her brother Andy. Joe Clark worked as foreign editor of the Daily Worker newspaper until the family returned to Brooklyn, New York City, in 1953, living in Bensonhurst and then Flatbush. By the late 1950, her parents had withdrawn from the Communist Party, disillusioned by events such as the Soviet repression of the Hungarian Revolution of 1956. Her mother pursued a career working for a polling firm and pioneered the exit poll; her father co-founded the American Left magazine Dissent.

Clark attended the Midwood High School in Brooklyn and as her parents moved towards anti-communism, she retained an interest in Left-wing politics. In 1967, she took up studies at the University of Chicago, where she joined Students for a Democratic Society (SDS). After she and other students occupied a university building in 1969 as protest in support of a sociology professor who had been refused tenure, Clark was expelled from the university. Her father asked Saul Bellow to appeal to the university president, Edward H. Levi who maintained she had to leave. She co-founded the Weather Underground, which emerged from SDS.

== Weather Underground ==
Clark participated in the Days of Rage in Chicago in 1969. She was arrested alongside other Weather Underground activists including Kathy Boudin and went underground to evade the charges against her. The following year, the FBI apprehended her in a movie theater in Manhattan, New York City. After serving her sentence, (Note: The New York Times reported her sentence as 18 months in 1983 and 9 months in 2012.) Clark worked at a bookshop and co-founded the May 19th Communist Organization (M19) with Boudin, Linda Evans, and David Gilbert. She was kept under surveillance and in 1972 her apartment was illegally searched three times by the FBI.

Two months after her release, there was a prison uprising at Attica. In its wake, Clark was one of the founders of The Midnight Special, a newspaper affiliated with the National Lawyers Guild. Clark was also a member of the Women's Bail Fund and worked in support of political prisoners. Clark decided she wanted to have a child as a lesbian and asked Alan Berkman to be the sperm donor. She gave birth to Harriet Josina Clark on November 13, 1980.

== Brink's robbery ==
On October 20, 1981, members of the Black Liberation Army (BLA) and May 19th Communist Organization (M19) assembled at a safe house in Mount Vernon, New York. Those present included Kuwasi Balagoon, Boudin, Samuel Brown, Marilyn Jean Buck, Clark, Cecil Ferguson, David Gilbert, Edward Josephs, Susan Rosenberg, Mtajori Sandiata and Mutulu Shakur.

The gang drove to the mall at Nanuet, New York in four vehicles; Clark was driving a Honda. When two guards took money from the Nanuet National Bank towards a Brink's armored car, the BLA members opened fire and killed one of them, Peter Paige. The gang stole around $1.6 million in cash and made their getaway. Local police set up a roadblock and stopped a vehicle, leading to a second gunfight in which Nyack police officers Waverly Brown and Edward O'Grady were both killed. Clark drove the Honda onto Mountainview Avenue with Brown and Gilbert as passengers. After her car was chased at speed by South Nyack Police Chief Alan Colsey, Clark crashed and the three people inside were arrested.

At trial, Clark was at first represented by Susan Tipograph. She then claimed she was a freedom fighter and thus a prisoner of war. Alongside her fellow defendants Balagoon and Gilbert, she refused to attend court except to make political statements and listened to proceedings from her detention cell. Hearings began in September 1982 at New City, New York then were moved to Goshen. On September 14, 1983, Balagoon, Clark and Gilbert were all found guilty of the three murders and armored robbery. They were each sentenced to three consecutive 25 to life terms for murder in the second degree. Clark had been observed at the Manhattan Criminal Court during a hearing related to the case of Assata Shakur and was therefore also suspected of being involved with Shakur's later escape from the Clinton Correctional Facility for Women in 1979.

== Incarceration ==
Clark served her sentence at the Bedford Hills Correctional Facility for Women, as did Boudin. For the first month, Clark was placed in solitary confinement. Whilst incarcerated, she participated in a creative writing group run by the author Eve Ensler and featured in a 2003 documentary about the group called What I Want My Words to Do To You.

Clark obtained bachelor's and master's degrees in prison. Alongside other female inmates, she carried out HIV/AIDS activism, protesting against the staff policy of isolating people with HIV and wearing gloves and masks when interacting with them. With Boudin she published "Community of Women Organize Themselves to Cope with the AIDS Crisis: A Case Study from Bedford Hill Correctional Facility" in the academic journal Social Justice. She also participated in a program to train service dogs for military veterans, assisted a chaplain and founded prenatal and infant support workshops for mothers. Clark's attorney Sara Bennett created a pamphlet entitled Spirit on the Inside: Reflections on Doing Time with Judith Clark in which she photographed 15 women who had been incarcerated alongside Clark and interviewed them about her. Clark said in 1994 that she had "enormous regret, sorrow and remorse" about her part in the robbery and in 2002, she published a public apology in The Journal News to all the victims of the Family's violence. Clark's daughter Harriet was raised by family members who brought her to visit the prison every weekend.

David Mamet's 2012 play The Anarchist featured two female characters inspired by Boudin, Clark and Cathy Wilkerson. Clark was also the inspiration for the role of Hannah, performed by Dame Harriet Walter in the 2016 Donmar Warehouse production of Shakespeare's The Tempest.

== Release ==
In 2016, governor of New York Andrew Cuomo recognised Clark's good behavior in prison and commuted her sentence, which meant that she would be eligible for parole the following year. At the seven hour long hearing, the three parole board members voted unanimously to deny her request for release, saying they had received thousands of letters from people who wanted her to serve a longer sentence for her crimes.

The parole board voted by two to one to release Clark from the Bedford Hills Correctional Facility in 2019. The decision was backed by the New York Civil Liberties Union and opposed by the Sergeants Benevolent Association.

== In fiction ==
In 2026, Harriet Clark published a novel titled The Hill. Harriet Clark is the daughter of Judith Clark. The Hill is a work of fiction though it incorporates elements that parallel the lives of both mother and daughter. In the book, Suzanna Klein is an infant when her mother is involved in a bank robbery that leads to a homicide. The mother is sentenced to life in prison while Suzanna spends years growing up with her maternal grandmother and frequently visiting her mother in prison.

== Selected works ==
- Clark, Judy; Boudin, Kathy (1990). "Community of Women Organize Themselves to Cope with the AIDS Crisis: A Case Study from Bedford Hills Correctional Facility". Social Justice. 17 (2 (40)): 90–109. ISSN 1043-1578. JSTOR 29766543.
- Fine, M.; Torre, M.E; Boudin, K.; Bowen, I.; Clark, J.; Hylton, D.; Martinez, M.; Missy; Rivera, M.; Roberts, R.A.; Smart, P.; Upegui, D. (2003). "Participatory action research: Within and beyond bars". In Camic, P.; Rhodes, J.E.; Yardley, L. (eds.). Qualitative research in psychology: Expanding perspectives in methodology and design. Washington, D.C.: American Psychological Association. pp. 173–198.
