= Reparations for slavery in the United States =

Reparations for slavery is the application of the concept of reparations to victims of slavery or their descendants. There are concepts for reparations in legal philosophy and reparations in transitional justice. In the US, reparations for slavery have been both given by legal ruling in court and/or given voluntarily (without court rulings) by individuals and institutions.

The first recorded case of reparations for slavery in the United States was to former slave Belinda Royall in 1783, in the form of a pension, and since then reparations continue to be proposed. To the present day, no federal reparations bills have been passed. The 1865 Special Field Orders No. 15 ("Forty acres and a mule") is the most well known attempt to help newly freed slaves integrate into society and accumulate wealth. However, President Andrew Johnson reversed this order, giving the land back to its former Confederate owners.

Reparations have been a recurring idea in the politics of the United States, most recently in the 2020 Democratic Party presidential primaries. The call for reparations intensified in 2020, amidst the protests against police brutality and the COVID-19 pandemic, which both kill Black Americans disproportionately. Calls for reparations for racism and discrimination in the US are often made by black communities and authors alongside calls for reparations for slavery. The idea of reparations remains highly controversial, due to questions of how they would be given, how much would be given, who would pay them, and who would receive them.

Forms of reparations which have been proposed in the United States by city, county, state, and national governments or private institutions include: individual monetary payments, settlements, scholarships, waiving of fees, and systemic initiatives to offset injustices, land-based compensation related to independence, apologies and acknowledgements of the injustices, token measures (such as naming a building after someone), and the removal of monuments and streets named to slave owners and defenders of slavery.

Since further injustices and discrimination have continued since slavery was outlawed in the US, some black communities and civil rights organizations have called for reparations for those injustices as well as for reparations directly related to slavery. Some suggest that the US prison system, starting with the convict lease system and continuing through the present-day government-owned corporation Federal Prison Industries (UNICOR), is a modern form of legal slavery that still primarily and disproportionately affects black populations and other minorities via the war on drugs and what has been criticized as a school-to-prison pipeline.

== US historical context ==
=== In colonial times ===
The debate on reparations reaches as far back as the eighteenth century. Quakers, who were some of the first abolitionists in the United States, almost unanimously insisted that freed slaves were entitled to compensation from their former owners. If an owner repented of his sin of owning a chattel slave, he needs to atone for it by making amends. Quakers cited the book of Deuteronomy, in which owners were exhorted to share their goods with former slaves.

During the Revolutionary War, Warner Mifflin advocated for restitution for freed ex-slaves as early as 1778, in the form of cash payments, land, and shared crop arrangements. Gary B. Nash writes that, "he may fairly be called the father of American reparation".

=== Before the Civil War ===
Well before slavery was abolished nationally in 1865, abolitionists presented suggestions on what could or should be done to compensate the enslaved workers after their liberation.

Early in 1859, in a book dedicated to "Old Hero" John Brown, James Redpath declared himself a "reparation advocate", and implies that in his view, the lands of the Confederacy should be given to the ex-slaves. He also quotes an earlier poem, by William North, that refers to "the course of reparation".

Later that year, after Brown's execution, Redpath reported in the first biography of Brown that he was not merely an emancipationist, but a reparation advocate. He believed, not only that the crime of slavery should be abolished, but that reparation should be made for the wrongs that had been done to the slave. What he believed, he practiced. On this occasion [Missouri raid, 1859], after telling the slaves that they were free, he asked them how much their services had been worth, and—having been answered—proceeded to take property to the amount thus due to the negroes."

Calls for permanent confiscation and redistribution of plantation lands had already been made by Representatives George W. Julian and Thaddeus Stevens, both of the Radical Republican faction.

=== The Reconstruction period ===
The arguments surrounding reparations are based on the formal discussion about many different reparations, and actual land reparations received by African Americans which were later taken away. In 1865, after the Confederate States of America were defeated in the American Civil War, General William Tecumseh Sherman issued Special Field Orders, No. 15 to both "assure the harmony of action in the area of operations" and to solve problems caused by the masses of freed slaves, a temporary plan granting each freed family forty acres of tillable land in the sea islands and around Charleston, South Carolina for the exclusive use of black people who had been enslaved. The army also had a number of unneeded mules which were given to freed slaves. Around 40,000 freed slaves were settled on 400,000 acres (1,600 km^{2}) in Georgia and South Carolina. However, after Lincoln was assassinated, President Andrew Johnson reversed the order. The land was returned to its previous owners, and black people were forced to leave. In 1867, Thaddeus Stevens sponsored a bill for the redistribution of land to African Americans, but it did not pass.

Reconstruction came to an end in 1877 without the issue of reparations having been addressed. Thereafter, a deliberate movement of segregation and oppression arose in Southern states. Jim Crow laws were passed in some Southeastern states to reinforce the existing inequality that slavery had produced. In addition, white extremist organizations such as the Ku Klux Klan engaged in a massive campaign of terrorism throughout the Southeast in order to keep African Americans in their prescribed social place. For decades this assumed inequality and injustice was ruled on in court decisions and debated in public discourse.

In one anomalous case, a former slave named Henrietta Wood successfully sued for compensation after having been kidnapped from the free state of Ohio and sold into slavery in Mississippi. After the American Civil War, she was freed and returned to Cincinnati, where she won her case in federal court in 1878, receiving $2,500 (~$83,405 in 2025) in damages. Though the verdict was a national news story, it did not prompt any trend toward additional similar cases.

=== Post-Reconstruction Era ===
In 1896, the National Ex-Slave Mutual Relief, Bounty and Pension Association (MRB&PA) was founded for the purpose of obtaining pensions for former slaves from the Federal government as compensation and reparations for their unpaid labor and suffering. Chartered in 1898 in Nashville, Tennessee, the organization was founded by former slaves Callie House and Isaiah H. Dickerson. According to some historians, the organization was "the first mass reparations movement led by African Americans." The organization and its leaders were hounded with false allegations and criminal prosecutions until its last local branches closed in the 1930s.

In 1915, under Callie House's leadership, the association filed a class-action lawsuit, Johnson v. McAdoo, in federal court against the US Treasury Department for 68 million dollars. $68 million was the amount of cotton tax collected between 1862 and 1868 and, it was argued, was due to the plaintiffs because this cotton had been produced by them and their ancestors as a result of their involuntary servitude. This was the first documented Black reparations litigation in the US on the federal level. The US Court of Appeals for the District of Columbia denied the claim based on governmental immunity as did the US Supreme Court, siding with the Appeals Court's decision.

=== 2020 ===
The topic became a prominent theme during the 2020 Democratic Party presidential primaries as concerns surrounding race were heightened due to current events. It was further amplified because of African-American people were dying prematurely and disproportionately due to the COVID-19 pandemic. Ongoing systemic racism and police brutality also sparked outrage across the country, notably the killing of Breonna Taylor, a 26-year-old African-American emergency medical technician, fatally shot by Louisville Metro Police Department in her home; the murder of Ahmaud Arbery, shot while out for a run by three white men in Georgia; and the murder of George Floyd, a Black American killed during an arrest by Minneapolis police after allegedly passing a counterfeit $20 bill, that sparked the nationwide George Floyd protests.

Candidates that endorsed the idea included:

- Andrew Yang supported H.R. 40, the Commission to Study and Develop Reparation Proposals for African-Americans Act, sponsored by Rep. Sheila Jackson Lee, while speaking on the Karen Hunter show.
- Marianne Williamson detailed a plan for reparations in an interview for Ebony Magazine.
- Senators Elizabeth Warren and Cory Booker have both indicated some level of support for reparations, according to NPR.
- Tulsi Gabbard was a cosponsor of H.R. 40, the only piece of legislation in Congress to study and develop reparations proposals and Bernie Sanders was a co-sponsor for the Senate version of the bill.

Kamala Harris declared in April 2019 she supports reparations.

Beto O'Rourke is "open to considering some form of reparations," according to U.S. News & World Report.

Tom Steyer in the 2020 Democratic Primaries Debate in South Carolina voiced his support for reparations.

== Proposals for reparations ==
=== United States government ===
Some proposals have called for direct payments from the US government. Various estimates have been given if such payments were to be made. Harper's Magazine estimated that the total of reparations due was about "$97 trillion, based on 222,505,049 hours of forced labor between 1619 and 1865, regardless the United States wasn't a recognized independent country until after the Revolutionary War in 1787, compounded at 6% interest through 1993". Should all or part of this amount be paid to the descendants of slaves in the United States, the current US government would only pay a fraction of that cost, since it has been in existence only since 1789. For two centuries, from the 1700s until World War I, the average wage for one day's unskilled labor in America was one dollar.

According to the Brookings Institution, in 1860, over $3 billion (~$87.5 billion in 2025) was the value assigned to the physical bodies of enslaved Black Americans to be used as free labor and production. This was more money than was invested in factories and railroads combined. In 1861, the value placed on cotton produced by enslaved Blacks was $250 million (~$7.03 billion in 2025). "For the descendants of the 12.5 million Blacks who were shipped in chains from Western Africa, 'America has a genetic birth defect when it comes to the question of race,' as stated recently by US representative Hakeem Jeffries. If America is to atone for this defect, reparations for Black Americans is part of the healing and reconciliation process."

Reverend M. J. Divine was one of the earliest leaders to argue clearly for "retroactive compensation", and the message was spread via International Peace Mission publications. On July 28, 1951, Father Divine issued a "peace stamp" bearing the text: "Peace! All nations and peoples who have suppressed and oppressed the under-privileged, they will be obliged to pay the African slaves and their descendants for all uncompensated servitude and for all unjust compensation, whereby they have been unjustly deprived of compensation on the account of previous condition of servitude and the present condition of servitude. This is to be accomplished in the defense of all other under-privileged subjects and must be paid retroactive up-to-date".

At the first National Reparations Convention in Chicago in 2001, a proposal by Howshua Amariel, a Chicago social activist, would require the federal government to make reparations to proven descendants of slaves. In addition, Amariel stated "For those blacks who wish to remain in America, they should receive reparations in the form of free education, free medical, free legal and free financial aid for fifty years with no taxes levied," and "For those desiring to leave America, every black person would receive a million dollars or more, backed by gold, in reparation." At the convention Amariel's proposal received approval from the 100 or so participants. Nevertheless, the question of who would receive such payments, who should pay them and in what amount, has remained highly controversial, since the United States Census does not track descent from slaves or slave owners and relies on self-reported racial categories.

On July 30, 2008, the United States House of Representatives passed a resolution apologizing for American slavery and subsequent discriminatory laws.

Nine states have officially apologized for their involvement in the enslavement of Africans. Those states are:

- Alabama – April 25, 2007
- Connecticut
- Delaware – February 11, 2016
- Florida – 2008
- Maryland – 2007
- New Jersey – 2008
- North Carolina – 2007
- Tennessee
- Virginia – 2007

=== Private institutions ===
Private institutions and corporations were also involved in slavery. On March 8, 2000, Reuters News Service reported that Deadria Farmer-Paellmann, a law school graduate, initiated a one-woman campaign making a historic demand for restitution and apologies from modern companies that played a direct role in enslaving Africans. Aetna Inc. was her first target because of their practice of writing life insurance policies on the lives of enslaved Africans with slave owners as the beneficiaries. In response to Farmer-Paellmann's demand, Aetna Inc. issued a public apology, and the "corporate restitution movement" was born.

By 2002, nine lawsuits were filed around the country coordinated by Farmer-Paellmann and the Restitution Study Group—a New York non-profit. The litigation included 20 plaintiffs, demanding restitution from 20 companies from the banking, insurance, textile, railroad, and tobacco industries. The cases were consolidated under 28 U.S.C. 1407 to multidistrict litigation in the United States District Court for the Northern District of Illinois. The district court dismissed the lawsuits with prejudice, and the claimants appealed to the United States Court of Appeals for the Seventh Circuit.

On December 13, 2006, that court, in an opinion written by Judge Richard Posner, modified the district court's judgment to be a dismissal without prejudice, affirmed the majority of the district court's judgment, and reversed the portion of the district court's judgment dismissing the plaintiffs' consumer protection claims, remanding the case for further proceedings consistent with its opinion. Thus, the plaintiffs may bring the lawsuit again, but must clear considerable procedural and substantive hurdles first:

If one or more of the defendants violated a state law by transporting slaves in 1850, and the plaintiffs can establish standing to sue, prove the violation despite its antiquity, establish that the law was intended to provide a remedy (either directly or by providing the basis for a common law action for conspiracy, conversion, or restitution) to lawfully enslaved persons or their descendants, identify their ancestors, quantify damages incurred, and persuade the court to toll the statute of limitations, there would be no further obstacle to the grant of relief.

In October 2000, California passed the Slavery Era Disclosure Law requiring insurance companies doing business there to report on their role in slavery. The disclosure legislation, introduced by Senator Tom Hayden, is the prototype for similar laws passed in 12 states around the United States.

The NAACP has called for more of such legislation at local and corporate levels. It quotes Dennis C. Hayes, CEO of the NAACP, as saying, "Absolutely, we will be pursuing reparations from companies that have historical ties to slavery and engaging all parties to come to the table." Brown University, whose namesake family was involved in the slave trade, has also established a committee to explore the issue of reparations. In February 2007, Brown University announced a set of responses to its Steering Committee on Slavery and Justice. While in 1995 the Southern Baptist Convention apologized for the "sins" of racism, including slavery.

In December 2005, a boycott was called by a coalition of reparations groups under the sponsorship of the Restitution Study Group. The boycott targets the student loan products of banks deemed complicit in slavery—particularly those identified in the Farmer-Paellmann litigation. As part of the boycott, students are asked to choose from other banks to finance their student loans.

Pro-reparations groups such as the National Coalition of Blacks for Reparations in America advocate for compensation to be in the form of community rehabilitation and not payments to individual descendants.

=== Black Lives Matter ===
Many groups under the Black Lives Matter organization have laid out a list of demands, some of which include: reparations, for what they say are past and continuing harms to African Americans, an end to the death penalty, legislation to acknowledge the effects of slavery as well as investments in education initiatives, mental health services, and jobs programs. These calls for reparations have been bolstered amidst the COVID-19 pandemic and the high rates of police brutality against Blacks.

== Arguments for reparations ==
=== Accumulated wealth ===
Housing discrimination played a major role in creating the racial wealth gap that exists today. After the Great Migration of Southern blacks to Chicago and other northern cities in the 1940s, redlining was used to keep former slaves segregated from whites and to prevent black families from getting a mortgage. Thus they were forced to buy houses on contracts from real estate speculators, which were a scam. Not only did this cause thousands of Black Americans to lose their homes and their money, it also created what are known today as ghettos and prevented Blacks from accumulating wealth. Today, the average white family has roughly 10 times the amount of wealth as the average black family, and white college graduates have over seven times more wealth than Black college graduates.

The wealth of the United States was greatly enhanced by the exploitation of African-American slave labor: some argue it is the bedrock for the US economy and capitalism. However, former slaves and their descendants are among the poorest demographic in America. According to this view, reparations would be valuable primarily as a way of correcting modern economic imbalances.

In 2008 the American Humanist Association published an article which argued that if emancipated slaves had been allowed to possess and retain the profits of their labor, their descendants might now control a much larger share of American social and monetary wealth. Not only did the freedmen not receive a share of these profits, but they were stripped of the small amounts of compensation paid to some of them during Reconstruction. Therefore, many scholars and activists call for reparations to eliminate "racial disparities in wealth, income, education, health, sentencing and incarceration, political participation, and subsequent opportunities to engage in American political and social life".

=== Health care ===
In 2019, VICE magazine published an article that argued racial health disparities, from slavery through Jim Crow until today, have cost Black Americans a significant amount of money in health care expenses and lost wages, and should be paid back. Ray and Perry state in a Brookings article that the lack of a social safety net and the wealth gap are particularly highlighted during the COVID-19 pandemic. They explain that "disparities in access to health care along with inequities in economic policies combine", making this inequality a life or death situation for black Americans.

=== Current discrimination ===
Many argue that giving reparations for slavery is too complicated, but there is a strong basis for them on the past and current discrimination that blacks in America face. Ta-Nehisi Coates explains it in "The Case for Reparations" article in The Atlantic as "ninety years of Jim Crow, sixty years of separate but equal, and thirty-five years of racist housing policy". The legacy of these policies have kept African Americans from opportunities to build wealth, while slavery "enriched white slave owners and their descendants". Today, the district of North Lawndale in Chicago, where redlining was the strongest, is the poorest neighborhood in the city, with an unemployment rate of 18.6% and 42% of residents living below the poverty line.

The discriminatory practices of 1940 through 1970 still reverberate today, as the average White family has roughly ten times the amount of wealth as the average Black family. As Bittker claims in his book The Case for Black Reparations, "as slavery faded into the background, it was succeeded by a caste system embodying white supremacy". Many argue that while reparations may be a first step towards amending the harms caused by slavery, the systemic racism that exists in many institutions will not be fixed as easily. Malcolm X stated: "If you stick a knife in my back nine inches and pull it out six inches, there's no progress. If you pull it all the way out that's not progress. Progress is healing the wound that the blow made."

=== Precedents ===
Advocates have used other examples of reparations to argue that victims of institutional slavery should be similarly compensated.

In several cases the federal government has formally apologized to or compensated minority groups for past actions:

- Under the Civil Liberties Act of 1988, signed into law by President Ronald Reagan, the US government apologized for Japanese American internment during World War II and provided reparations of $20,000 to each survivor, to compensate for loss of property and liberty during that period. No compensation was given to the descendants of affected individuals though.
- The Alaska Native Claims Settlement Act transferred land, federal money, and a portion of oil revenues to native Alaskans.
- The Apology Resolution of 1993 apologized for the overthrow of the Kingdom of Hawaii, but gave no compensation.

US state governments have made reparations in some specific circumstances:

- Virginia established a compensation fund for victims of involuntary sterilization in 2015.

Other countries have also opted to pay reparations for past grievances, such as:

- Reparations for the Holocaust, including the Reparations Agreement between Israel and West Germany and various programs under the Conference on Jewish Material Claims Against Germany.

== Arguments against reparations ==
=== Statute of limitations ===
Most state and federal laws under which parties can sue for damages have a statute of limitations which sets a deadline for filing; these have all long since passed, which prevents courts from granting relief under existing laws. This has been used effectively in several suits, including In re: African American Slave Descendants, which dismissed a high-profile suit against a number of businesses with ties to slavery.

=== Qualification for Reparations ===
It can be difficult to determine who exactly is and isn't an African American, since many people in the United States are interracial in their heritage and genetics, and personal identification plays a role in a person labeling themself as an African American. A 2025 report by the Pew Research Center reports that 5.6 million multi-racial people belonged to the "Black" population in the United States (12% of the black population), and that 3.0 million (6%) were Black-Hispanic. This complicates the enacting of racial reparations, since a policy must be set to determine who qualifies as an African American, and thus who will receive reparations.

There is broad disagreement about whether reparations should be provided in response to all mistreatment of black people in American history, or should focus on slavery, which complicates the process of developing a criteria for who should receive reparations.

==== Descendance Criteria ====
If the criteria is about descendance to an enslaved person, then there is an issue of a person providing documentation, since most slaves and their children & grandchildren did not have birth certificates. Most documentation comes from plantation dockets, which can provide incomplete information, or not survive to the present day. In the United States, birth certificates were not federally standardized until 1902, many babies prior to World War 2 were home-births and thus not recorded, and even then most records provided only rudimentary information. Federally, birth certificates were not a legal requirement until 1942.

Before the federal birth certificate system, many states provided their own birth certificate system. But most states did not begin until the 20th century, which is a few generations after slavery was abolished in 1865. Many of the southern states notorious for slavery did not establish birth certificates until well after 1865, such as Alabama in 1908, Arkansas in 1914, South Carolina in 1915, and Georgia in 1919. This makes it difficult for a person to gather the documents that prove their ancestor was enslaved.

A 2022 task-force in California defined a qualified person as being a descendant of an enslaved person, or of a free black person living before the end of the 19th century. However, The National African American Reparations Commission (NAARC) define a qualified as to include any person of African descent in the United States, regardless of whether they are descended from a slave or what century their ancestor first arrived to the United States.

The American Descendants of Slavery foundation argues that multiple criteria must be met to qualify: being an American citizen with government documentation of being black, have a legally valid record of a direct ancestor being black in the US before 1965, and trace their ancestry to a person identifying as black or was enslaved between 1776 – 1865 in the United States.

==== Racial Criteria ====
If reparations are in response to broader systemic racism (in history or modern times), then the criteria shifts from a person establishing descendance from a slave to establishing that they are 'black', which can be difficult to objectively measure.

From the first census in 1790 to the 1950s there has been multiple ways to classify who is 'black'. Categories throughout history include 'Black' (purely African descendance), 'Mulatto' (half African genetically), 'Quadroon' (1/4th), 'Octoroon' (1/8th), and in certain scenarios any person with any amount of African genetics was considered black (one-drop rule). Terms such as 'Colored' and 'Negro' are subjective labels that have been used in official documents throughout American history. A person with any ancestor documented in these ways is a descendant of a 'black' person, even if they or their family do not identify as African Americans.

There is no consensus on what genetic percentage is the threshold for being 'black' versus not black, or whether being 'black' is a genetic phenomenon or comes from skin color, culture, personal identity, or some combination of these. The exact criteria policymakers use to determine who qualifies can dramatically change who receives reparations, and is bound to be controversial.

=== Technical complications ===
The technical side of reparations is very complex, and could be a reason why they have not yet been implemented. Some argue against the idea of putting a monetary value on the traumas that Black Americans have faced, dubbing it "transactionalism". On the other hand, some dismiss the case for reparations entirely due to practical concerns, such as who would receive these financial payments, why should the current generation pay for wrongs for which they are not responsible, and how much should be paid.

The estimates of the monetary value of stolen slave labor and subsequent discrimination vary "from an outrageously low $3.2 million to $4.7 billion," and to as much as $12 trillion. This also raises the question of who is responsible for paying. Generally, three actors are agreed upon: federal and state governments, who supported and protected the institution of slavery; private companies that benefited from it; and "rich families that owe a good portion of their wealth to slavery".

Some claim that closing the wealth gap involves paying descendants of slaves "individual cash payments in the amount that will close the Black-white racial wealth divide". Another suggestion is for reparations to "come in the form of wealth-building opportunities that address racial disparities in education, housing, and business ownership". For example, in the city of Asheville, North Carolina, reparations have been implemented in the form of "investments in areas where Black residents face disparities". However, the complications that surround this are significant, and others argue that putting the money into communities is not effective, due to people moving and gentrification.

In his book, Bittker lays out some of the practical and constitutional problems that would likely arise in an attempt to execute a program of reparations to Blacks. Would it be the same payment to every person? Would they have to prove ancestry to an African slave, or would it be any black person who was subject to racism? There are no real answers to these questions, as this is an unprecedented case. Other cases of reparations, such as to the Jewish people who survived the Holocaust or the Native Americans in the United States, are very different in the way that it is much easier to identify the group who should receive them, and the reparations were paid more quickly than in the case of reparations for slavery.

=== Additional arguments and opinions ===
Steven Greenhut, the western region director for the R Street Institute, has suggested that reparations would make racism worse.

Republican senator Mitch McConnell of Kentucky, who is a descendant of slave owners, while acknowledging that slavery was an "original sin" of the United States, opposes providing reparations because he believes "none of us currently living are responsible."

One publication against reparations is David Horowitz, Uncivil Wars: The Controversy Over Reparations for Slavery (2002). Other works that discuss problems with reparations include John Torpey's Making Whole What Has Been Smashed: On Reparations Politics (2006), Alfred Brophy's Reparations Pro and Con (2006), and Nahshon Perez's Freedom from Past Injustices (Edinburgh University Press, 2012).

Reparations in the US have never gained widespread public support. A 2017 publication in Political Psychology argues that in these conversations about reparations, the common reactions of White individuals is to claim that they are a form of unjustifiable "reverse racism", or that demands for reparations are an example of the "Black refusal to move beyond the memory of slavery". A 2020 poll from The Washington Post showed that "63% of Americans don't think the US should pay reparations to the descendants of slaves". Notably, 82% of Black Americans support reparations, while 75% of White Americans do not. Some arguments also highlight the complications behind reparations, such as "not all Black Americans are descendants of slaves" or that the people alive today are not responsible for the harms of slavery. Others still argue that reparations will do nothing in the face of racism, and that structural and policy changes would be more effective.

== Reparations and COVID-19 ==
The call for reparations has amplified due to the coronavirus pandemic, with people of color disproportionately likely to be laid off, to struggle financially, and to die from the virus. For example, 40% of black-owned businesses have closed permanently since March 2020 due to the pandemic, compared to 17% of white-owned businesses during the same period. This relates back to the fact that white families have roughly ten times the wealth of black families. This limits black-owned businesses' access to credit and loans, and they do not have the safety net in times of crises that many white-owned businesses do.

In addition, African Americans continue to get infected and die from COVID-19 at rates more than 1.5 times their share of the population. In August 2020, the CDC released data showing that Blacks, Latinos, and American Indians are experiencing hospitalizations at rates 4.5 to 5.5 times higher than non-Hispanic whites, and that African Americans are dying at 2.4 times the white rate.

== Legislation and other actions ==
=== Federal government ===
On July 30, 2008, the United States House of Representatives passed a resolution apologizing for American slavery and subsequent discriminatory laws. The Senate apologized in 2009.

=== States ===
==== Legislation ====
- California – Adopted legislation requiring insurance companies to determine whether they have records going back to when slavery existed in this country and, if so, to provide information on insurance policies held by slaveholders on slaves to the state's insurance department. The California Reparations Task Force was established in 2020 as a non-regulatory state agency to study and develop reparation proposals.
- Illinois – Adopted legislation requiring insurance companies to determine whether they have records going back to when slavery existed in this country and, if so, to provide information on insurance policies held by slaveholders on slaves to the state's insurance department.
- Iowa – Adopted legislation asking the insurance commissioner to request if insurance companies they have records going back to when slavery existed in this country and, if so, to provide information on insurance policies held by slaveholders on slaves to the state's insurance department.
- Maryland – Adopted legislation requiring insurance companies to determine whether they have records going back to when slavery existed in this country and, if so, to provide information on insurance policies held by slaveholders on slaves to the state's insurance department.
- New York – In December 2023, Gov. Kathy Hochul signed a bill setting up a commission for the study of slavery's legacy. The commission will possibly make recommendations for monetary compensation or other reparations for New York's Black residents under the effort. The Democrat-controlled state Legislature approved the measure in June.

==== Apologies ====
- Alabama – Apologized for its involvement in the enslavement of Africans on April 25, 2007.
- Connecticut – In 2009 apologized for its involvement in the enslavement of Africans.
- Delaware – Apologized for its involvement in the enslavement of Africans on February 11, 2016.
- Florida – In 2008, apologized for its involvement in the enslavement of Africans in America.
- Maryland – In 2007, apologized for its involvement in the enslavement of Africans in America.
- New Jersey – In 2007, apologized for its involvement in the enslavement of Africans in America.
- North Carolina – In 2007, apologized for its involvement in the enslavement of Africans in America.
- Tennessee – In 2007, the Tennessee House of Representatives voted in unanimous support on a resolution stating that it "regrets" its involvement in the enslavement of Africans. The House had specifically removed any "apology" language from the resolution.
- Virginia – Apologized for its involvement in the enslavement of Africans on February 26, 2007.

=== Cities ===
- Chicago, Illinois: "In 2015, Chicago enacted a reparations ordinance covering hundreds of African Americans tortured by police from the 1970s to the 1990s. The law calls for $5.5 million in financial compensation, as well as hundreds of thousands more for a public memorial, and a range of assistance related to health, education and emotional well-being."
- Evanston, Illinois: "The City Council of Evanston, Illinois, voted to allocate the first $10 million in tax revenue from the sale of recreational marijuana (which became legal in the state on January 1, 2020) to fund reparations initiatives that address the gaps in wealth and opportunity of black residents."
- Asheville, North Carolina: The city council approved reparations on a 7–0 vote on July 14, 2020. "[B]udgetary and programmatic priorities may include but not be limited to increasing minority home ownership and access to other affordable housing, increasing minority business ownership and career opportunities, strategies to grow equity and generational wealth, closing the gaps in health care, education, employment and pay, neighborhood safety and fairness within criminal justice," the resolution reads. The resolution establishes the Community Reparations Commission which will make concrete recommendations for programs and resources allocations to ultimately carry out the reparations. The Asheville City Council also voted unanimously on June 9, 2020, to remove two confederate monuments as a result of demands made by a group called "Black Asheville Demands" and the work of the Racial Justice Coalition with led the push for the effort. The city council meeting had so much community engagement public comment was extended for an extra hour beyond the normal meeting time.
- San Francisco, California: In March 2023, "reparation payments of $5 million to eligible Black residents [were] unanimously accepted by San Francisco’s Board of Supervisors."

=== Organizations and institutions ===
- Aetna: Apologized in 2000 for issuing life insurance policies to enslavers covering the lives of enslaved people from c. 1853 to 1860. In 2002, when Farmer-Paellman brought suit against Aetna, CSX and Fleet for unjust enrichment by "a system that enslaved, tortured, starved and exploited human beings," this suit was dismissed.
- University of Alabama: Apologized for the history of slavery at the university in 2004.
- Georgetown University: "In 2016 [the university agreed] to give admissions preference to descendants of the 272 slaves[,] formally apologized for its role in slavery [and] [renamed] two buildings on its campus to acknowledge the lives of enslaved people". In April 2019 students at Georgetown University voted to increase their tuition by $27.20 to benefit the descendants of the 272 slaves sold by the Jesuits who ran the school in 1838. The student-led referendum was non-binding. Later that year, after further pressure and follow up from the Georgetown University Student Association, the university eventually moved forward with a similar proposal without the students' covering the cost with a tuition increase.
- Harvard University started to research its relationship to slavery in 2007. In 2016 Harvard president Drew Faust acknowledged that the university had been "directly complicit" in slavery. In 2022 the university published Harvard & the Legacy of Slavery, more than a hundred pages long. The report included recommendations to develop educational partnerships with historically Black colleges and universities, create a public memorial, and identify living descendants of people enslaved by university staff, leaders and faculty. There was a US$100m endowment for implementation. The university has given descendants of slaves preferential consideration for admissions and set up a reconciliation fund for them.
- JP Morgan Chase: Apologized for its connection to slavery in 2005.
- Princeton Theological Seminary: In 2019 the Seminary announced a $27 million commitment for various initiatives to recognize how it benefited from black slavery. This is the largest monetary commitment by an educational institution.
- Virginia Theological Seminary: Set aside $1.7 million to pay reparations to descendants of African Americans who were enslaved to work on their campus, first distributed in 2021.
- Wachovia: Apologized for its connection to slavery in 2005.

== See also ==
- American Descendants of Slavery (ADOS)
- American slave court cases
- Freedom suit – lawsuits brought by slaves to obtain freedom and reparations
- History of slavery in the United States
- History of slavery
- History of slavery in Asia
- History of slavery in the Muslim world
- Legal remedy
- Liberia
- Public apologies for slavery in the United States
- Reparations (website)
- Republic of New Afrika
- Slavery in contemporary Africa
- Slavery reparation scam

== Video ==
- Gannon, James (October 25, 2018). A Moral Debt: The Legacy of Slavery in the USA. Al-Jazeera. "Gannon is a descendant of Robert E. Lee"
