= Holocaust Era Asset Restitution Taskforce =

Holocaust restitution project (2011-2014)

Project HEART
- Holocaust Era Asset Restitution Taskforce
- Formation: 2011; 15 years ago
- Dissolved: 2014; 12 years ago
- Type: Non-profit
- Purpose: To locate Holocaust victims and their heirs and assist in obtaining restitution for property taken during the Holocaust
- Services: Research, Property restitution assistance
- Fields: Holocaust restitution
- Executive Director: Bobby Brown
- Parent organization: Government of Israel, Jewish Agency for Israel
- Funding: Government of Israel

The Holocaust Era Asset Restitution Taskforce or Project HEART (2011-2014) was a Holocaust restitution project that was created by a decision of the Israeli Government to locate Holocaust victims and their heirs and the property that was taken from them during the Holocaust and to assist in obtaining restitution for that property. Restitution would have been sought using databases containing the data submitted by Holocaust victims and their heirs and information about the property that was taken from them. Those who were interested in participating were directed to fill out a questionnaire to determine their eligibility and may also have accessed a website and call center for assistance. Questionnaires had been collected and processed by an administrator and then forwarded to the Israeli Government, which had planned to negotiate with the relevant Governments, companies and others who hold Holocaust assets. This project used innovations, such as the Internet, not used in previous restitution attempts and marked the most serious attempt at obtaining restitution for aged Holocaust victims and their heirs. By April 2014 the project lost 95% of its funding, is accepting no requests, and it has eventually been absorbed into the Israeli Ministry of Senior Citizens, from which the funding into the project were coming.

== Background ==
Previous attempts at restitution include legislation that was passed in Eastern European countries around the time of the fall of Communism that allowed Jews to seek restitution for property lost during the Holocaust, but the resulting compensation was not inclusive of all victims and all properties. There are also organizations that have been devoted to securing restitution for Holocaust survivors and to assisting Holocaust victims in various ways. The Conference on Jewish Material Claims Against Germany Claims Conference, founded in 1951, is one of the best-known institutions that has fought for this cause. And in 1993, the World Jewish Restitution Organization was founded by several Jewish groups including JAFI and the Claims Conference to work with countries and governments and Jewish communities and organizations on negotiations and cooperative agreements and to research and compile information about Jewish communal and public property.

It has long been a well-known issue that Swiss banks refused to disclose the assets of Holocaust victims held by these banks. The World Jewish Congress lawsuit against Swiss banks was launched to retrieve these deposits in 1995.

The issue of the assets of the Holocaust victims in Israel was first raised in 1997 by Prof. Yossi Katz, who published his finding in the article "Forgotten Property. The Fate of the Property of Those Who Perished in the Holocaust in Israel". His efforts in this respect were cited when he was awarded a 2016 Israel Prize.

One of the commitments that formed the basis for HEART's endeavor to seek restitution was the Terezin Declaration passed during the 2009 Holocaust Era Assets Conference in Prague. In this resolution, 46 countries agreed to the principle of compensating Holocaust victims and their heirs for property lost in their respective countries and that restitution should be handled by the governments involved. However, this resolution is morally rather than legally binding.

== Origin of the project and purpose ==
Project HEART was an undertaking of the Government of Israel in cooperation with the Jewish Agency for Israel (JAFI). It was chaired by Rafi Eitan, former senior citizens affairs minister, and its executive director was Bobby Brown of JAFI. Brown has been involved in Holocaust restitution for more than ten years, including when he served as Diaspora affairs advisor during Prime Minister Binyamin Netanyahu's first term.

The project began in late February 2011. It was being funded by the Israeli government, which provided it with more than $2.5 million a year for three years. This was the first time the government of Israel had sponsored a Holocaust restitution project.

Its purpose was to locate Jewish Holocaust victims and their heirs whose personal property was seized by the Nazis and provide them with the means and information to help them seek restitution for the stolen property. Efforts to reach people worldwide included advertising, media exposure, and encouraging Jewish nongovernmental organizations to spread the word to their members and to the Jewish community in general. The program's focus was to gather information with the ultimate goal of restitution. Its first step was to identify people with potential claims for certain types of private property that was confiscated, looted, or forcibly sold in countries governed or occupied by Nazi or Axis forces during the Holocaust. The various types of property that are eligible for restitution include immovable property such as real estate; movable property such as jewelry, tools, or art; or intangible personal property such as stocks, bonds, or savings accounts. However, if Holocaust victims or their heirs had already received restitution for a particular piece of property, then they were no longer eligible for participation in Project HEART.

The project compiled restitution claims but did not handle the restitutions themselves. The latter task has been handled by the New-York based Conference on Material Claims Against Germany (including the negotiations with Austria) since early 1950s.

== Online database ==
A searchable database, ostensibly assembled from European public records, of more than two million pieces of property that belonged to Jews before the beginning of World War II was released on May 1, 2011, made it one of the largest publicly available databases of Jewish property lost during the Holocaust era. It was created to help Holocaust victims and their heirs identify property that may belong to them and includes property addresses, lists of homeowners and professions, lists of known confiscated properties, business directories, insurance policies, and other information. This database and one that contains information collected regarding Holocaust victims and their heirs along with their potential claims would have then been used to seek restitution along with the cooperation of governments and others that have not done so yet. The property database would have been be particularly useful for corroborating and authenticating property claims.

== Participation in the project ==
Participation in Project HEART required filling out a questionnaire, which had been found on the project's website. Providing evidence of property ownership was not required to be eligible. Individuals noted on the questionnaire why they think they owned or are beneficiaries of eligible property. A website and a call center were available in 13 languages, and either one could have been utilized to obtain questionnaires or more information about the program. Individuals may also have accessed the property database on the website for research purposes. Once all questionnaires were processed, restitution information was to be classified as containing complete, incomplete, or no documentation. After that, the information would have been submitted to the government of Israel, which would then begin negotiations for restitution with the governments of countries in which the properties were lost and other relevant bodies. Project HEART insisted that any compensation recovered would have been disbursed directly to Holocaust survivors and their heirs if they can be located.

== Project administrator ==
A.B. Data, Ltd. had been appointed by JAFI and the Israeli government as Project HEART's administrator.

== See also ==
- Aftermath of the Holocaust
- Forced labour under German rule during World War II
- International Commission on Holocaust Era Insurance Claims
- Jewish Agency for Israel
- Reparations Agreement between Israel and West Germany
- World Jewish Congress lawsuit against Swiss banks
- Yad Vashem
