= Cornelius J. Jones =

African-American attorney, activist and politician

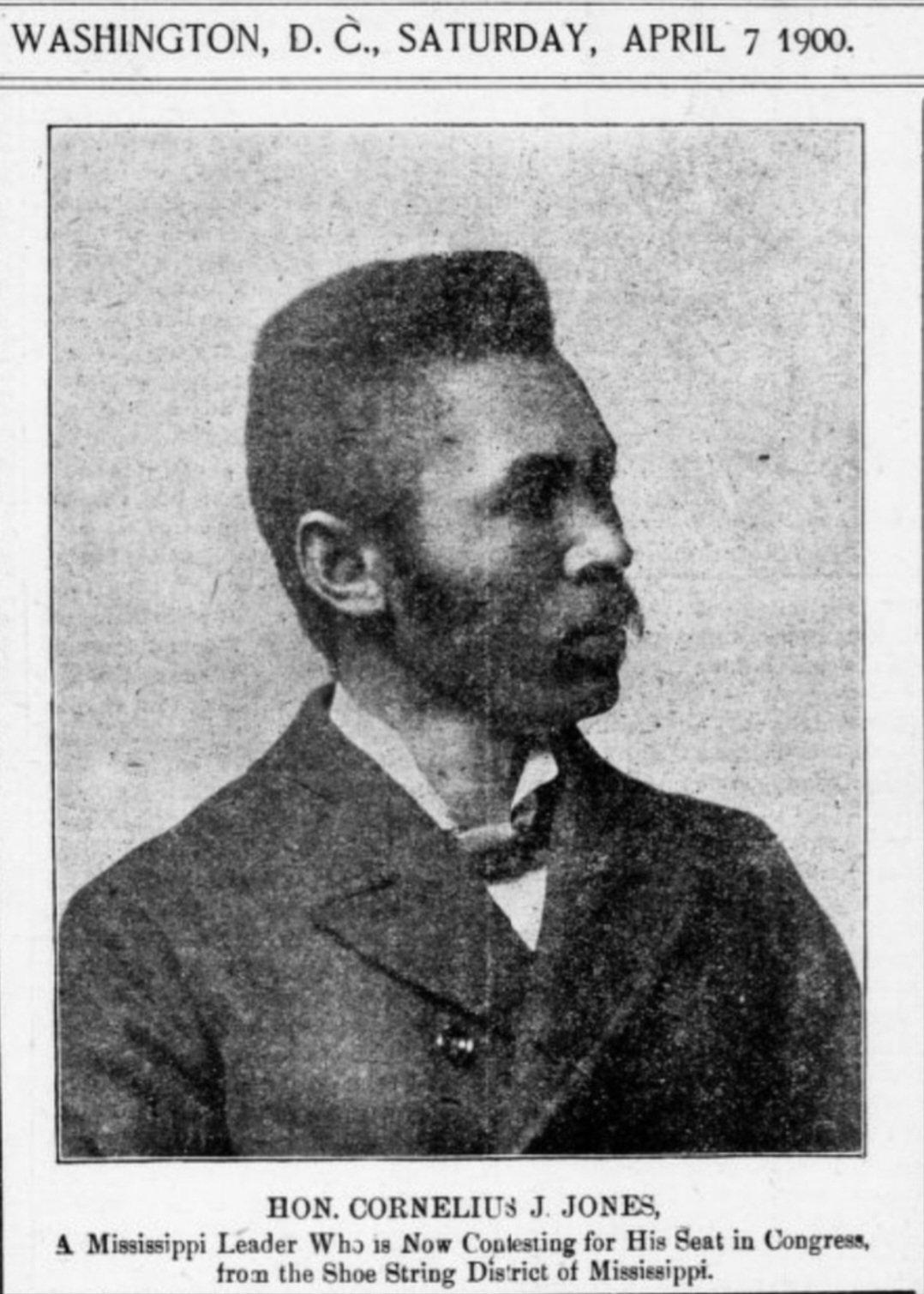
- Born: August 13, 1858; Hinds County, Mississippi, US
- Died: March 13, 1931 (aged 72); Muskogee, Oklahoma, US
- Occupations: American attorney, politician and activist
- Known for: One of the first African-American attorneys to argue before the United States Supreme Court; advocate for remuneration of former slaves by the United States federal government.

Cornelius J. Jones (August 13, 1858 – March 13, 1931) was an African-American attorney, activist and politician who was active in Mississippi, Indian Territory, Oklahoma, and Tennessee between approximately 1880 and 1931. In the 1890s, Jones became one of the first African-American attorneys to argue before the United States Supreme Court. Beginning in 1915, he participated in the movement to reclaim revenue from taxes collected on slave-grown cotton during the Civil War for formerly-enslaved cotton workers and their descendants. Working with the National Ex-Slave Mutual Relief, Bounty and Pension Association (MRB&PA), he sued the United States Treasury Department in 1915, in an attempt to access those funds. He served one term in the Mississippi House of Representatives in 1890 and 1891 as a Republican, and twice ran unsuccessfully for Congress in Mississippi's third district. Jones was also a promoter of Chase, Oklahoma, a short-lived attempt to establish an all-black town outside of Muskogee, Oklahoma.

== Family background, education, and personal life ==
Cornelius J. Jones was born on August 13, 1858, in Hinds County, Mississippi, the youngest surviving child and only surviving son of Cornelius Jones and Hannah Elizabeth Donaldson. He had two older sisters, Celia Ann and Sarah. Jones' mother had been enslaved and he was born into slavery. His father's legal status prior to Emancipation is uncertain. In 1903, Jones applied to the Dawes Commission for membership in the Mississippi Choctaw tribe, testifying that his father was one-half Choctaw and that his paternal great-grandfather, John (or Jack) Jones, had registered as a tribe member in 1830 under the terms of the Treaty of Dancing Rabbit Creek. Jones responded to the commissioners' question of whether either or both of his parents had been slaves by stating that his mother had been enslaved, but did not mention his father. Jones' application was rejected for lack of evidence, because while the commission's researchers identified a John Jones as a member of the Mississippi Choctaw they found no evidence linking Cornelius Jones to that man, and Jones had provided no documentation in support of his claim.

In 1864, Hannah Donaldson and Cornelius Jones Sr. were legally married in Vicksburg, Mississippi, where the family remained after the Civil War. In 1870, when all of the members of the Jones family opened accounts with the Freedman's Bank, Cornelius Jones Sr. owned a farm and Hannah Jones' occupation was recorded as housekeeper.

Jones attended Freedman's Bureau schools and the newly-established Alcorn University (now Alcorn State University) where he was a student from 1872 to 1878. After leaving Alcorn, he worked as a teacher in Louisiana and Mississippi. In 1885, he was a school principal in Mayersville, Mississippi and in 1886 he was one of the organizers of a new school for black children in nearby Lake Providence, Louisiana. In 1880, he began to read law. His tutors included the McLaurin brothers of Brandon, Mississippi, one of whom, Anselm McLaurin, would later serve as governor of Mississippi and as a United States senator. Jones passed the Mississippi bar in 1888.

In 1881, Jones married Betty Julian of Vicksburg. They had two daughters, Gertrude and Quincella, before Betty Jones' death in 1884. During the 1880s and early 1890s, he lived in Issaquena County, Mississippi, first in Mayersville and then in the hamlet of Ben Lomond. After his term in the Mississippi legislature as the delegate from Issaquena County, he moved to Greenville in neighboring Washington County, which became his home base for the next twelve years. During at least some of this time, he shared a home with his mother and daughters in Greenville, while also paying lengthy visits to Washington, DC. In 1903, he moved to Muskogee, Indian Territory (part of Oklahoma from 1906), which would be his home for much of the rest of his life. He also continued to spend time in Washington, DC, and lived in Memphis, Tennessee, from 1915 to 1917 while he was working with the MRB&PA.

Jones was married at least twice after his first wife's death. On September 26, 1893, he married Sarah Elizabeth Disney, a 50-year-old widow from Maryland, at Chatham, Ontario, Canada. In the 1900 United States Census he was recorded as a widower. In his 1903 application for membership in the Mississippi Choctaw tribe, he testified that he was married to his second wife, that her name was Rosa A. Jones, and that she was not Choctaw. In 1919, he married Maggie C. Davis, a widow, in Muskogee. Two years later, Maggie Jones filed for divorce, citing cruelty as the cause. Jones countersued, accusing his wife of refusing to do household chores and stating that she had agreed to "cancel their marriage obligation" in exchange for a payment of $3000.00. In the 1930 U.S. Census, he was recorded as a widower, living in Muskogee with a housekeeper, but a draft obituary in his family papers included an unnamed widow among his survivors.

Jones died in Muskogee on March 16, 1931, aged 72.

== Legal and political career in Mississippi ==
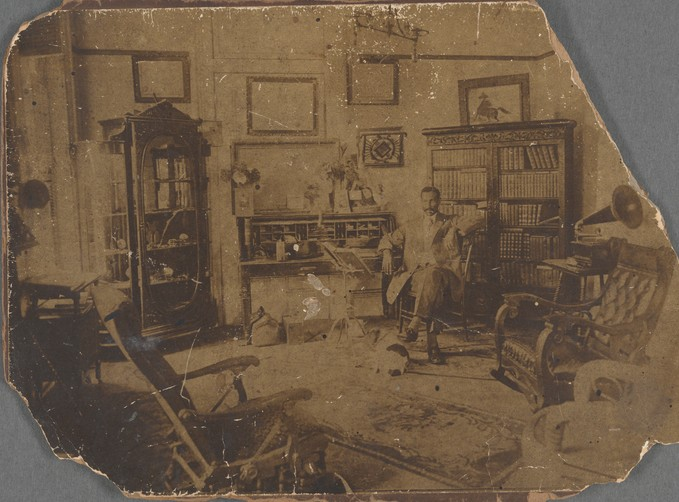
Jones in an office or sitting room, taken during the late nineteenth or early twentieth century.

Jones practiced law in Mississippi from 1888 to 1903. During this period, he appealed three cases to the United States Supreme Court, arguing two and serving as co-counsel in the third. He was politically active during the 1880s and 1890s, participating as a Republican at the local, state, and federal levels. By the mid-1880s, he had become a leader in the Issaquena County Republican Party, serving as a member of its Congressional Executive Committee in 1886 and as secretary of the Republican convention for Mississippi's Third Congressional District in 1888. He won election to the Mississippi state legislature for the 1890 term as the delegate for Issaquena County and ran unsuccessfully for the United States House of Representatives in 1896 and 1898. He challenged the results of both elections, but failed to overturn either one.

Jones' best-known activities during this period were related to the state constitution that Mississippi adopted in 1890. Known as the "Disenfranchisement Constitution," it was designed to prevent black men from voting. Jones opposed the call for a constitutional convention during his term in the legislature. The 1890 constitution ended a fifteen-year period during which some black men, such as Jones, were allowed to hold public office by the white Democratic elites who controlled the political process in Mississippi's black-majority counties through a combination of fraud, violence, intimidation, and acceptance of black Republicans as junior partners in politics. After its adoption the state enacted laws designed to disenfranchise black voters, including a poll tax, selective felony disenfranchisement, voting by written secret ballot, which targeted illiterate voters, and an "understanding clause" that allowed illiterate but otherwise-qualified men to vote if an official accepted their explanation of a passage read from the state constitution. During the 1890s, Jones tried, through his appeals to the United States Supreme Court and election challenges in the House of Representatives, to achieve federal recognition that this electoral system violated the rights of black men under the Fourteenth Amendment of the United States Constitution.

=== Legislative service and the 1890 constitution ===
Jones served as the representative for Issaquena County in the Mississippi House of Representatives for Mississippi's 70th legislative session, which met during January and February 1890. He was one of six Republicans out of the 124 members of the House during that session; the six Republicans were also its only African-American members. Jones was assigned to the House Committee on Immigration and to a joint committee to investigate state officers.

During Jones' term, the legislature debated whether to call a state constitutional convention for later in the year. Jones spoke against the convention on January 23, 1890. His argument was that a new constitution was not needed to ensure the political dominance of white Mississippians, because they already had it under the current system. He also claimed that the pro-constitution party's plan to enact a literacy requirement for voters would prevent whites as well as blacks in the "more illiterate classes" from voting, and had the potential to lead to civic unrest. The bill authorizing the convention passed the house by a vote of 62 in favor, 41 against, with Jones voting against it.

In July 1890, Jones was nominated by a convention of black Republicans in Issaquena County to run for delegate to the upcoming constitutional convention, but his candidacy was opposed by the county's Republican establishment. The delegate position ultimately went to the Democratic candidate.

=== United States Supreme Court cases ===
Between 1896 and 1898, Jones appealed three cases to the United States Supreme Court: Gibson v. Mississippi (162 U.S. 565 (1896)), Charley Smith v. Mississippi (162 U.S. 592 (1896)), and Williams v. Mississippi (170 U.S. 213 (1898)). All three appeals directly challenged Mississippi's use of whites-only juries as a violation of his black clients' constitutional right to a jury of their peers. Due to Mississippi's requirement that jurors be selected from county voter rolls, enacted as part of the 1890 constitution, these cases also attacked the portions of the constitution that had been designed to disenfranchise black men.

In 1900, Jones sought leave to file a fourth case, Bell v. Mississippi (177 U.S. 693 (1900)), under the original jurisdiction of the Supreme Court. Fred Bell was a Mississippi man who had been sentenced to five years' imprisonment for larceny in 1879 but was not released until 1897 after eighteen years in prison. Jones sought on Bell's behalf to sue the state for damages as relief for his thirteen years of false imprisonment. The Court denied Jones' motion on the grounds that Hans v. Louisiana (134 U.S. 1 (1890)), a case which determined that the Eleventh Amendment protects the states from being sued in federal court without their consent, also applied to the Supreme Court.

==== Gibson v. Mississippi and Smith v. Mississippi ====
In these two cases, which were appealed together to the Supreme Court, the defendants were black men convicted of murder and sentenced to death. Historian R. Volney Riser notes that Jones' ultimate goal was to have the cases sent to a U.S. district court for trial, explaining, "that might seem anticlimactic, but it would have meant that southern judges, sheriffs, and voting registrars would find themselves standing before federal district judges to justify their administration of jury selection and voter registration. In the immediate short term, there would almost surely be some benefit for disenfranchised African Americans."

===== Background =====
Charley Smith was accused of murdering Wiley Nesby, another black man, during a fight with a third man at a country dance in Bolivar County, Mississippi. Although Smith denied everything, witnesses blamed him for starting the fight and firing the shots that killed Nesby. As his attorney, Jones attempted to quash the indictment against him, on the grounds that the grand jurors who brought the indictment were not impartial, that the members of the all-white grand jury had been selected because of their race, a violation of Smith's constitutional rights, and that the grand jury had not been duly elected and legally empaneled as required by the state and federal constitutions. After this tactic failed, Jones petitioned to have Smith's case moved to the United States circuit court, again challenging the composition of the grand jury and arguing that Smith's rights under the Fourteenth Amendment had been violated. After this petition was denied, and Smith had been tried and convicted, Jones moved for a new trial. When that motion was denied, he appealed to the Mississippi supreme court using a writ of error, a request for reconsideration of the case due to an error of law. During the 1890s, the United States Supreme Court was required to hear writs of error in cases where a state court had denied a defendant's claim of a federal constitutional right. Because the state courts had denied Jones' earlier requests to move Smith's case to federal circuit court, Jones was able to petition for a writ of error to the United States Supreme Court in June 1895, which was granted.

John Gibson was accused of murdering Robert Stinson, the white manager of the plantation in Washington County, Mississippi, where he worked. Gibson had confronted Stinson over an erroneous deduction from his paycheck. Stinson, who was armed, knocked Gibson to his knees and fired at him. During the ensuing struggle an additional shot killed Stinson. Jones joined this case after Gibson had been tried three times. The Mississippi Supreme Court reversed his first conviction, while the second trial ended in a hung jury. After Gibson was convicted in the third trial, Jones appealed to the Mississippi Supreme Court for another new trial, which was granted due to procedural errors by the third trial court. Jones was not directly involved in Gibson's fourth trial, but Gibson's attorney used the same strategy that Jones had used in Smith's case, seeking to quash the case and have it moved to federal court. Jones returned after Gibson was again convicted, appealing the case to the Mississippi Supreme Court along with Smith's, and then to the United States Supreme Court.

===== Supreme Court arguments and decisions =====
For the Supreme Court cases, Jones worked with Emanuel Molyneaux Hewlett, a black attorney and Justice of the Peace in the District of Columbia. Hewlett, a member of the Supreme Court bar, was able to add the cases to the docket in August 1895, before Jones' admittance to the bar on Hewlett's recommendation in October. Both attorneys signed the briefs for both cases, with Jones presenting Smith before the court and Hewlett presenting Gibson in December 1895.

For Gibson, Jones and Hewlett made two arguments. They argued that the administration of jury selection in Washington County had violated Gibson's rights under the Equal Protection Clause of the Fourteenth Amendment because, even after the passage of the 1890 Mississippi constitution, there were 7000 blacks and 1400 whites on the county voter rolls but no black men were ever called to serve on juries. They argued that the exclusion must have been intentional, and that the trial court should have accepted Jones' motion to remove the case to federal court under the rules established in Federal Revised Statutes §641, authorizing removal for cases where a defendant was denied or could not enforce their rights under federal law in a state court. Secondly, they argued that because the murder for which Gibson had been convicted took place before laws to implement the 1890 constitution were enacted, and the constitution stipulated that in that situation the old laws still applied, Gibson's jury should have been selected from a pool assembled under the broader, pre-1890 eligibility requirements. They asserted that Gibson therefore had a federal case under the Ex Post Facto Clause of the United States Constitution. For Smith, they again argued that the absence of blacks from the pool from which the jury was selected, despite the presence of 1,500 blacks vs. 500 whites on the Bolivar County voter rolls, was an unconstitutional exclusion of black jurors and a violation of Smith's civil rights.

The Supreme Court unanimously rejected all of their arguments. They dismissed the ex post facto claim from Gibson by holding that the requirements in the 1890 constitution had become law as soon as the constitution was enacted and were, regardless, a procedural issue to which the Ex Post Facto Clause did not apply. They rejected the discrimination claims on the grounds that Jones and Hewlett had not provided evidence other than affidavits from the defendants, whereas the court required concrete proof of discrimination. Under the precedent set by cases including Virginia v. Rives (100 U.S. 313 (1880)), legal historian Christopher Waldrep explains, "federal courts could intervene when states seated whites-only juries, but only if state authorities confessed their prejudice and the highest state court endorsed the discrimination." The absence of blacks from juries was not considered in itself sufficient to establish discriminatory intent. Jones had sought to subpoena local officials on this issue during Smith's trial and been refused, but the court did not take that disability into account in its ruling on the case. Jones and Hewlett petitioned for a rehearing, but it was denied.

==== Williams v. Mississippi ====
Williams v. Mississippi was one of a second pair of murder cases with black defendants that Jones initially argued in Mississippi in 1896. Henry Williams was accused of the murder of his girlfriend Eliza Brown after her body was found in her home. He confessed to the crime, but later claimed that he had confessed after having been given alcohol. In the companion case, John Henry Dixon attempted to murder his former fiancee but killed her aunt instead. His only defense was that the murder was a crime of passion. Jones employed the tactics he had used in the Gibson and Smith cases: attempting to quash the indictments, petition to move the cases to a federal court, and, after an initial conviction, appeal to the Mississippi Supreme Court. The state supreme court ruled against Dixon and Williams in November 1896, referring to the federal Gibson and Smith decisions in its determination that the appeal and Jones' cases showed no evidence of the defendants' not having received fair trials. On December 10, 1897, Jones appealed Williams' case to the United States Supreme Court.

Jones argued that the Supreme Court should overturn Williams' conviction because Mississippi's 1890 constitution was designed to be racially discriminatory, and was therefore invalid under the Fourteenth Amendment and the terms of Mississippi's readmission to the Union after the Civil War. The statutes that governed jury selection in Mississippi were therefore, he argued, also unconstitutional. As evidence, Jones cited the Mississippi Supreme Court's ruling in Ratliff v. Beale (74 Miss. 247, 20 So. 865), a case that had been decided on November 30, 1896. In the Ratliff ruling, which found that liens could not be placed on the nontaxable property of people who did not pay their state poll tax, the Mississippi court directly referred to the discriminatory goals of the constitution's framers, determining that because the use of liens for nonpayment would result in more black men paying the tax and becoming eligible to vote, the use was not permitted because that outcome was contrary to the framers' purpose. The ruling explicitly stated that the constitutional convention in 1890, prevented by the Fourteenth Amendment from discriminating against African Americans as a specific racial group, had purposefully "discriminated against its characteristics and the offenses to which its weaker members were prone."

This argument was rejected by the Supreme Court, which unanimously ruled against Jones. The Williams opinion cited Ratliff, but did so in order to determine that so long as a law on its face was race-neutral, framing the law to target characteristics thought to be associated with blacks as a racial group was permissible because the law would also impact whites with those characteristics. The ruling declared that the court was not concerned with the purpose of the law, unless that purpose was executed by the law's administrators. As in the Gibson and Smith cases, the court did not accept affidavits documenting the absence of black jurors as evidence than an act of intentional discrimination had occurred. Jones filed a petition for a rehearing, in which he asserted that the facts of discrimination had been admitted by the lower court, but the petition was not accepted.

==== Assessments of Jones' strategy ====
Historian R. Volney Riser explains that with these cases, Jones "was the only man in Mississippi who was actually doing something concrete to reverse, or just slow, blacks' disenfranchisement" in the state during this period. However, Riser is critical of Jones' work on all three cases and especially in Williams, noting that Jones offered "no exhibits and no data to support his motions and pleas," instead relying solely on affidavits from himself, Williams, and John Henry Dixon. Riser argues that while reliance on affidavits to establish facts was acceptable in Mississippi courts, Jones should have thought of the potential requirements of federal courts should he succeed in moving his case to that venue, particularly after the court's rulings in Smith and Gibson. Conversely, attorney James A. Feldman argues that "what Jones intended to do in Williams seems to have been to offer the court an intent-based criterion for determining an equal protection violation," which it did not accept, although twentieth-century Supreme Court justices would do so in civil rights cases. He concludes that "perhaps the real point of Gibson, Smith, and Williams is that no strategy could have been successful in convincing the Court to make a serious attempt to roll back the Jim Crow regime in the 1890s."

==== Status as an African-American pioneer ====
With the Smith and Gibson cases, Jones and Hewlett collectively became the second African-American attorneys to present cases before the United States Supreme Court. They were preceded by Everett J. Waring, who argued the case of Jones v. United States (137 U.S. 202 (1890)) in 1890 and is the first African American known to have presented an argument before the Supreme Court. Jones' appearances in Smith, Gibson, and Williams all preceded Carter v. Texas (177 U.S. 442 (1900)), a case from 1900 in which Wilford H. Smith became the fourth black attorney to argue before the Supreme Court and the first, along with his co-counsel Hewlett, to win a case.

=== Election challenges ===
Jones ran for the United States House of Representatives in Mississippi's Third Congressional District, then including his home of Greenville as a Republican in 1896 and 1898. He lost both elections to the incumbent, Democrat Thomas C. Catchings, and unsuccessfully contested them in the United States House of Representatives.

==== 1896 election ====
Jones came in third of four candidates in the 1896 election: Catchings received 3096 votes, free-silver candidate J. R. Chalmers 532, Jones 369, and Thomas Easterling, the candidate of a rival Republican faction, 80. In his challenge, Jones argued that he had been denied victory through unfair, inconsistent application of Mississippi's election laws by local officials, and that the sections of Mississippi's constitution and statutes that implemented the understanding clause were void. In these proceedings, the contester (Jones) and contestee (Catchings) filed briefs and deposed and cross-examined witnesses to establish the facts prior to hearings in the House Committee on Elections. Jones' brief and the testimony offered by his depositions illustrated a range of tactics used to prevent qualified black men from voting, including misuse of the understanding clause, refusal to accept voter registrations, refusal to hear appeals of denied registrations, and leaving registered black voters' names out of the poll books that were sent to election workers. He also submitted petitions signed by 5,043 residents of the district, attesting that they had been denied the right to vote but would have voted for Jones. In his response, Catchings focused on the idea that most removals of voters from the rolls were for nonpayment of poll taxes, and argued that black Mississippians were less likely to pay the tax because they were uninterested in politics.

The Committee on Elections held hearings on the case, but no record exists of their having submitted a report to the full House of Representatives. With no action from Congress, the results of the elections stood, leaving Catchings as the victor.

==== 1898 election ====
In 1898, Jones again lost to Catchings, this time by a vote of 2068 to 363 with a third-party candidate receiving 45 votes. Jones' challenge focused on irregularities in the administration of the election. In the November 1898 election, the Mississippi Secretary of State's office had instructed election officials to provide a separate ballot for voting on a constitutional amendment, which contradicted state law requiring that in a given election, votes on constitutional amendments and races for elected offices had to be presented to the voters on a single ballot. The law also stipulated that ballots that were not provided in accordance with the law could not be counted. Jones argued that votes made using the state-provided ballots should therefore be thrown out as invalid, leaving a set of declarations of intent made by voters and collected by the Third District's Republican committee as the only valid expression of the voters' will.

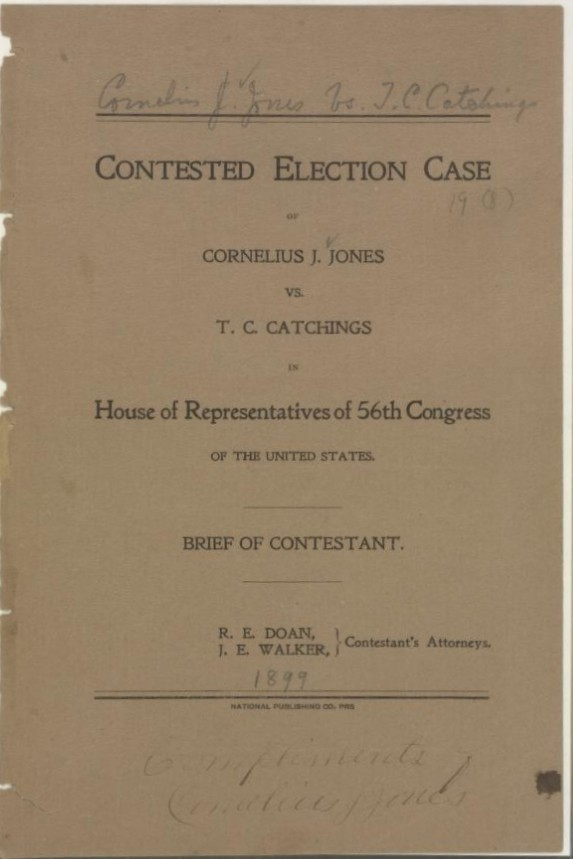
A presentation copy of Jones' brief from his challenge of his 1898 electoral defeat in Mississippi's third congressional district.

In his brief to the House Committee on Elections, Jones explained that when the Republican committee in the Third District had learned of the nonconforming ballots hours before the election, they had concluded that this was "intended to in some way defeat the will of the party at the polls." As insurance, some Republican voters had submitted signed declarations that they intended to vote for Jones, but had been prevented from doing so by the lack of ballots that met constitutional requirements. Jones argued that the 1172 declarations of intent that had been collected by the Republican party were the only valid votes in the election, making him the winner.

Jones' brief alluded to the dangerous political environment for blacks in Mississippi while discussing why more people had not signed the declarations of intent. It explained that the plan was carried out in only a few precincts that were considered safe, and that the plan could not be publicized "because it was reasonably feared that there might be some excuse for political violence." Responding to Catchings' arguments, the brief stated: "It is true, contestee [Catchings] had a number of his witnesses to swear that there exists the most friendly feeling between the two races; yet, it is a matter of current history that this pretended friendliness between the races on political occasions, such as that of last November, could be broken at any moment, when the Democrats thought that such was necessary to make absolutely their success."

The House Committee on Elections again failed to act on Jones' challenge, leaving Catchings as the victor.

== Activities in Indian Territory and Oklahoma ==
Jones established a law practice in Muskogee beginning in 1903. He participated in local politics and the fight to establish Oklahoma statehood, where he was active in the campaign by black Oklahomans to prevent the establishment of a Jim Crow legal system. He ran unsuccessfully to serve as a delegate to Oklahoma's 1906 constitutional convention, was a delegate to the Oklahoma Republican convention in 1908, and ran unsuccessfully for the Republican nomination to serve as Muskogee police judge in 1909. He also participated in the movement to establish all-black towns in Oklahoma and Indian Territory.

=== Oklahoma statehood and Jim Crow ===
Jones was an organizer of the Suffrage League of Indian Territory, an anti-Jim Crow organization of black Republicans. He presided over its first convention in Muskogee in August 1904, and was elected vice chairman for the Creek Nation, in which Muskogee was located. The Suffrage League, which included participants from both Oklahoma Territory and Indian Territory, worked to promote single statehood, combining both territories. It advocated for a framework for Oklahoma statehood that would ensure equal voting rights for all men, "regardless of race, color, or previous condition of servitude." Jones sent the League's proposals to the chairman of the Committee on Territories in the U.S. Senate, Senator Albert Beveridge (R-Indiana), and the committee adopted the League's proposal not to include a provision in the statehood bill that authorized literacy tests for voting. Attorney James A. Feldman notes that the bill did not prevent other "facially race-neutral voting restrictions, such as those Mississippi had adopted in 1890," and allowed the future state to provide segregated schools.

In October 1906, after the passage of the federal Enabling Act for Oklahoma statehood, Jones ran to represent the 76th delegate district in Muskogee at the constitutional convention. The black and white Republicans in the district held rival conventions, the black group nominating Jones and the white group nominating George Bucher. After the canvassing board overseeing delegate selection recognized Bucher as the Republican candidate, Jones ran as an independent in a three-way race against Bucher and Democrat Charles N. Haskell. Bucher withdrew from the race just before the election, and Haskell was the victor. Jones contested the election, on the grounds that black men had been prevented from voting by the election judges. He asked that some of Haskell's votes be set aside and his own total increased to capture the intent of the supporters who, he alleged, had not been allowed to vote. The canvassing board referred the case to the convention, which seated Haskell.

The first bill passed by the Oklahoma legislature after statehood was achieved in 1907 was a Jim Crow law, the Separate Coach Bill (Senate Bill 1) segregating public transportation, which was fought by black legal and political leaders in the state. Jones did not participate in this campaign, believing that there was no path to placing the law before the federal courts as he had attempted to do in Mississippi so long as the railroads provided "separate but equal" accommodation as the law directed them to do.

=== All-black towns movement ===
Jones promoted and supported all-black towns, a movement that developed in Indian Territory and Oklahoma during the late nineteenth and early twentieth centuries and ultimately included more than fifty communities built by Native American Freedmen and African American migrants from other parts of the United States. He attempted to establish the town of Chase, near Muskogee, as an all-black town during 1906 and 1907. In 1907, he also contributed to a fund-raiser supporting the Halochee Industrial Institute, a trade school for black students that was located in Taft, an all-black town about 10 miles west of Muskogee.

==== Town of Chase and Interstate Commerce Commission (ICC) complaint ====
In February 1906, Jones purchased 400 acres of land, including the town site of Chase, from Creek freedmen William and Hannah James for $4000.00. The site was located about eight miles from Muskogee on the route of the St. Louis and San Francisco ("Frisco") railroad, which had established a depot in 1903 and obtained the right to establish a town site in 1904. Chase served as a crossroads and depot for the surrounding farms, the town itself consisting of four families, three stores, a post office, two churches, and separate schools for black and white students. Jones envisioned it becoming an all-black town and a center of African American education in the region, approaching the African Methodist Episcopal (AME) church to establish an industrial school at Chase.

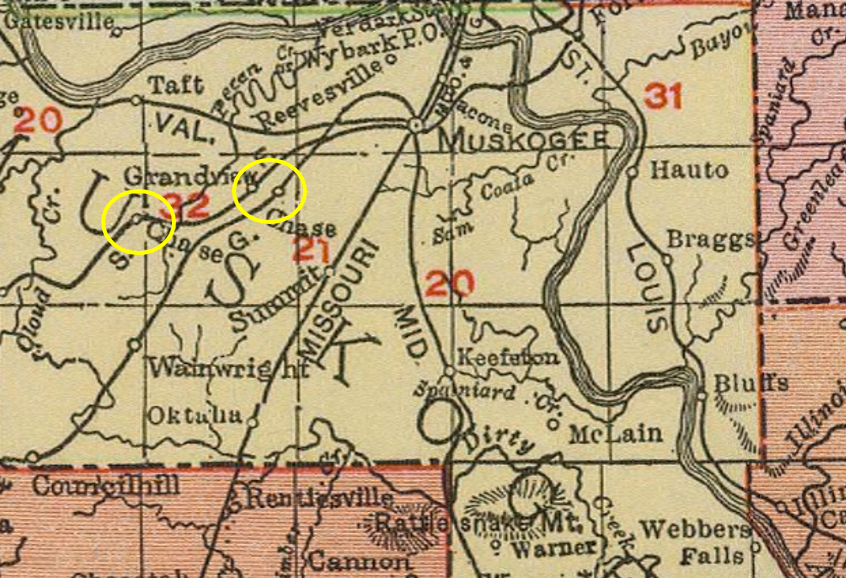
A 1907 railroad map of a portion of Muskogee County, OK, showing Cornelius Jones' town site of Chase (left) and the alternate site at Chase/Grandview (right) to which the Frisco railroad relocated its Chase station in 1905.

Jones advertised town lots for sale in promotional materials that emphasized the town's convenient access to the railroad. However, in the fall of 1905, the Frisco had moved its passenger service from Chase to another site closer to Muskogee that it also called Chase, although the local post office was called Grandview. At this site, its tracks ran so close to those of the Missouri, Oklahoma and Gulf railroad that the two railroads could share a depot. In April 1907, Jones filed a complaint with the Interstate Commerce Commission (ICC) on behalf of himself and the Jameses, requesting that the Frisco be required to restore passenger service to old Chase and to repay them for costs including their promotion of the town site and a contract with the AME church for the proposed school.

The ICC ruled against them, determining both that it had no authority to require a railroad to provide a station at any given point along its line, and that the relocation of the Frisco's Chase station had not damaged the public interest, since the neighborhood farmers could reach the new station as easily as the old one. With no railroad station, Jones was not successful in establishing an all-black town at Chase. In July 1908, the Chase post office moved to the neighboring town of Beland, and by 1936 the settlement had disappeared.

== Work with cotton tax revenue movement ==
From 1915 until the end of his professional life Jones was part of the movement to obtain financial compensation from the federal government for formerly enslaved people. In 1915, he became chief counsel for the National Ex-Slave Mutual Relief, Bounty and Pension Association of the United States (MRB&PA), which had been attempting since the turn of the twentieth century to obtain federal pensions for former slaves, analogous to those provided to Union army veterans. Jones worked with Callie House, general promoter of the MRB&PA, to target a pool of $68 million in federal tax revenue that had been collected on cotton confiscated from the former Confederacy between 1862 and 1868. In Johnson v. McAdoo (45 App. D.C. 440), a case now considered to be the "first documented federal litigation for reparations for slavery," he attempted to legally claim these funds for former slaves. This case and his public advocacy for the cotton revenue claim made him a target for harassment by the federal government, which indicted him for mail fraud in 1916 and 1917. Jones continued to participate in the cotton revenue movement during the 1920s.

=== Johnson v. McAdoo ===
In Johnson v. McAdoo, Jones and the MRB&PA sued to claim funds that had been collected by the federal government between 1862 and 1868 as a tax on Confederate-grown cotton confiscated by federal troops. The tax rate was originally set at 2.5¢ per pound, later raised to 3¢ per pound, raising a sum of more than $68 million, estimated by MeasuringWorth.com as equivalent in 2024 dollars to between $1.3 billion and $240 billion depending on the comparison method employed. Under the Supreme Court's 1895 decision in Pollock v. Farmer's Loan and Trust Co. (157 U.S. 429 (1895)), which determined that income taxes were unconstitutional because they were nonproportional direct taxes, there was a strong argument that the cotton tax had also been unconstitutional. During the 1900s and 1910s there had been calls to apportion the funds among the southern states, to refund them to the original taxpayers, and to use them to provide pensions or care for aged Confederate veterans. Jones and House now claimed them on behalf of the former slaves who had grown the cotton.

Before filing his case, Jones confirmed that the funds were in the possession of the United States Treasury Department and could be disposed of by Congress. He then filed a class-action lawsuit in the District of Columbia, claiming $68,073,388.99 as a specific debt owed to former slaves and their descendants for the production of that cotton under slavery. Jones' suit, originally filed July 13, 1915 and amended on October 26, 1915, used an equitable lien theory of recovery to claim that the funds represented a debt owed to the class members for their uncompensated forced labor during slavery. The plaintiffs, he argued, had been unable to exercise their rights while they were enslaved, but that did not eliminate those rights. He argued that the federal government was only the custodian of the funds, analogously to the way that Native American monies were held in trust; that the tax had been collected illegally; and that the proceeds were owed to the former slaves because slavery was illegal at the time the tax was collected. Jones asked the court to hold that the plaintiffs were entitled to an equitable lien—the right "to have a demand satisfied out of a particular fund or specific property without having possession of the funds or property"—on the $68 million.

Jones constructed the case so that the plaintiffs were not directly suing the United States government, which was likely to lead to dismissal under the doctrine of sovereign immunity. His equitable lien approach argued that the government had no direct interest in the case because the money had always belonged to the plaintiffs. He also avoided framing the case as a "reparations claim or a civil rights claim" by former slaves, recognizing that strategy as unlikely to persuade the courts. He precisely defined the class of potential beneficiaries. The four named plaintiffs, H. N. Johnson, C. B. Williams, Rebecca Bowers, and Minnie Thompson, were all former slaves. When he publicized the case among black Americans, he specified that only those who had personally been involved in cotton production or their descendants were eligible to join the class. He explicitly excluded those who had been enslaved outside of cotton regions and those who had been enslaved in cotton-growing areas but had done other work during slavery.

The federal government responded to the suit by claiming that sovereign immunity did apply and, earlier assurances notwithstanding, that the money did not exist as a separate fund within the treasury. The DC district court dismissed the case on December 10, 1915, finding that Treasury Secretary William G. McAdoo was a custodian of the funds while the actual defendant was the United States government, bringing the case under the doctrine of sovereign immunity. This decision was upheld on appeal on November 16, 1916. Jones then appealed to the United States Supreme Court, but the appeal was rejected on May 17, 1917.

=== Mail fraud charges ===
On November 20, 1915, Jones was arrested in Memphis, Tennessee, on a federal charge of mail fraud. On May 26, 1916 he was indicted by a grand jury, and on September 26, 1916, he was arrested a second time based on the indictment. The charge stemmed from his having raised money from potential beneficiaries of the Johnson v. McAdoo case, by sending fundraising letters asking each person who joined the class to make a one-time contribution of $1.75 to support the work of the case. Jones was accused of defrauding the contributors.

Attorney James A. Feldman characterizes the case as a weak one, because there was no evidence that Jones had committed fraud. He had promised a benefit to the class members only if the case succeeded, and, as it was still working its way through the courts when Jones was charged, it was not yet clear whether any benefit would be forthcoming. On January 17, 1917, the prosecution dropped the charges. The Memphis Commercial Appeal's court reporter speculated that it did so because the judge appeared to believe that the case should have been deferred until after the Supreme Court released its decision in Johnson v. McAdoo.

Jones was indicted a second time for mail fraud on December 10, 1917, after Johnson v. McAdoo had concluded, and was tried on December 2 and 3, 1918. The jury found him guilty, but the judge set the verdict aside due to insufficient evidence. Although the government threatened to prosecute Jones further, no additional charges were brought.

Historian Mary Frances Berry and judge and law professor John G. Browning link the prosecution of Jones to a pattern of harassment directed against the MRB&PA by federal officials during the early twentieth century. The association and its officers were repeatedly accused of fraudulent activities such as raising funds under false pretenses and mail fraud, as a result of their routine communication with members. In September 1917, Callie House of the MRB&PA was convicted of mail fraud and served eleven months of her one-year sentence. Berry argues that Jones' status as a prominent, well-connected attorney and former legislator protected him from similar consequences, because nationally-recognized black leaders like Hewlett and Washington Bee newspaper editor Calvin Chase publicly supported him and testified on his behalf, while House and the MRB&PA, whose work was frowned upon by this group of black leaders, did not have access to similar support.

=== Civil War Revenue Cotton Tax Claimants organization ===
Jones promoted and advocated for the cotton revenue movement as chief counsel of the Civil War Revenue Cotton Tax Claimants (or Civil War Revenue Cotton Tax Claimants of the South), both during and after Johnson v. McAdoo. Jones convened its first convention, held in Canton, Mississippi in September 1916, to verify the class members for the case. Later conventions were held in Muskogee in 1917, and 1919, and in Vicksburg, Mississippi, in 1922.

During the 1920s, he maintained offices for the organization in Washington, DC, and Muskogee, and continued to advocate for the cotton-tax claimants. In 1919, he filed a memorial on their behalf with the House of Representatives, seeking the ability to try their case in the Court of Claims, and in 1920, he lobbied in support of a bill that would have permitted them to sue. In 1929, when the House Ways and Means Committee held hearings on a bill allowing individual states to sue the federal government for refunds of taxes paid on commodities during the 1860s, Jones filed a brief on behalf of the cotton-tax claimants, arguing that they and their heirs, not the states, should be allowed to do so.

== See also ==
- African American officeholders from the end of the Civil War until before 1900
