= Yossi Katz (geographer) =

Israeli expert in historical geography

- יוסי כץ
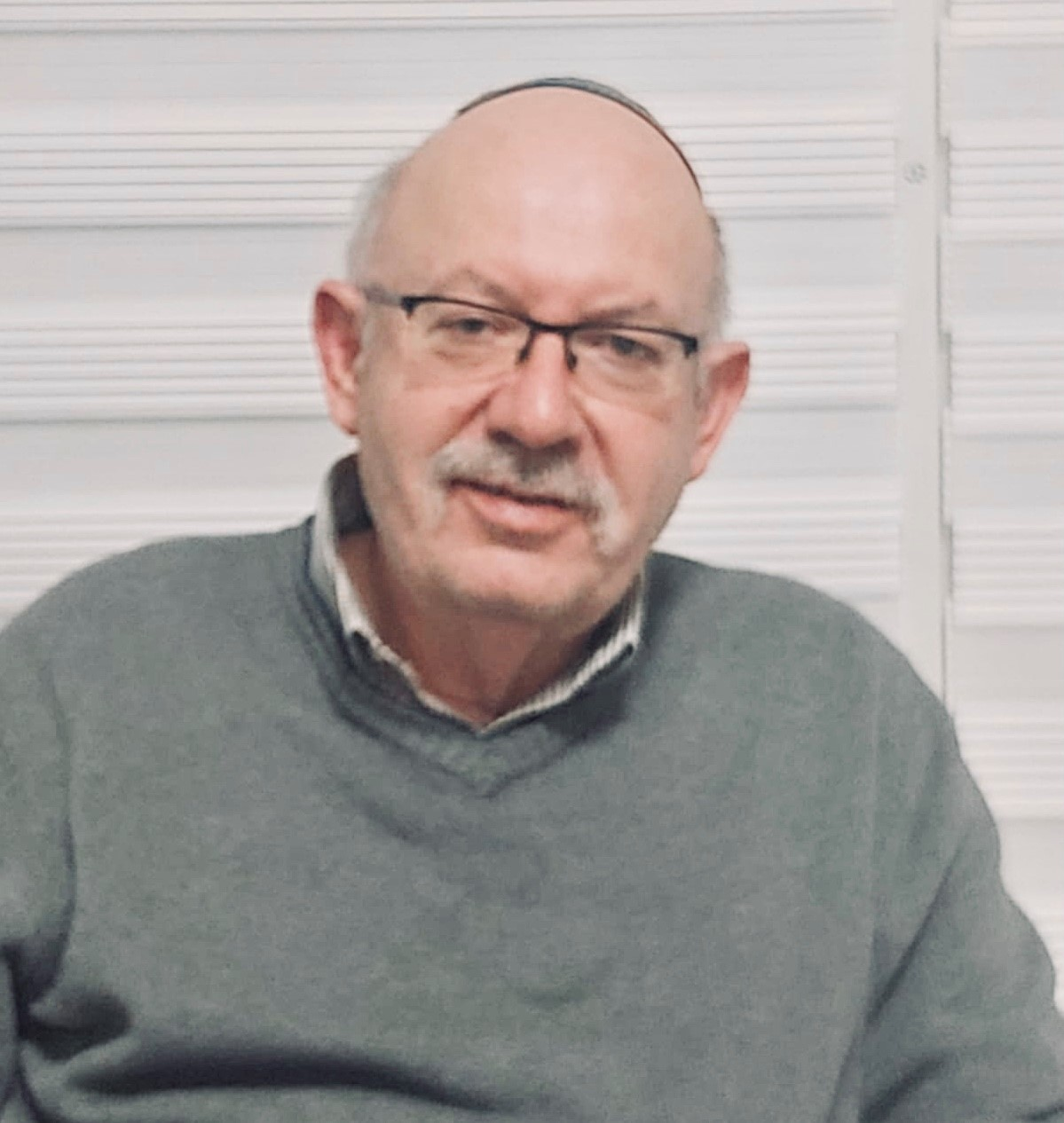
- Born: 2 June 1953 (age 73)
- Education: Hebrew University of Jerusalem
- Occupation: Historical geography
- Awards: Israel Prize (2016)
- Scientific career
- Workplaces: Bar-Ilan University

Yossi Katz (Hebrew: יוסי כץ; born June 2, 1953) is professor emeritus at the Bar-Ilan University, an expert in historical geography. His main research interests include Jewish settlement in towns and villages in the new era, economic, political and cultural aspects of the history of Palestine and Israel, including land laws, kibbutzim, social justice and communal settlements in Israel and Canada. He received the Israel Prize in geography, archaeology, and the study of the Land of Israel for the year 2016.

== Academic career ==
Katz began his academic career with a bachelor's degree in geography and education at the Hebrew University of Jerusalem. He then pursued a master's degree and a Ph.D. in geography at the same institution, completing his doctoral dissertation in 1983.

As of 2021, Yossi Katz is chair for the Study of the History and Activities of the Jewish National Fund and Chair of University Publishing, Bar-Ilan. He was also professor at the Department of Geography (later Department of Geography and Environment).

=== Holocaust survivor assets ===
While doing research on the Jewish National Fund (which was charged with buying and developing land in Ottoman Palestine (later the British Mandate for Palestine), Katz accidentally run into the issue of the Holocaust survivor assets held in Israel. His 1997 article on the subject, "Forgotten Property. The Fate of the Property of Those Who Perished in the Holocaust in Israel" (in Hebrew) exposes that Israeli banks, the Administrator General and various land-dealing organizations held much property arisen from the investments of the European Jews in Israel during 1920s and 1930s. The article triggered political actions and was instrumental in establishing a Parliamentary Investigative Committee on the issue, and Yossi Katz was appointed a consultant by the Knesset to deal with the issue starting in 2000. The same year Katz expanded his article into the book (in Hebrew) Rechush Shenishkach [Forgotten Property]. Katz wrote that much property (land, houses, shares, securities, etc.) in Mandate Palestine were purchased by European Jews, many of whom perished in the Holocaust. Since a considerable number of these Jews were citizens of Germany and other "enemy states", their properties were seized by British Custodian of Enemy Property in 1939. But some of it remained in other hands. Later the British Custodian transferred the seized assets to the corresponding Israel Custodian, who treated them in the same way, as "enemy property". They were further transferred to Administrator General. According to Israeli lawyer Mordechai Tzivin, under the British Law, Rabbanut formally became the apotropos (legal custodian) of some of these properties, but as Katz demonstrated, Rabbanut failed in this respect.

In 2016, Katz was awarded the Israel Prize for his significant contributions to the fields of geography, archaeology, and the study of the Land of Israel. The selection committee stated that his research has "direct and significant implications for national ownership, land tenure in Israel, and the property of Holocaust victims that remained in the country".

== Personal life ==
Katz was among the founders of the settlement of Efrat in Gush Etzion. For the past eight years, he has resided in Kfar Tavor in the Galilee. He is married to Ruti, a nurse by profession. They have six children and 25 grandchildren.

== Published works ==
As of 2016 Katz has written 27 books, 6 of which address the history of KKL-JNF and its struggle for land.

- 2021: Judaism and Human Geography, Academic Studies Press
- 2016: The Land Shall Not Be Sold in Perpetuity: The Jewish National Fund and the History of State Ownership of Land in Israel, De Gruyter Oldenbourg
- 2014: (among editors) Garden Cities and Colonial Planning: Transnationality and Urban Ideas in Africa and Palestine, Manchester University Press; 1st edition ISBN 0719090555
- 2014: (With John Lehr) Inside the Ark. The Hutterites in Canada and the United States, University of Regina Press
- 2014: The Tombstone in Israels Military Cemetery since 1948, De Gruyter Oldenbourg (review: by Judy Baumel-Schwatz in: Israel Studies Review 33.1 (2018), 111–115)
- 2010: The Religious Kibbutz Movement in the Land of Israel, The Hebrew University Magnes Press
- 2005: The Battle for the Land, The Hebrew University Magnes Press
- 2000: (in Hebrew) Rechus Shenishkah: Legoral Rechusham Shel Korbanot Hasho`ah Hamatzui Beyisrael [Forgotten Property. The Fate of the Property of Those Who Perished in the Holocaust in Israel], Yad Vashem. Expanding his 1997 article with the same title "
- 1998: Partner to Partition: The Jewish Agency's Partition Plan in the Mandate Era , Routledge; 1st edition ISBN 0714648469
- 1998: Between Jerusalem and Hebron: Jewish Settlement in the Hebron Mountains and the Etzion Bloc in the Pre-State Period (translated from Hebrew) Bar-Ilan University Press
- 1994, Israel Studies in Historical Geography, The Business of Settlement: Private Entrepreneurship in the Jewish Settlement of Palestine, 1900-1914, The Hebrew University Magnes Press

== Awards and recognition ==
- 2016: Israel Prize in the category "Geography, Archeology, and Land of Israel studies". The prize committee noted that Katz was an international expert in historical geography: "His research and numerous books have focuses on the study of the history of Zionist settlement in Israel, buying lands and the centrality of Jerusalem in the Zionist conception"... "His research has direct and significant implications for the national ownership of land in the State of Israel and on the assets of Holocaust victims"... "Prof. Yossi acted and has had a great influence also in the civil service sphere. "

== See also ==
- Holocaust Era Asset Restitution Taskforce (2011–2014)
