= Beland, Oklahoma =

- Ghost town
- Location within Oklahoma Location within the United States
- Coordinates: 35°41′30.37″N 95°32′8.92″W
- Country: United States
- State: Oklahoma
- County: Muskogee
- Established: 1903
- Elevation: 581 ft (177 m)
- Time zone: UTC-6 (Central (CST))
  - Summer (DST): UTC-5 (CDT)
- Area code(s): 918 & 539

Beland is a ghost town in Muskogee County, Oklahoma, United States. Not much remains there, besides a few buildings.

== History ==
In 1903, Beland (formerly Chase) was founded 8 miles southwest of Muskogee, Oklahoma as a black settlement. In 1906, a wealthy African-American attorney and business man by the name of Cornelius Jones bought the entirety of Chase for $4,000 (now worth about $135,000 in today's money).

Jones sponsored selling town lots in black-owned newspapers in the south. The town's name was changed to Beland in 1908, and was successful for a bit. Beland lost its post office in 1926.
