= International Commission on Holocaust Era Insurance Claims =

The International Commission on Holocaust Era Insurance Claims (ICHEIC) was established by the National Association of Insurance Commissioners in August 1998 to identify, settle, and pay individual Holocaust era insurance claims at no cost to claimants.

ICHEIC was established in 1998 following negotiations between representatives of international Jewish and survivor organizations, the State of Israel, European insurance companies and U.S. insurance regulators. The result of the negotiations, a Memorandum of Understanding ("MOU"), was signed on August 25, 1998, by several European insurance companies.

This organization headed off the need for legislation in several U.S. states that would provide compensation for such victims. However, New York, California and Florida each passed legislation entitling survivors to compensation prior to its organization. In New York, Senator Guy Velella, sponsored such legislation and hearings with insurance archeology specialists were held to prove victims were denied such claims.

The International Commission on Holocaust Era Insurance Claims ceased accepting claim forms/applications from Holocaust survivors on March 31, 2004. According to the ICHEIC website, all timely filed claims received a final decision through the ICHEIC process by December 2006.

== See also ==
- Claims Conference
- Reparations Agreement between Israel and West Germany
- World Jewish Congress
