= Risk International =

US-based consulting firm

- Company type: Private
- Industry: Management consulting
- Founded: 1986 Houston, Texas
- Founder: Del Jones
- Headquarters: Fairlawn, Ohio, United States
- Area served: Worldwide
- Key people: Dave O'Brien(Chairman of the Board) Michael Davis (Vice Chairman); Todd Miller (President and CEO) >Kirk Walsh (Executive Vice President and COO) >Doug Talley (Member, Board of Directors)
- Number of employees: 75+
- Website: www.riskinternational.com

Risk International, founded in 1986, is a risk management consulting firm. It services clients in the areas of outsourced risk management, claims recovery, insurance archaeology, benefits advisement, actuarial services, loss prevention and mitigation. Headquartered in Fairlawn, Ohio, the company also has offices in Charlotte, North Carolina, Charleston, South Carolina, London and Ho Chi Minh City.

== History ==
Risk International's parent company was formed in 1985 when Zapata Corporation, an offshore drilling and marine services company, spun off its risk management department. Under the direction of Del R. Jones, Risk International was organized and gained its first client in 1986 when BFGoodrich, now Goodrich Corporation, outsourced its entire risk management department to Risk International.

Because of its roots in the petrochemical industry Risk International's core competency was asset risk management and insurance claims resolution. As Risk International continued to hire experienced legal and insurance industry executives, it expanded its capabilities to include insurance archaeology, loss prevention and enterprise risk management. Throughout the 1990s Risk International developed expertise in long-tail claims resolution with Fortune 500 companies.

During that period Risk International also did extensive research related to Holocaust survivor insurance claims culminating in testimony before the U.S. House of Representatives and the New York State Senate.

Risk International is headquartered in Fairlawn, Ohio where BFGoodrich, now Goodrich Corporation, maintained its worldwide headquarters. Risk International opened another office in Charlotte, North Carolina to support the growth in that region of the US marketplace.

In 2002, Del R. Jones retired from the business and Douglas L. Talley was named chairman and CEO of Risk international. After seven years, Michael D. Davis was named CEO while Talley retained his title of chairman.

Today, Dave O'Brien serves as chairman of the board, Michael Davis as vice chairman and Doug Talley continues to serves as a member of the board. In 2010, Risk International opened its first international office in London to expand its capabilities in the European marketplace. Since then, Risk International has opened another international office in Ho Chi Minh City.

== In the News ==
=== Holocaust and Kristallnacht Victims ===
In 1998, Risk International's then vice-president Douglas L. Talley provided expert testimony and evidence before the New York State Senate and evidence before the U.S. House of Representatives related to the discovery and examination of historical documents related to Holocaust victims insurance policies. Based on this evidence, he asserted that the victims of the Holocaust were the target of a Nazi scheme to confiscate insurance benefits, and beginning with Kristallnacht, insurance companies conspired to deny claims to German Jews.

Upon conclusion of its investigations the United States Congress, New York Senate and other states passed legislation that paved the way for victims to recover monetary damages from still-existing companies and organizations.

=== International Expansion ===
In March, 2010, Risk International announced the opening of its first international office in London. The UK-based team will serve its European clients and pave the way for growth within the E.U. market. Less than 18 months later, Risk International announced the opening of its second international office in Singapore. At the same time it announced a new site security service offering.
