= Public apologies for slavery in the United States =

In the 21st century, various legislatures have issued public apologies for slavery in the United States.

On February 24, 2007, the Virginia General Assembly passed House Joint Resolution Number 728, acknowledging "with profound regret the involuntary servitude of Africans and the exploitation of Native Americans, and call for reconciliation among all Virginians". With the passing of this resolution, Virginia became the first state to acknowledge through the state's governing body their state's negative involvement in slavery. The passing of this resolution was in anticipation of the 400th anniversary commemoration of the founding of Jamestown, Virginia (the first permanent English settlement in North America), which was an early colonial slave port. Apologies have also been issued by Alabama, California, Florida, Maryland, New Jersey, and North Carolina.

On July 29, 2008, during the 110th United States Congress session, the United States House of Representatives passed a resolution, 'H.Res. 194', apologizing for American slavery and subsequent discriminatory laws.

The U.S. Senate unanimously passed a similar resolution on June 18, 2009, apologizing for the "fundamental injustice, cruelty, brutality, and inhumanity of slavery". It also explicitly states that it cannot be used for restitution claims.

== See also ==
- Reparations for slavery in the United States
