= Apotropos =

Halakha term for legal guardian

Apotropos (Heb. אפוטרופוס) is the term in Halakha (traditional Jewish law) for legal guardian; it is derived from the Greek ἐπίτροπος which means 'guardian' or 'curator'. Some people erroneously think that it comes from ἀπότροπος.

The need for an apotropos arises with persons who are unable to take care of their own affairs, such as minors and adults who are mentally disabled or absentees. The term is carried over into contemporary Israeli law; see the Hebrew article.
