= Insurance archaeology =

Insurance archaeology is the process of recovering old insurance policies. Organizations that are worth a lot of money, and with a long history of providing a product that have the potential of causing harm, accident, or even death to others must make sure that their liability is mitigated. At times, lawsuits are brought up against organizations for harm caused to someone by a product they provided years ago. When that happens, companies rely on old insurance policies, but keeping record of those policies can be difficult. When no cases arise, there is no need to worry about the old policy, but when lawsuits are brought to the table, documentation of all past insurance policies becomes necessary.

== Legal Cases ==
There are cases where the company has no evidence of the coverage. While insurance archaeologists are able to find the policy documentation from decades long past, sometimes that is not possible, but they are still able to get the insurance company to cover the claims should a case arise using secondary evidence.
