= Legal guardian =

Person with the legal authority to handle the care affairs of another person

A legal guardian is a person who has been appointed by a court or otherwise has the legal authority (and the corresponding duty) to make decisions relevant to the personal and property interests of another person who is deemed incompetent, called a ward. For example, a legal guardian might be granted the authority to make decisions regarding a ward's housing or medical care or manage the ward's finances. Guardianship is most appropriate when an alleged ward is functionally incapacitated, meaning they have a lagging skill critical to performing certain tasks, such as making important life decisions. Guardianship intends to serve as a safeguard to protect the ward.

Anyone can petition for a guardianship hearing if they believe another individual cannot make rational decisions on their own behalf. In a guardianship hearing, a judge ultimately decides whether guardianship is appropriate and, if so, will appoint a guardian. Guardians are typically used in four situations: guardianship for an incapacitated elderly person (due to old age or infirmity), guardianship for a minor, and guardianship for developmentally disabled adults and for adults found to be incompetent. A family member is most commonly appointed guardian, though a professional guardian or public trustee may be appointed if a suitable family member is not available.

== Guardianship for incapacitated elderly ==
Guardianship for an incapacitated elderly person typically arises when someone determines that an elderly person has become unable to care for their own person and/or property. In fact, most alleged wards are elderly (Ms = 76–82 years), many of whom resided in a care facility and had been diagnosed with a neurological impairment such as dementia. Typically, a precipitating incident prompts a professional, family member, health care worker, or clergyman to initiate guardianship proceedings. While guardianship intends to protect and support incapacitated elderly people unable to care themselves or engage in the activities of daily living without assistance, guardianship sometimes results in financial exploitation of wards.

The process will generally start with a determination whether the alleged incapacitated person is actually incapacitated. There will often be an evidentiary hearing. A systematic review of guardianship studies from the United States, Sweden, and Australia found that the most commonly used evidence in guardianship hearings was the alleged ward's medical condition; perhaps surprisingly, descriptions of the alleged ward's cognitive abilities, functional abilities and psychiatric symptoms are much less common.

If the court determines an individual is incapacitated, the court then determines whether a guardian is necessary, the extent of the guardian's legal authority, (e.g. a guardian may be needed for the person's finances but not for the person) and, if so, who the guardian should be. The determination of whether a guardianship is necessary may consider a number of factors, including whether there is a lesser restrictive alternative, such as the use of an already existing power of attorney and health care proxy. In some cases, a guardianship dispute can become quite contentious and can result in litigation between a parent and adult children or between different siblings against each other in what is essentially a pre-probate dispute over a parent's wealth.

== Guardianship abuse ==
Sometimes guardians misuse their authority and harm the person they are supposed to protect including financial, physical, psychological or any other type of abuse of an older person or person with a disability. A report published in 2010 by the U.S. Government Accountability Office looked at 20 selected closed cases in which guardians stole or otherwise improperly obtained assets from clients. In 6 of these 20 cases, the courts failed to adequately screen guardians ahead of time and appointed individuals with criminal convictions or significant financial problems, and in 12 of 20 cases, the courts failed to oversee guardians once they had been appointed.

In October 2017, The New Yorker published an article looking at the situation in Nevada in which professional guardians sometimes have a number of clients, and argued toward the conclusion that in a number of cases the courts did not properly oversee these arrangements. In 2018, the investigative documentary "The Guardians" was published, alleging "legal kidnapping of elderly people" in Nevada by private guardianship businesses with no familial or other preexisting relations to their wards, seeking to economically profit from seniors' savings. A similar investigation by ProPublica in 2024 discovered a guardianship company in New York (New York Guardianship Services) has chronically provided little to no actual services for elderly individuals under their care while consistently taking money from them. One example includes the company taking money from an individual who had left the country and died.

== Guardianship for minors ==
=== Natural guardian ===
A minor child's parents are the child's natural guardians.

=== Legal guardian ===
Most jurisdictions recognise that the parents of a child are the natural guardians of the child, and that the parents may designate who shall become the child's legal guardian in the event of death, typically subject to the approval of the court. The court may appoint a guardian for a minor if their parents are disabled or deceased or if the minor's parents cannot properly manage their child's safety and well-being. If a non-parent is appointed as guardian, the court will determine how the parents' parental rights are impacted by the appointment (e.g., establishing visitation schedules).

== Guardianship for disabled adults ==
Legal guardians may be appointed in guardianship cases for adults (see also conservatorship). For example, because parents are not automatically appointed to serve as the guardian of their mentally or physical disabled child who reaches adulthood, parents may start a guardianship action to become the legal guardians when the child reaches the age of majority.

A famous example of such an arrangement is the situation involving Britney Spears, who was placed into a conservatorship under the supervision of her father, Jamie Spears, and attorney Andrew Wallet in 2008, following a series of highly publicized personal struggles and issues with mental health.

== Rules applicable to all guardians ==
Courts generally have the power to appoint a guardian for an individual in need of special protection. A guardian with responsibility for both the personal well-being and the financial interests of the ward is a general guardian. A person may also be appointed as a special guardian, having limited powers over the interests of the ward. A special guardian may, for example, be given the legal right to determine the disposition of the ward's property without being given any authority over the ward's person.

Depending on the jurisdiction, a legal guardian may be called a "conservator", "tutor", "custodian", or curator. Many jurisdictions and the Uniform Probate Code distinguish between a "guardian" or "guardian of the person" who is an individual with authority over and fiduciary responsibilities for the physical person of the ward, and a "conservator" or "guardian of the property" of a ward who has authority over and fiduciary responsibilities for significant property (often an inheritance or personal injury settlement) belonging to the ward. Some jurisdictions provide for public guardianship programs serving incapacitated adults or children.

A guardian is a fiduciary and is held to a very high standard of care in exercising their powers. If the ward owns substantial property, then the guardian may be required to give a surety bond to protect the ward in case dishonesty or incompetence on their part causes financial loss to the ward.

== Guardian ad litem ==
The Latin legal term ad litem means "for the lawsuit" or "for the legal proceeding". A guardian ad litem is thus someone appointed to represent in court the interests of a person too vulnerable to represent themselves, typically due to youth or mental incapacity.

Guardianship is not federally regulated in the United States; therefore, states vary widely in how they address and manage guardianship cases.

=== Family law and dependency courts ===
Guardians ad litem (GsAL) are persons appointed by the court to represent "the best interests of the child" in court proceedings. They are not the same as "legal guardians" and are often appointed in under-age-children cases, many times to represent the interests of the minor children. Guardians ad litem may be called, in some U.S. states, Court Appointed Special Advocates (CASA). In New York State, they are known as attorneys-for-the-child (AFCs). They are the voice of the child and may represent the child in court, with many judges adhering to any recommendation given by a GAL. GALs may assist where a child is removed from a hostile environment and custody given to the relevant state or county family services agency, and in those cases assists in the protection of the minor child.

Qualifications vary by state, ranging from no experience or qualification, volunteers to social workers to attorneys to others. The GAL's only job is to represent the minor children's best interest and advise the court. A guardian ad litem is an officer of the court, does not represent the parties in the suit, and often enjoys quasi-judicial immunity from any action from the parties involved in a particular case. Qualifications for becoming recognized as a GAL could differ in some states. In, for instance, North Carolina, an applicant (volunteer) must go through a background check and complete 30 hours of training. In Minnesota, the minimum qualifications to become a GAL are Bachelor's degree in psychology, social work, education, nursing, criminal justice, law or child-related discipline and some experience working with families and children or an equivalent combination of education and relevant experience. In addition, experience as a Guardian ad Litem with completion of the Guardian ad Litem pre-service orientation requirements is requested.

Although a guardian ad litem working through a CASA program volunteers their services, some guardians ad litem are paid for their services. They must submit detailed time and expense reports to the court for approval. Their fees are taxed as costs in the case. Courts may order all parties to share in the cost, or the court may order a particular party to pay the fees. Volunteer guardians ad litem and those that volunteer though a CASA program need to make sure that they do not engage in the unauthorized practice of law. Therefore, when they appear in court (even if they are an attorney) as a volunteer GAL, it is best practice to be represented by an attorney and have attorneys file motions on their behalf.

Guardians ad litem are also appointed in cases where there has been an allegation of child abuse, child neglect, PINS, juvenile delinquency, or dependency. In these situations, the guardian ad litem is charged to represent the best interests of the minor child, which can differ from the position of the state or government agency as well as the interest of the parent or guardian. These guardians ad litem vary by jurisdiction and can be volunteer advocates or attorneys. For example, in North Carolina, trained GAL volunteers are paired with attorney advocates to advocate for the best interest of abused and neglected children. The program defines a child's best interest as a safe, permanent home.

=== Mental health and probate courts ===
Guardians ad litem can be appointed by the court to represent the interests of mentally ill or disabled persons. For example, the Code of Virginia requires that the court appoint a "discreet and competent attorney-at-law" or "some other discreet and proper person" to serve as guardian ad litem to protect the interests of a person under a disability.

== Estates and financial decision making ==
Guardians ad litem are sometimes appointed in probate matters to represent the interests of unknown or unlocated heirs to an estate.

== Settlement guardians ad litem ==
When a settlement is reached in personal injury or medical malpractice cases involving claims brought on behalf of a minor or an incapacitated plaintiff, courts normally appoint a guardian ad litem to review the terms of the settlement, and to ensure it is fair and in the best interests of the claimant. The settlement guardian ad litem thoroughly investigates the case, to determine whether the settlement amount is fair and reasonable.

== Alternatives to guardianship ==
Because guardianship limits a ward's autonomy and ability to make certain life decisions, guardianship has the potential to damage a ward's health and well-being. As a result, individuals considering guardianship to support a loved one with functional incapacities might consider whether there are less restrictive alternatives that can achieve the same objectives. Three examples of alternatives include establishing advance directives, relying on supported decision-making, or taking advantage of community-related services that support individuals with functional limitations.

Advance directives allow a competent individual to provide their input as to what actions should be taken should they become incompetent. For example, in a healthcare setting, an advance directive would allow a patient to voice what treatment options they prefer and who they would like to make decisions on their behalf should they become incompetent. The establishment of advance directives is a common practice among seniors in the United States.

Further, some individuals with limited functional capacities might maintain their autonomy by relying on family or friends who can help that individual informally or formally navigate important life decisions without formal guardianship, called "supported decision-making". For example, these support individuals can provide suggestions on where their loved one should live or recommend certain treatment options in medical settings. This support system can also help the individual modify their environment to promote their success. For example, if a family member is concerned that their loved one with reduced functional capacity might engage in an unsafe behavior (e.g., leaving the gas stove on), this family member can reduce the opportunity for this behavior (e.g., removing the gas stove) without court involvement. This technique allows individuals to support and empower loved ones who are cognitively impaired.

Finally, employing community services that will alleviate stressors of daily living may allow an alleged ward to maintain their autonomy. For example, certain volunteer organizations provide services such as telephone check-ins and home visits, and many medical or mental health professionals offer in-home services.

In summary, while guardianship sometimes offers the best solution to supporting an individual who demonstrates functional incapacity, one might consider exploring alternative solutions before seeking legal guardianship.

== Guardianship by country ==
=== Republic of Korea ===
==== Types of Guardians under Korean Guardianship Law ====
- Adult guardian (성년후견인): If an adult chronically lacks the mental competence to manage their own matters due to illness, disability, old age, or other conditions, a Korean court may appoint an adult guardian. This type of guardianship in Korea gives near total power over the ward to the Adult Guardian.
- Limited guardian (한정후견인): A person may also be designated as a "special guardian", entrusted with restricted authority over the ward's interests. For example, a special guardian may be granted the legal authority in Korea to decide how to handle the ward's assets without being granted any control over the ward's person.
- Specified guardian (특정후견인): A specified guardian is a person appointed to represent a person's interests in relation to a particular court proceeding or process.

==== The process of appointing a guardian through Korean courts ====
The Korean Family Courts, typically, has the authority to appoint a guardian in Korea. A general adult guardian is one who is in charge of both the ward's financial interests and personal welfare. The Korean family court, or one of its branches, has authority over the ward's address and will hear the guardianship case. When the Family Court is not present in the ward's address, typically, a district court or a branch court has jurisdiction over the matter.

Typically, after an evaluation of the ward's health by a doctor, the court proceedings begin. The court will often question the ward and hear his/her testimony regarding the guardianship. So that the ward can make the most use of his or her remaining capacity and choose a suitable guardian. The court has the power to decide the beginning of guardianship, the choice of a guardian, change of guardian, cessation of guardianship, the extent of the legal representative's authority, etc.

=== England and Wales ===
Guardians ad litem are employed by Children and Family Court Advisory and Support Service (CAFCASS), a non-departmental public body, to represent the interests of children in cases where the child's wishes differ from those of either parent, known as a Section 16.4 case. The posts are filled by senior social workers with experience in family law proceedings.

In 2006, a legal status of "special guardianship" was introduced (using powers delegated by the Adoption and Children Act 2002) to allow for a child to be cared for by a person with rights similar to a traditional legal guardian, but without absolute legal separation from the child's birth parents. These are not to be confused with court-appointed special guardians in other jurisdictions.

==== Prisoners ====
See section 13 of the Prison Act 1952.

In section 4 of the Official Secrets Act 1989, the expression "legal custody" includes detention in pursuance of any enactment or any instrument made under an enactment.

==== Children ====
See section 86 of the Children Act 1975.

==== Mental patients ====
Any person required or authorized by or by virtue of the Mental Health Act 1983 to be conveyed to any place or to be kept in custody or detained in a place of safety or at any place to which he is taken under section 42(6) of that Act is, while being so conveyed, detained or kept, as the case may be, deemed to be in legal custody. In England and Wales, only an Approved Mental Health Professional has the power to detain a person under the Act. For this purpose "convey" includes any other expression denoting removal from one place to another.

=== Germany ===
The German guardianship law with regard to adults was completely changed in 1990. Guardianship (Vormundschaft) of an adult was renamed 'curatorship' (Betreuung), although it remains Vormundschaft for minors. When a person of full age who, as a result of mental disease or physical, mental or psychological handicap or otherwise is incapable of managing his own affairs, a guardian (Betreuer) can be appointed (section 1,896, German Civil Code). An adult guardian is responsible for personal and estate matters, as well as for medical treatment. However, the ward has normally full capacity with all human rights such as those to marry, vote or make a will. The ward's legal capacity can be lost as a result of a court judgment or order (section 1903, German Civ. C.; Einwilligungsvorbehalt). Every guardian has to report annually to the guardianship court (Betreuungsgericht). Professional guardians (Berufsbetreuer) normally hold university degrees in law or social work.

=== Israel ===
In Israel, over 50,000 adults have had legal guardians appointed for them; 85% of them have family members as their guardians, and 15% have professional guardians. Until 2014, guardians (the term there is "Apotropos") were supervised by the Office of the Administrator General at the Ministry of Justice in matters of property only. However, changes in Israel and other countries along with public pressure, appeals to the courts by social organizations, academic studies and the State Comptroller's 2004 report led to the decision to broaden the scope of supervision to include personal matters as well, to ensure that the guardians take care of all areas of life, including medical care, personal care, suitable housing, work and employment, social and recreational activities, etc., taking account of the person's wishes and acting accordingly. The Office of the Administrator General (public guardian) at the Ministry of Justice is now implementing a system to supervise guardians in regard to personal matters in order to help identify situations in which guardians are not performing their duties adequately.

=== Ireland ===
The court-appointed guardian system in Ireland was brought into law on the proposal of Seanad Éireann (the Irish Senate) member, David Norris. The Children Acts Advisory Board which was set up to advise the ministers of the government on policy development under the Child Care Act 1991 was then abolished in September 2011. Judges are responsible for appointing child guardians and can choose guardians from Barnardo's a children's charitable service or from among the self-employed guardians, who are mostly former social workers who have gone into private business since the legislation.

=== Saudi Arabia ===
Saudi Arabia has edited the law, and women in Saudi Arabia are no longer required to have a male guardian (Wali) to give permission for various government and economic transactions, as well as some personal life and health decisions.

=== Sweden ===
Swedish parental law (the Parental Code) regulates legal guardianship for both children and disabled adults. Legal guardianship for unaccompanied minors is regulated by a law of its own. Except for normal parenthood, the guardianship is assigned by the district court and supervised by the Chief Guardian, a municipal authority that is mandatory in every Swedish municipality. What is included in the field of guardianship is decided by the district court. The responsibility for health care and nursing is never included in the guardianship for adults, but is always so for minors. The guardianship for adults can take two legal forms, "conservator" or "administrator". The main difference between these two is that an "administrator" has the sole permission to take legal actions within the field of the guardianship. A guardianship can have different legal forms for different parts of the guardianship. Such things as basic human rights is never denied the ward by this law, but some of them can be denied by other laws. A conservator is normally assigned with the approval of the ward. But if the physical conditions of the ward does not permit him to give such approval, a conservator can be assigned anyhow. Everything a conservator does for his ward have to be approved by him, or can be assumed to be approved by him. For more complex situations, like taking loans or selling of a house, he or she needs approval from the local authorities. Once a year a legally assigned guardian have to send his accounting to the Chief Guardian for review.

Since 2017, the ward can, while she still have her mental abilities, write a special future letter of attorney (Framtidsfullmakt) which later can be used when she loses her abilities. How such a letter should be written is described in detail in the paternal law, and normally follows the principles of a will. This law was created since in Sweden, it is unclear if a normal letter of attorney is valid after the ward has lost her abilities.

== See also ==
- Conservatorship
- Custodial account
- Foster care
- Receivership
- Wali (Islamic legal guardian)
- Apotropos - the term in Jewish law and Israeli law
