= Reparations Agreement between Israel and the Federal Republic of Germany =

Post-World War II agreement

The Reparations Agreement between Israel and the Federal Republic of Germany (German: Luxemburger Abkommen, lit. 'Luxembourg Agreement', or Wiedergutmachungsabkommen, 'Wiedergutmachung Agreement'; Hebrew: הסכם השילומים, romanized: Heskem HaShillumim, lit. 'Reparations Agreement') was signed on September 10, 1952, and entered in force on March 27, 1953. According to the Agreement, West Germany was to pay Israel for the costs of "resettling so great a number of uprooted and destitute Jewish refugees" after the war, and to compensate individual Jews, via the Conference on Jewish Material Claims Against Germany, for losses in Jewish livelihood and property resulting from Nazi persecution.

== History ==
According to the website of the Conference on Jewish Material Claims Against Germany, or Claims Conference, "In response to calls from Jewish organizations and the State of Israel, in September 1951 Chancellor Konrad Adenauer of West Germany addressed his Parliament: "... unspeakable crimes have been committed in the name of the German people, calling for moral and material indemnity ... The Federal Government are prepared, jointly with representatives of Jewry and the State of Israel ... to bring about a solution of the material indemnity problem, thus easing the way to the spiritual settlement of infinite suffering."

One month after Adenauer's speech, Nahum Goldmann, co-chairman of the Jewish Agency for Israel and president of the World Jewish Congress, convened a meeting in New York City of 23 major Jewish national and international organizations. The participants made clear that these talks were to be limited to discussion of material claims, and thus the organization that emerged from the meeting was called the Conference on Jewish Material Claims Against Germany—the Claims Conference. The Board of Directors of the new conference consisted of groups that took part in its formation, with each member agency designating two members to the board.

In 1952, the first Israeli Prime Minister David Ben-Gurion argued that the reparation demand was based on recovering as much Jewish property as possible "so that the murderers do not become the heirs as well". His other argument was that the reparations were needed to finance the absorption and rehabilitation of the Holocaust survivors in Israel.

"The Claims Conference had the task of negotiating with the German government a program of indemnification for the material damages to Jewish individuals and to the Jewish people caused by Germany through the Holocaust."

Israel's relations with Germany, already extremely delicate on account of the Holocaust, were complicated further by Cold War politics and the division of Germany into mutually hostile Eastern and Western states; the former a communist satellite aligned with the Soviet Union, the latter a liberal democracy oriented towards the West. Due to a variety of factors, it quickly became apparent that West Germany would be the state most willing and able to deal with Israeli claims related to the Holocaust. To complicate matters further, Israel also had to be sensitive to the strategic interests of the United States which, following the breakdown in the wartime alliance with the Soviet Union, had come to believe the establishment of a prosperous West German economy was essential to forge a reliable and productive alliance with the postwar democratic government, seated in Bonn.

Israel was intent on taking in what remained of European Jewry. Israel was also recovering from the 1948 Arab–Israeli War and was facing a deep economic crisis, which led to a policy of austerity. Unemployment was very high, especially in the ma'abarot camps, and foreign currency reserves were scarce. David Ben-Gurion and his party, Mapai, took a practical approach and argued that accepting the agreement was the only way to sustain the nation's economy. "There are two approaches", he told the Mapai central committee. "One is the ghetto Jew's approach and the other is of an independent people. I don't want to run after a German and spit in his face. I don't want to run after anybody. I want to sit here and build here. I'm not going to go to America to take part in a vigil against Adenauer".

== Negotiations ==
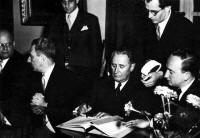
Nahum Goldmann signing the agreement, 1952

Negotiations were held between Israeli Foreign Minister Moshe Sharett and West German Chancellor Konrad Adenauer.

In 1951, Israeli authorities made a claim to the four powers occupying post-war Germany regarding compensation and reimbursement, based on the fact that Israel had absorbed and resettled 500,000 Holocaust survivors. They calculated that since absorption had cost 3,000 dollars per person (equivalent to $37,200 in 2025), they were owed 1.5 billion dollars (equivalent to $18.6 billion in 2025) by Germany. They also figured that six billion dollars' worth of Jewish property had been pillaged by the Nazis, but stressed that the Germans could never make up for what they did with any type of material recompense. Negotiations leading to the Reparations Agreement between Israel and West Germany began in March 1952 and were conducted between representatives of the government of the Federal Republic, the government of the State of Israel, and representatives of the World Jewish Congress, headed by Goldmann. These discussions led to a bitter controversy in Israel, as the coalition government, headed by David Ben-Gurion, claimed that reparations were necessary to restore what was stolen from the victims of the Holocaust.

The agreement was signed by Adenauer and Moshe Sharett on September 10, 1952, at Luxembourg City Hall. The German Parliament (Bundestag) passed the agreement on March 18, 1953, by a large majority, 239 for and 35 against, though only 106 of the ruling CDU/CSU's 214 MPs supported the motion, which relied on the unanimous support of the opposition Social Democrats to get through. The Arab League strongly opposed the motion and threatened a boycott of the Federal Republic of Germany after it passed the restitution agreement, but the plan was abandoned due to economic considerations, namely that the Arab League would suffer far more from losing trade with West Germany than West Germany would from the Arab League.

== Opposition ==
Public debate was among the fiercest in Israeli history. Opposition to the agreement came from both the right (Herut and the General Zionists) and the left (Mapam) of the political spectrum; both sides argued that accepting reparation payments were the equivalent of forgiving the Nazis for their crimes.

On 5 November 1951, Yaakov Hazan of Mapam said in the Knesset: "Nazism is rearing its ugly head again in Germany, and our so-called Western 'friends' are nurturing that Nazism; they are resurrecting Nazi Germany ... Our army, the Israel Defense Forces, will be in the same camp as the Nazi army, and the Nazis will begin infiltrating here not as our most terrible enemies, but rather as our allies ..."

At a session of the Foreign Affairs and Defense Committee in September 1952, Yitzhak Ben-Aharon, then a Mapam MK, stated, "I am not assuming that there are people who believe that Germany will pay a total of three billion marks, over a period of 12 years, and that this is no empty promise ... The Israeli government will obtain nothing but a piece of paper referring to three billion marks. And all this is only intended to mislead the public and claim the government has attained ...".

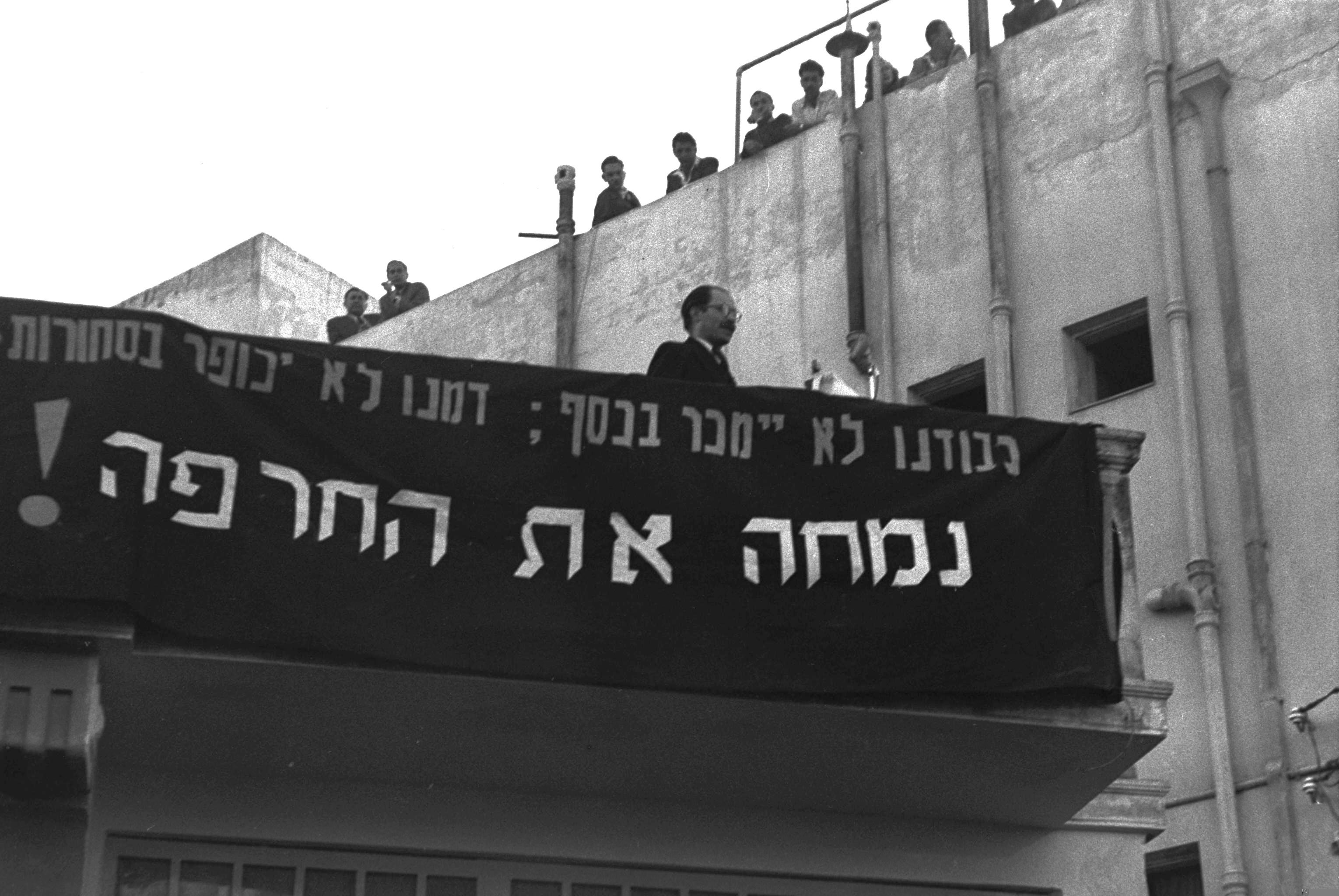
Menachem Begin protesting against the agreement in March 1952. The sign reads: "Our honor shall not be sold for money; Our blood shall not be atoned by goods. We shall wipe out the disgrace!"

Anticipating the debate in the Knesset on 7 January 1952, all adjacent roads were blocked. Roadblocks and wire fences were set up around the building and the IDF was prepared to suppress an insurrection. The rally, gathered by the agreement's opponents drew 15,000 people and the riots that ensued would be the most significant attempt in Israeli history to overturn a democratically made Knesset decision. The decision was ultimately accepted by 61–50 margin, but not before the advancing riots interrupted the plenum debate for the first time in Knesset history.

Following a passionate speech, Menachem Begin led the protesters towards the Knesset. Begin referred to the Altalena Affair in 1948, when the IDF shelled a ship carrying arms for the Irgun by order of Ben Gurion, saying, "When you fired at me with a cannon, I gave the order: 'No!' Today I will give the order, 'Yes!'" The demonstration turned violent as protesters began throwing stones at the building's windows while the police used force to disperse them. After five hours of rioting, the police took control of the situation using hoses and tear gas. Hundreds were arrested; about 200 protesters and 140 policemen were injured.

The decision did not end the protests. In October 1952 Dov Shilansky was arrested near the Foreign Ministry building, carrying a pack of dynamite. In his trial, he was accused of being a member of an underground organization against the Reparations Agreement and was sentenced to 21 months in prison. Several parcel bombs were sent to Adenauer and other targets, one of which killed a policeman who handled it.

== Implementation ==
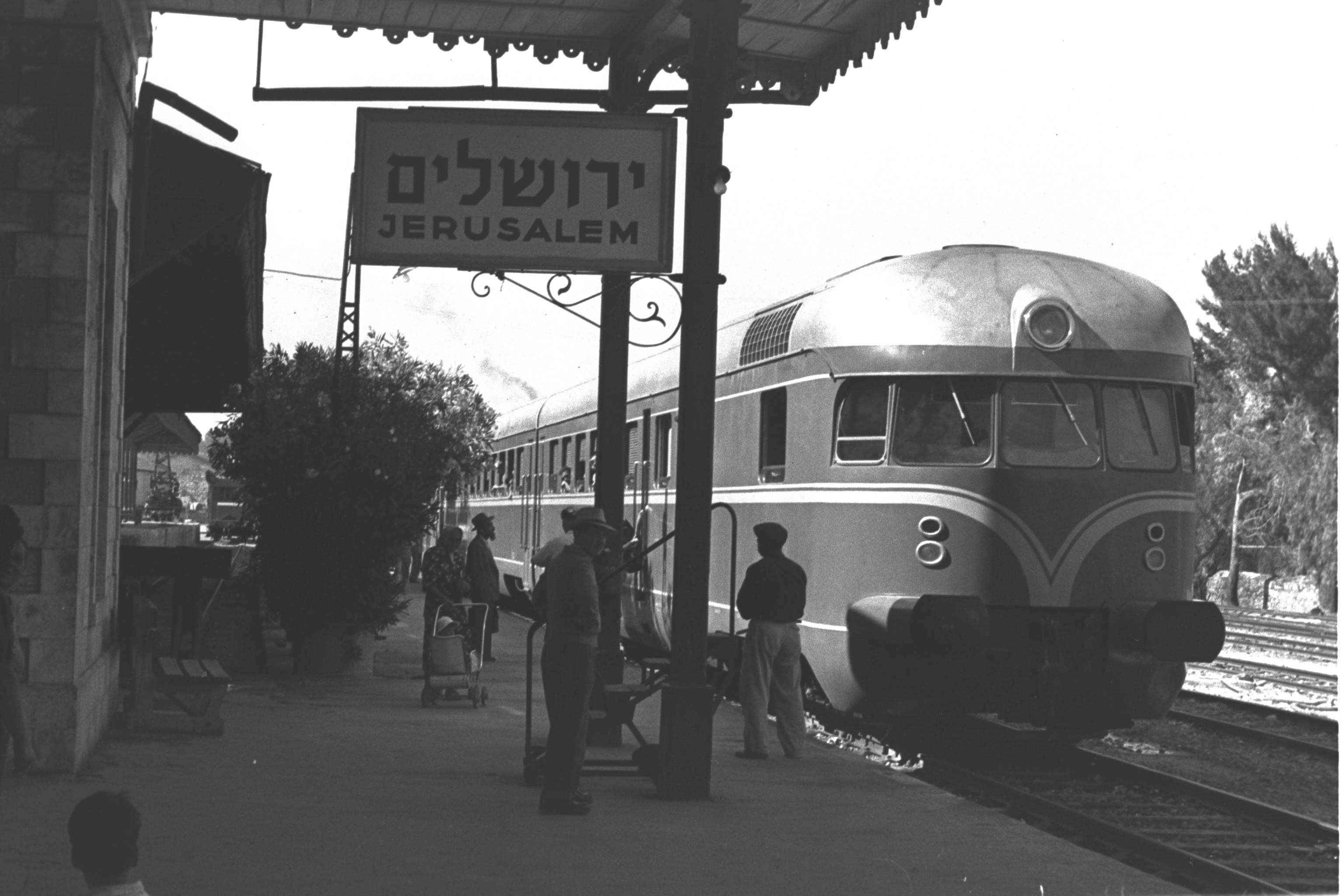
Train set manufactured by Maschinenfabrik Esslingen in the old Jerusalem Railway Station, shortly after delivery as part of the reparations agreement with Germany, 1956.

Despite the protests, the agreement was signed in September 1952, and West Germany paid Israel a sum of 3 billion marks (around 714 million USD according to 1953–1955 conversion rates) over the next fourteen years; 450 million marks were paid to the World Jewish Congress. The payments were made to the State of Israel as the heir to those victims who had no surviving family. The money was invested in the country's infrastructure and played an important role in establishing the economy of the new state. Israel at the time faced a deep economic crisis and was heavily dependent on donations by foreign Jews, and the reparations, along with these donations, would help turn Israel into an economically viable country.

The reparations were paid directly to the headquarters of the Israeli purchase delegation in Cologne, which received the money from the German government in annual installments. The delegation then bought goods and shipped them to Israel, receiving its orders from a Tel Aviv-based company that had been set up to decide what to purchase and for whom. A great part of the reparations money went into purchasing equipment and raw materials for companies that were owned by the government, the Jewish Agency, and the Histadrut labor union. Notably, much of that money went into purchasing equipment for about 1,300 industrial plants; two-thirds of this money was given to 36 factories, most of them owned by the Histadrut. At the same time, hundreds of other plants, mostly privately owned ones, received minimal assistance with reparations money. From 1953 to 1963, the reparations money funded around one-third of investment in Israel's electrical system, helping it to triple its capacity, and nearly half the total investment in Israel Railways, which obtained German-made rolling stock, tracks, and signaling equipment with reparations money. The reparations were also used to purchase German-made machinery for developing the water supply, oil drilling, mining equipment for use in extracting copper from the Timna Valley mines, and heavy equipment for agriculture and construction such as combines, tractors, and trucks. About 30% of the reparations money went into buying fuel, while 17% was used to purchase ships for the Israeli merchant fleet; some fifty ships including two passenger liners were purchased, and by 1961, these vessels constituted two-thirds of the Israeli merchant marine. Funds from the reparations were also used for port development; the Port of Haifa was able to obtain new cranes, including a floating crane that was named Bar Kokhba. The Bank of Israel credited the reparations for about 15% of Israel's GNP growth and the creation of 45,000 jobs during the 12-year period they had been in effect, though the BoI report also noted that the funds received were not crucial in that Israel would have secured the funds in any case from other sources.

Yad Vashem noted that "in the 1990s, Jews began making claims for property stolen in Eastern Europe. Various groups also began investigating what happened to the money deposited in Swiss banks by Jews outside of Switzerland who were later murdered in the Holocaust, and what happened to the funds deposited by various Nazis in Swiss banks. In addition, individual companies (many of them based in Germany) began to be pressured by survivor groups to compensate former forced laborers. Among them are Deutsche Bank, Siemens, BMW, Volkswagen and Opel. In response, early in 1999, the German government proclaimed the establishment of a fund with money from these companies to help needy Holocaust survivors. A similar fund was set up by the Swiss, as was a Hungarian fund for the compensation of Holocaust victims and their heirs. At the close of the 1990s, discussions of compensation were held by insurance companies that had before the war insured Jews who were later murdered by the Nazis. These companies include Allianz, Axa, Assicurazioni Generali, Zürich Financial Services, Winterthur, and Baloise Insurance Group. With the help of information about Holocaust victims made available by Yad Vashem, an international commission under former US Secretary of State Lawrence Eagleburger has been trying to uncover the names of those who had been insured and were murdered in the Holocaust. The World Jewish Restitution Organization was created to organize these efforts. On behalf of US citizens, the US Foreign Claims Settlement Commission reached agreements with the German government in 1998 and 1999 to compensate Holocaust victims who immigrated to the US after the war."

== Reopened claims ==
In 2007, Israeli MK Rafi Eitan made suggestions that were interpreted as a claim to reopen the agreement, although he insisted that he merely intended to "establish a German-Israeli work team that would examine how Germany could help the financially struggling survivors". Initially, German Finance Minister Peer Steinbrück rejected any possibility of expanding the agreement, but subsequently German government spokesman Thomas Steg said that Germany was willing to discuss the possibility of making extra pension payments to Holocaust survivors if the Israeli government makes an official request.

In 2009, Israeli Finance Minister Yuval Steinitz announced that he would demand a further €450 million to €1 billion in reparations from Germany on behalf of some 30,000 Israeli forced labor survivors.

== See also ==
- Claims Conference
- International Commission on Holocaust Era Insurance Claims
- Foundation "Remembrance, Responsibility and Future"
- Wiedergutmachung
- Restitution
- Reparation (legal)
- Reparations
- Article 231 of the Treaty of Versailles
