= Callie House =

African American political activist (1861–1928)

Callie Guy House
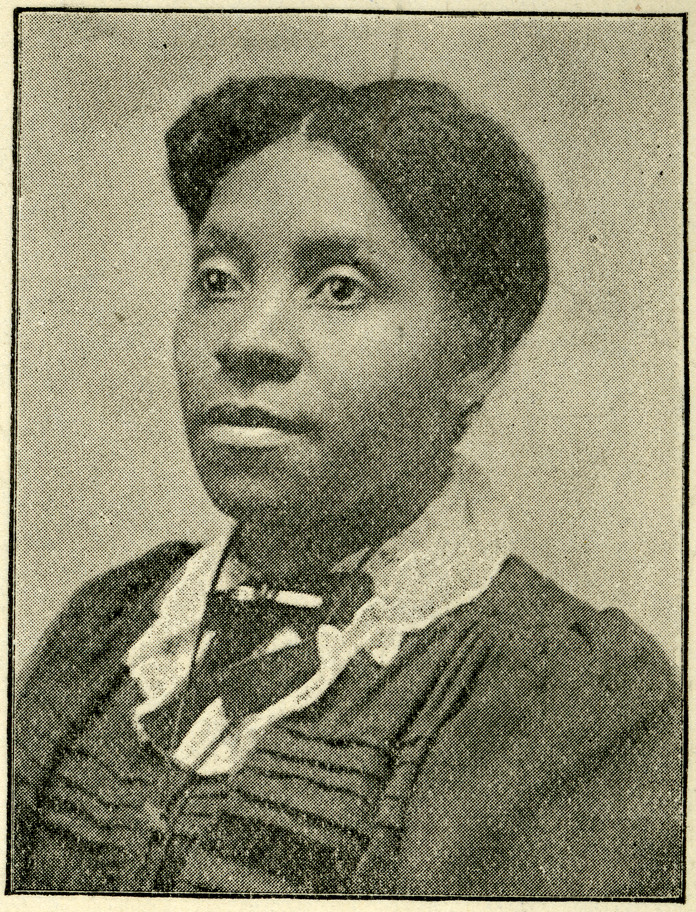
- Born: 1861; Rutherford County, near Nashville, Tennessee
- Died: 1928 (aged 66–67)

Callie House (1861–1928) was a leader of the National Ex-Slave Mutual Relief, Bounty and Pension Association, one of the first organizations to campaign for reparations for slavery in the United States. She was prosecuted for her efforts to secure reparations and was jailed after her conviction by an all white male jury.

== Biography ==
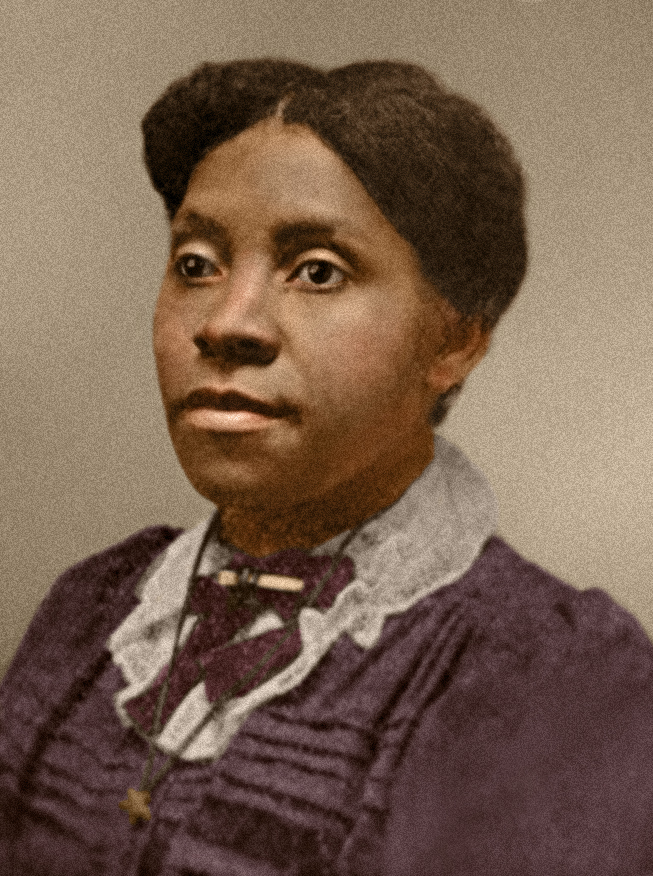
Callie House, a widow, mother, and former slave, became a national leader of the ex-slave pension movement.

House was born enslaved in Rutherford County, near Nashville, Tennessee. At the age of 22, she married William House. They had six children, five of whom survived. After William died, House supported her family by being a washerwoman. At 36, she began organizing hundreds of thousands of people calling for US reparations, building a powerful movement for which she was unjustly imprisoned in 1916.

== National Ex-Slave Mutual Relief, Bounty, and Pension Association ==
While slavery was officially abolished following the 13th Amendment, many former enslaved persons were forced into sharecropping and doing menial labor as they had no financial freedom or resources. With no promise of economic relief or security from the government, House and Isaiah H. Dickerson traveled to former slave states to gather support for the National Ex-Slave Mutual Relief, Bounty and Pension Association (MRB&PA).

At the time, many Americans were supportive of elderly war veterans receiving pensions. This gave former enslaved persons hope that they might receive pensions for their unpaid labor, too. The push for ex-slave pensions gained momentum and MRB&PA was chartered on August 7, 1897. It had two main goals: to petition Congress for a bill that would grant compensation (reparations) to former enslaved persons, and to provide mutual aid and burial expenses. By the late 1890s, MRB&PA became the leading grassroots association for ex-slave pensions with membership in the hundreds of thousands.

With this growth, came an increase in surveillance. Three federal agencies—the Bureau of Pensions, the Post Office Department, and the Department of Justice sought to end this movement. Without evidence, only the Post Office Department could accuse organizations such as MRB&PA by citing fraud and arguing that US mail was being used to defraud slaves.

On September 20, 1899, the MRB&PA was issued a fraud order, making it forbidden for them to send mail or cash money orders. Despite House's efforts (invoking 1st, 14th, and 15th Amendment rights; hiring an attorney), the Post Office Department was determined to invoke the fraud order in order to limit the MRB&PA's influence.

Meanwhile, the pensions bill submitted to Congress was not taken seriously and the committee called for its indefinite postponement. Upon hearing this, House reminded the commissioner that the Constitution of the United States grants its citizens the right to petition Congress for a redress of grievances.

Upon Dickerson's death in 1909, House became the leader of the MRB&PA and the movement. Despite interference with mail, the MRB&PA struggled on under House's leadership. House also decided to take the pension movement to the courts.

== Reparations lawsuit ==
In 1915, under House's leadership, the association filed a class-action lawsuit, Johnson v. McAdoo, in federal court against the U.S. Treasury Department for 68 million dollars. $68 million was the amount of cotton tax collected between 1862 and 1868 and, it was argued, was due to the plaintiffs because this cotton had been produced by them and their ancestors as a result of their involuntary servitude. This was the first documented Black reparations litigation in the US on the federal level. The U.S. Court of Appeals for the District of Columbia denied the claim based on governmental immunity as did the U.S. Supreme Court, siding with the Appeals Court's decision.

== Arrest, trial and imprisonment ==
The US Postal Service's accusations of fraud culminated in 1916 with House's arrest. She was convicted by an all-male, all-white jury and sentenced to one year in prison in Jefferson City, Missouri. House's arrest dampened the national reparations movement, which struggled on through local branches until the 1930s.

== Legacy ==
In 2015 Vanderbilt University's African American and Diaspora Studies Program renamed its research arm the Callie House Research Center for the Study of Black Cultures and Politics.

== See also ==
- Dorothy Tillman
