= National Ex-Slave Mutual Relief, Bounty and Pension Association =

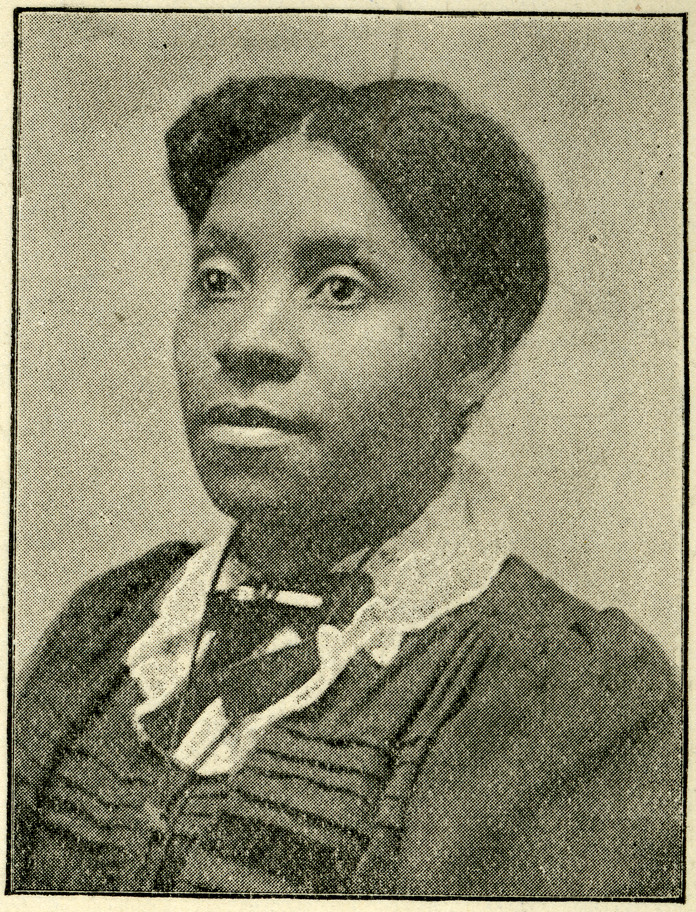
Co-Founder of the MRB&PA Callie House (1861–1928).

The National Ex-Slave Mutual Relief, Bounty and Pension Association (MRB&PA) was an organization founded for the purpose of obtaining pensions for former slaves from the Federal government as compensation and reparations for their unpaid labor and suffering. Founded in 1896 and chartered in 1898 in Nashville, Tennessee, the organization was founded by former slaves Callie House and Isaiah H. Dickerson. According to historian Mary Frances Berry, the organization was "the first mass reparations movement led by African Americans."

== Early history ==
One early effort to obtain pensions for ex-slaves was led by white newspaper editor, Walter R. Vaughan of Omaha, Nebraska. He modeled his plan off of pensions provided by the Federal government to former Union soldiers, and he persuaded his congressman, William James Connell (R-NE) to introduce the measure to the House of Representatives in 1890. A native of Selma, Alabama, Vaughan believed that pensions to former slaves would provide increased economic vitality and stability to the New South. In 1891 he published a pamphlet entitled "Freedmen's Pension Bill: A Plea for American Freedmen," and sold copies at a dollar a piece. A black man who worked as a distributor of Vaughan's pamphlet was Isaiah Dickerson of Rutherford County, Tennessee. A few years later, Dickerson and Callie House would launch their own pension and reparations movement by forming an organization led by and composed of African Americans. The 1900 Nashville City Directory lists the address of the National Ex-Slave Mutual Relief, Bounty and Pension Application as being located at 903 Church Street in Nashville.

== Conventions ==
The first annual convention of the National Ex-Slave Mutual Relief, Bounty and Pension Association was held November 28 through December 1, 1898, in Nashville, Tennessee, at Gay Street Christian Church. Among those in attendance were James C. Napier and Rev. R. H. Boyd. One primary focus of this first meeting was to take stands to support or oppose federal legislation on matters affecting former slaves.

== Legislative efforts ==
The organization supported a bill introduced by Jeremiah D. Botkin (D-KS) in March 1898 to obtain homesteads for former slaves and their families.

== Relief efforts ==
The organization also sought to provide various forms of relief and support to its members. This included burial benefits and aid to its members in times of sickness or crisis.

== Federal investigations ==
The organization was subject to investigation and prosecution by the U.S. Department of Justice and the Post Office for supposedly using the mails to defraud its members.

== Decline ==
Callie House was imprisoned in 1918, and this effectively ended the legislative efforts of the National Ex-Slave Mutual Relief, Bounty and Pension Association.
