= Claims Conference =

Organization for Jewish recovery for Nazi crimes

- Conference on Jewish Material Claims Against Germany
- Formation: October 1951; 74 years ago
- Purpose: "negotiates for and disburses funds to individuals and organizations and seeks the return of Jewish property stolen during the Holocaust"
- Headquarters: New York City
- Region served: Worldwide
- President: Gideon Taylor
- Affiliations: World Jewish Restitution Organization, International Commission on Holocaust Era Insurance Claims
- Website: https://www.claimscon.org/

The Conference on Jewish Material Claims Against Germany, or Claims Conference, represents the world's Jews in negotiating for compensation and restitution for victims of Nazi persecution and their heirs. According to Section 2(1)(3) of the Property Law of Germany, the Claims Conference is a legal successor with respect to the claims not filed on time by Jewish people. This fact was reasserted in decisions of some lawsuits which attempted to redefine the Claims Conference as a "trustee" of these assets. These lawsuits were dismissed. The Claims Conference administers compensation funds, recovers unclaimed Jewish property, and allocates funds to institutions that provide social welfare services to Holocaust survivors and preserve the memory and lessons of the Holocaust. Julius Berman has led the organization as chairman of the board, and currently president, as of 2020.

== History ==
The organization was founded in 1951 as a result of negotiations between 23 national and international Jewish organizations and the government of West Germany under Chancellor Konrad Adenauer.

== Compensation programs ==
As of 2012, the Claims Conference had administered the following programs, which provide direct payments to Jewish victims of Nazi persecution. Programs were negotiated with the German government and are subject to eligibility criteria determined by the German government. The Conference continually negotiates to expand and liberalize eligibility criteria in order to include additional victims in the programs. In 1978, after 25 years of payments, the total Federal Republic of Germany compensation payments amounted to 53 billion Deutsch Marks. Payments from some programs continue to this day.

- The Article 2 Fund, a lifetime pension for certain persons who were incarcerated in concentration camps, ghettos, or forced labor battalions, or who were forced to go into hiding. Eligibility criteria have been negotiated continually with Germany, and include limits on income, established by the German government.
- The Central and Eastern European Fund, a pension program similar to the Article 2 Fund, which distributes payments to survivors located in Eastern Europe and the former Soviet Union (FSU).
- Hardship Fund, a one-time payment for Jewish victims of Nazism who emigrated from Soviet bloc countries and meet certain eligibility criteria established by the German government.
- Holocaust Victims Compensation Fund, a one-time payment for Jewish victims of Nazism who fled from the Nazis. Comparable to the Hardship Fund but for current residents of the Former Soviet Union. Application deadline has expired.
- The Child Survivor Fund is a one-time payment intended to acknowledge the suffering of Holocaust survivors who endured unimaginable trauma in their childhoods. This fund is open to Jewish Nazi victims who were persecuted as Jews and were born January 1, 1928, or later.
- The Spouse of Holocaust Survivor Fund is a fund to compensate the spouses of deceased recipients of the Claims Conference's Article 2 or Central and Eastern European (CEEF) pension funds.
- Romanian Survivor Relief Program - in 2018 the Claims Conference announced the availability of funds from the Caritatea Foundation in Romania to be distributed to Jewish Nazi victims who lived under the Romanian regime anytime between 1937 and 1944 and currently live outside of Romania and Israel. The Caritatea Foundation was created by the Federation of Jewish Communities in Romania and the World Jewish Restitution Organization (WJRO). These funds are from the restitution of communal properties wrongfully taken from Jewish communities of Romania during and after World War II.
- Program for Former Slave and Forced Laborers, a one-time payment for persons "compelled to perform work in a concentration camp...a ghetto, or a similar place of incarceration under comparable conditions." Application deadline has expired.
- Fund for Victims of Medical Experiments and Other Injuries: Application deadline has expired.
- Fund for the Vaccination of Holocaust Survivors

In 2022, the Claims Conference allocated funds for welfare services to support approximately 10,000 Jewish Holocaust survivors (5,000 with home care and 500 bed-bound) in Ukraine, who required additional assistance due to the Russian invasion of Ukraine in February 2022. The organization also committed an additional $47 million for welfare services in 2023, alongside other direct payments to survivors.

== International Holocaust Survivors Night (IHSN) ==
Every year since 2017 the Claims Conference has hosted International Holocaust Survivors Night on the third night of Chanukah to honor Jewish survivors of the Shoah. Events have been hosted in Jerusalem, Berlin, the New York/New Jersey metro area, Paris and Moscow.

== Criticism ==
On May 19, 2006, The Jewish Chronicle revealed that the Claims Conference highest-paid official, executive vice-president Gideon Taylor, was awarded $437,811 (£240,000) in salary and pension (2004 numbers). An advisor to British survivors in compensation claims in the 1990s, Dr Pinto-Duschinsky, commented: "It is wrong for the executive vice-president to earn annually the same as the compensation for several hundred former slave laborers. The moral authority of the leading Jewish organizations is gravely weakened by excessively high salaries for top officials."

One of the most outspoken critics of the Claims Conference is Isi Leibler, the former chairman of the Governing Board of the World Jewish Congress, who cites allegations of incompetence, impropriety and cover-ups as well as the absence of an independent review board, bureaucratization and a domination by a small clique.

In an article of The Jerusalem Post he says that "the richest Jewish foundation in the world, has still failed to provide adequate financial assistance to elderly and sick Holocaust survivors who live in abject poverty in the twilight of their lives. An organization which boasts that it currently holds in trust $900 million in assets, yet fails to rectify such a condition, must be held accountable for one of the greatest scandals in contemporary Jewish life."

The priorities of the organization have also been criticized. Among the critics is the Claims Conference own treasurer, Roman Kent, a Holocaust survivor, who told The Jewish Chronicle: "Survivors are suffering. Our only priority should be the survivors, and everything else should be secondary. We are spending money for thousands of projects, but the health of the survivors can't wait. They are dying daily." [...] "I'm not saying that these are bad programs, but they can wait – or else they should be the responsibility of the world Jewish community, not the Claims Conference.

In a 2006 investigative report, it was claimed the organization, while having $1.7 billion in its accounts, finances welfare assistance for only 9,000 survivors while "tens of millions of dollars each year" are spent on management expenses.

Amidst this mounting criticism, the office of Germany's independent federal auditor announced it was considering an investigation of the Claims Conference in June 2008.

In 2023 Claims Conference launched an international investigation into Holocaust denialism. They presented the claim that a large percentage of Dutch youth dismissed the Holocaust. However, several investigators and reporters postulate that the research was done shoddily. Yet a more recent and extensive investigation by the Dutch government in 2024 does seem to correspond with the key findings of the Claims Conference report.

== Money stolen from Claims Conference ==
On November 9, 2010, the US Attorney's Office announced an indictment against 11 employees of the Claims Conference and several other individuals for fraud and embezzlement of over $42 million from the Claims Conference. The Claims Conference management alerted the Federal Bureau of Investigation as soon as it discovered the fraud in 2009, and continues to cooperate with the FBI. On October 19, 2012, The Forward reported that the fraud had grown to $57 million. In 2013, an 8-year jail sentence was handed down to Art. 2 funds director Semen Domnitser.

== Notable people ==
- Stuart E. Eizenstat, Chief Negotiator Ambassador
- Nahum Goldmann, lead negotiator against Germany in 1951

== See also ==
- Bona vacantia
- International Commission on Holocaust Era Insurance Claims
- Reparations Agreement between Israel and West Germany
- World Jewish Congress
