= Criminalization of homosexuality =

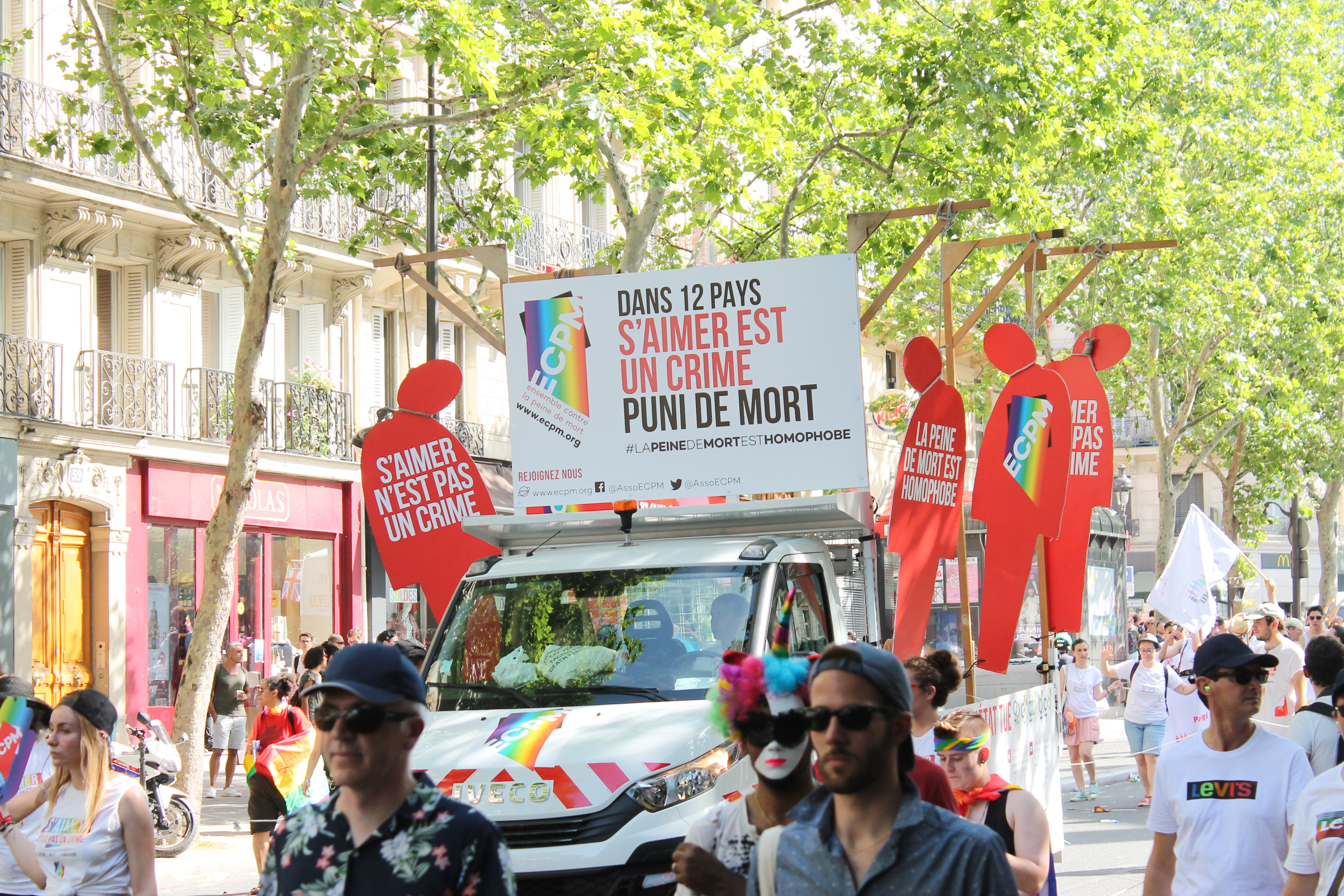
"Love is not a crime" signs at Paris Pride 2019

Some or all sexual acts between men, and less frequently between women, have been classified as a criminal offense in various regions. Most of the time, such laws are unenforced with regard to consensual same-sex conduct, but they nevertheless contribute to police harassment, stigmatization, and violence against homosexual and bisexual people. Other effects include exacerbation of the HIV epidemic due to the criminalization of men who have sex with men, discouraging them from seeking preventative care or treatment for HIV infection.

The criminalization of homosexuality is often justified by the scientifically discredited idea that homosexuality can be acquired or by public revulsion towards homosexuality, in many cases founded on the condemnation of homosexuality by the Abrahamic religions (Judaism, Christianity, and Islam). Arguments against the criminalization of homosexuality began to be expressed during the Enlightenment. Initial objections included the practical difficulty of enforcement, excessive state intrusion into private life, and the belief that criminalization was not an effective way of reducing the incidence of homosexuality. Later objections included the argument that homosexuality should be considered a disease rather than a crime, that criminalization violates the human rights of homosexuals, and that homosexuality is not morally wrong.

In many countries, criminalization of homosexuality is based on legal codes inherited from the British Empire. The French colonial empire did not lead to criminalization of homosexuality, as this was abolished in France during the French Revolution in order to remove religious influence from the criminal law. In other countries, the criminalization of homosexuality is based on sharia law. In the Western world, a major wave of decriminalization started after World War II. It diffused globally and peaked in the 1990s. In recent years, many African countries have increased enforcement of anti-homosexual laws due to politicization and a mistaken belief that homosexuality is a Western import. As of 2025, homosexuality is not criminalized in 131 countries and is criminalized de jure in 62 UN member states and de facto in two others; at least seven of these have a death penalty for homosexuality.

== History ==
=== Ancient through early modern world ===
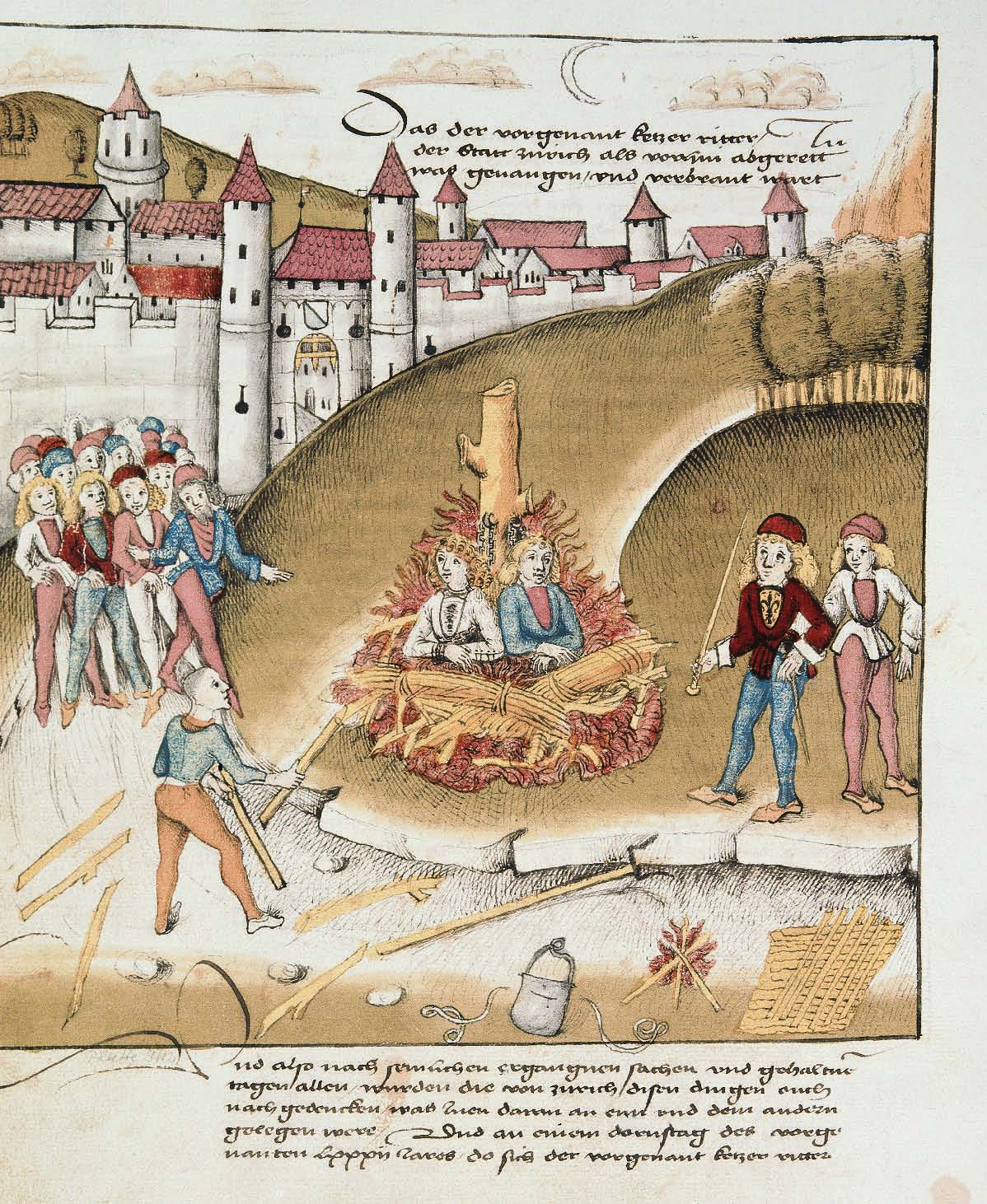
The burning of the knight Richard Puller von Hohenburg with his servant before the walls of Zurich, for sodomy, 1482

The Assyrian Laws contain a passage punishing homosexual relations, but it is disputed if this refers to consensual relations or only non-consensual ones. The ancient Germanic tribes frequently executed men who engaged in acts of homosexuality, as reported by Tacitus. The remains of such corpses have been found in Denmark and Northern Germany. The first known Roman law to mention same-sex relations was the Lex Scantinia. Although the actual text of this law is lost, it likely prohibited free Roman citizens from taking the passive role in same-sex acts. The Christianization of the Roman Empire made social attitudes increasingly disapproving of homosexuality. In the sixth century, Byzantine emperor Justinian introduced other laws against same-sex sexuality, referring to such acts as "contrary to nature". The Syro-Roman law book, which was influential in the Middle Eastern legal tradition and especially in Lebanon, prescribed the death penalty for homosexuality. Some Ottoman criminal codes called for fines for sodomy (liwat), but others did not mention the offense. In 15th-century central Mexico, homosexual acts between men could be punished by disembowelment and smothering in hot ashes.

During the late Middle Ages, many jurisdictions in Europe began to add prohibitions of sodomy to secular law. They also toughened enforcement, with vice squads appearing in some European cities. In some cases, sodomy was punished by investigation and denunciation, in others by fines, and in some cases by the burning of the participants or the location where the act had taken place. The death penalty for sodomy was common in early modern Europe. It is unclear how strictly sodomy laws were enforced; one theory is that enforcement was related to moral panics in which homosexuals were a scapegoat. English monarch Henry VIII codified the prohibition of homosexuality in England into secular law with the Buggery Act 1533, an attempt to gain the high ground in the religious struggle of the English Reformation. This law, based on the religious prohibition in Leviticus, prescribed the death penalty for buggery (anal sex).

=== Impact of colonialism and imperialism ===
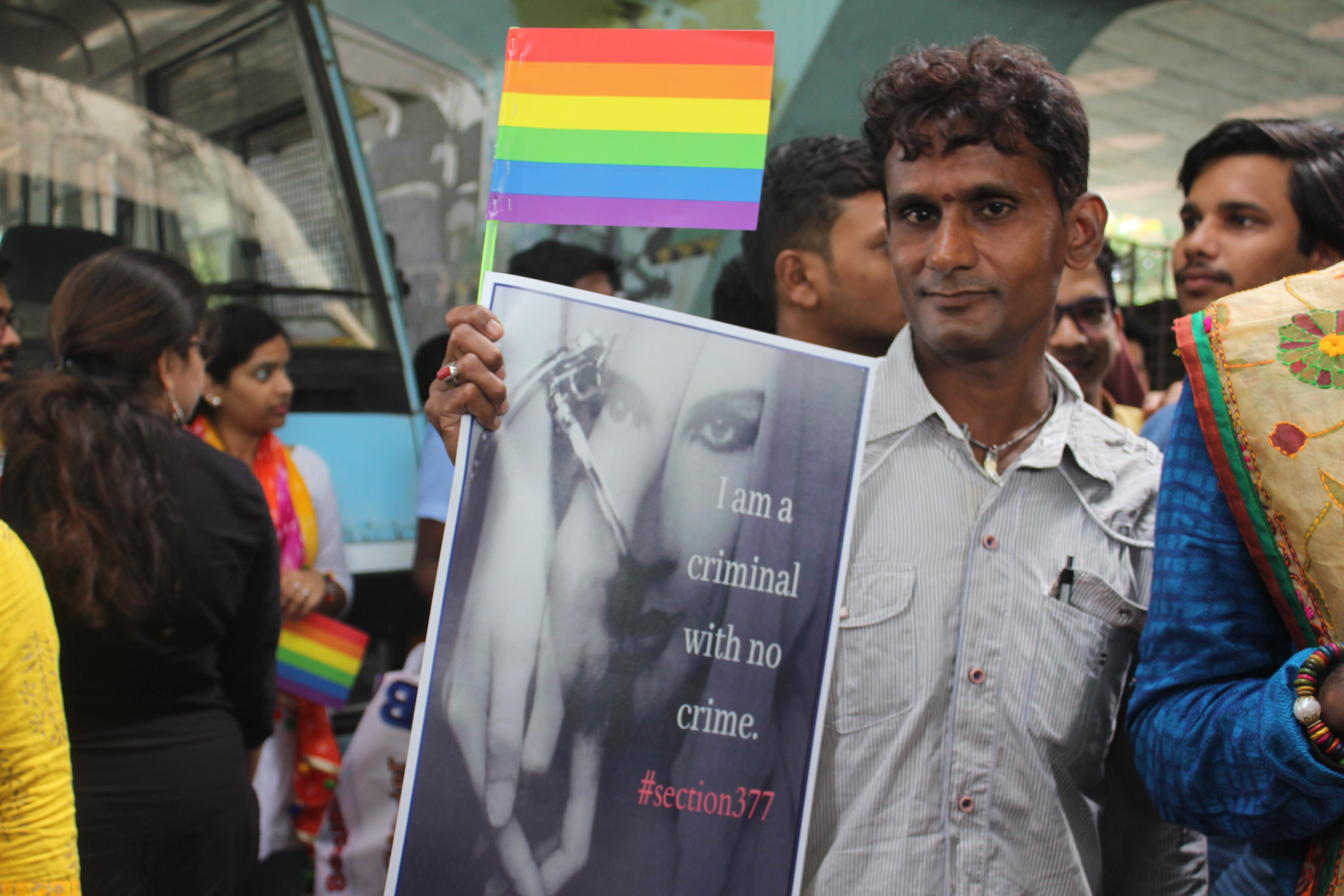
Participant carrying a poster against Section 377 during Bhubaneswar Pride Parade, India

Many present-day jurisdictions criminalize homosexuality based on colonial criminal codes they adopted under British rule. The Indian Penal Code and its Section 377 criminalizing homosexuality were applied to several British colonies in Asia, Africa, and Oceania. The Wright Penal Code was drafted for Jamaica and ultimately adopted in Honduras, Tobago, St. Lucia, and the Gold Coast. The Stephen Code was adopted in Canada (and in a modified form in New Zealand), expanding the criminalization of homosexuality to cover any same-sex activity. The Griffith Code was adopted in Australia and several other Commonwealth countries including Nauru, Nigeria, Kenya, Tanzania, Papua New Guinea, Zanzibar and Uganda, and in Israel. Once established, laws against homosexuality are often maintained by inertia and inclusion in postcolonial criminal codes. Some states adopted British-inspired laws criminalizing homosexuality on the basis of informal influence, while other former British colonies criminalize homosexuality under the influence of sharia law. Both China and Japan, which had not historically prosecuted homosexuality, criminalized it based on Western models in the nineteenth century.

During the French Revolution in 1791, the National Constituent Assembly abolished the law against homosexuality as part of its adoption of a new legal code without the influence of Christianity. Although the assembly never discussed homosexuality, it has been legal in France since then. Previously it could be punished by burning to death, although this was infrequently enforced. The abolition of criminality for sodomy was codified in the 1810 penal code. Napoleon's conquests and the adoption of civil law and penal codes on the French model led to abolition of criminality in many jurisdictions and replacement of death with imprisonment in others. Via military occupation or emulation of the French criminal code, the Scandinavian countries, Spain, the Netherlands, Portugal, Belgium, Japan, and their colonies and territories—including much of Latin America—decriminalized homosexuality. Former French colonies are less likely than British ones to criminalize homosexuality. The Ottoman Empire is often considered to have decriminalized homosexuality in 1858, when it adopted a French-inspired criminal code, but Elif Ceylan Özsoy argues that homosexuality had already been decriminalized. However, some Ottoman men were executed for sodomy including two boys in Damascus in 1807.

The unification of Germany reversed some of the gains of the Napoleonic conquests as the unified country adopted the Prussian penal code in 1871, re-criminalizing homosexuality. In Weimar Germany, the prohibition of homosexuality was not frequently enforced until 1933. In Nazi Germany from 1933 to 1945, an estimated 57,000 men were convicted of violating Paragraph 175. Never before or since have so many homosexuals been convicted in such a short period of time. Thousands of men were imprisoned and killed in Nazi concentration camps. West Germany convicted a similar number of men under the same law but spread over a much longer time period, until 1969, when homosexuality was partially decriminalized.

In the Russian Empire, homosexuality was criminalized in 1835 and decriminalized in 1917 as a result of the Russian Revolution. The criminalization was reinstated in 1934, with a harsher penalty than before, for unknown reasons.

=== Post-World War II decriminalization trend ===
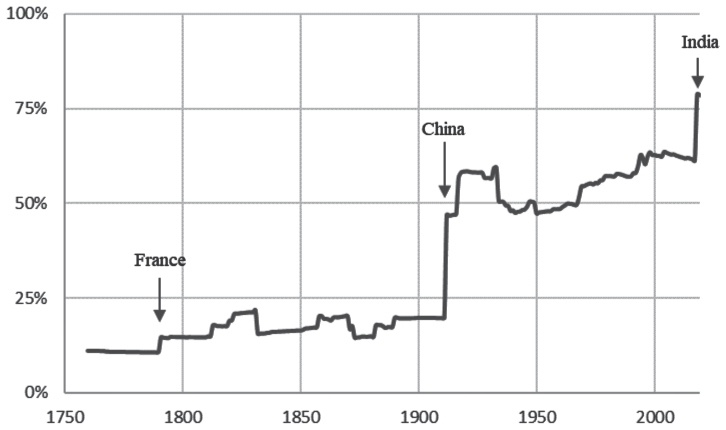
Proportion of the world population living in a country where homosexual acts are not criminalized, 1760–2020 (Note: According to some sources China decriminalized only in 1997.)

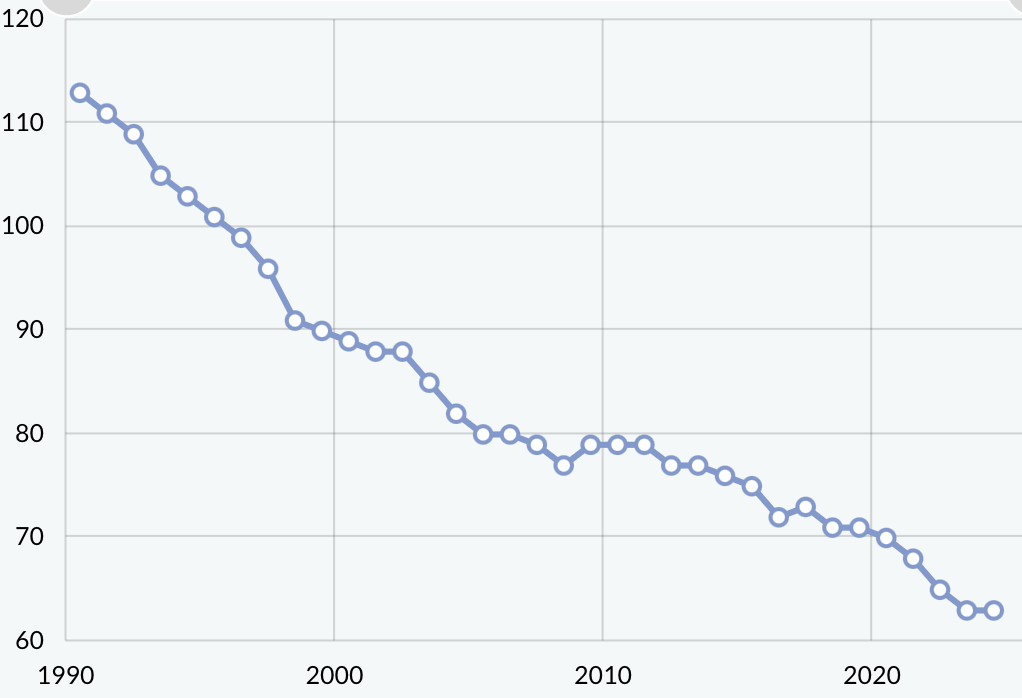
Number of jurisdictions criminalizing homosexuality, 1990–2024

In the decades after World War II, anti-homosexuality laws saw increased enforcement in Western Europe and the United States. During the 1950s and 1960s, there was a tendency to legalize homosexuality with a higher age of consent than for heterosexual relationships; this model was recommended by various international organizations to prevent young men from becoming homosexual. Convergence occurred both through the partial decriminalization of homosexuality, as in the United Kingdom (1967), Canada (1969), and West Germany (1969), or through the partial criminalization of homosexuality, such as in Belgium, where the first law against same-sex activity came into effect in 1965.

There was a wave of decriminalization in the late twentieth century; ninety percent of changes to these laws between 1945 and 2005 involved liberalization or abolition. Eighty percent of repeals between 1972 and 2002 were done by a legislature, and the remainder by the laws being ruled unconstitutional by a court. Decriminalization began in Europe and the Americas and spread globally in the 1980s. The pace of decriminalization reached a peak in the 1990s. Following the dissolution of the Soviet Union, many former Soviet republics decriminalized homosexuality, but others in Central Asia retained these laws. China decriminalized homosexuality in 1997. Following a protracted legal battle, the Supreme Court of India ruled that the criminalization of homosexuality violated the Constitution of India in the 2018 Navtej Singh Johar v. Union of India judgement.

One explanation for these legal changes is increased regard for human rights and autonomy of the individual and the effects of the 1960s sexual revolution. The trend in increased attention to individual rights in laws around sexuality has been observed around the world, but progresses more slowly in some regions, such as the Middle East. Studies have found that modernization, as measured by the Human Development Index or GDP per capita, and globalization (KOF Index of Globalization) was negatively correlated with the criminalization of homosexuality.

=== Resistance to decriminalization ===
Africa is the only continent where decriminalization of homosexuality has not been widespread since the mid-twentieth century. In Africa, one of the primary narratives cited in favor of the criminalization of homosexuality is "defending ordre public, morality, culture, religion, and children from the assumed imperial gay agenda" associated with the Global North. Such claims ignore the fact that many indigenous African cultures tolerated homosexuality, and historically the criminalization of homosexuality derives from British colonialism. In the Middle East, homosexuality has been seen as a tool of Western domination for the same reason.

The application of international pressure to decriminalize homosexuality has had mixed results in Africa. While it led to liberalization in some countries, it also prompted public opinion to be skeptical of these demands and encouraging countries to pass even more restrictive laws in resistance to what is seen as neocolonial pressure. Politicians may also target homosexuality to distract from other issues. Following decolonization, several former British colonies expanded laws that had only targeted men in order to include same-sex behavior by women. Others, especially Muslim-majority countries in Africa, passed new laws to criminalize homosexual behavior. In many African countries, anti-homosexuality laws were little-enforced for decades only to see increasing enforcement, politicization, and calls for harsher penalties beginning in the mid-1990s. The rise of Evangelical Christianity and especially Pentecostalism has increased the politicization of homosexuality as these churches have been engaged in anti-homosexual mobilizations as a form of nation building. While such calls often come from domestic religious institutions, the influence of US conservative Christian groups, who have provided networking, training and funding support, has been instrumental in advancing anti-homosexual discourse in Africa.

=== Current status ===
In 2007, five countries conducted executions as a penalty for homosexual acts. In 2020, the ILGA named Iran and Saudi Arabia as the only countries in which executions for same-sex activity have reportedly taken place. In other countries, such as Yemen, Somalia, Iraq, and Libya, extrajudicial executions are carried out by militias such as Al-Shabaab, the Islamic State, or Al-Qaeda. As of 2020, 21 percent of the world population lives in countries where homosexuality is criminalized. In 2021, Téa Braun of the Human Dignity Trust estimated that more than 71 million LGBT people live in countries where homosexuality is criminalized. In its 2023 Database, the International Lesbian, Gay, Bisexual, Trans and Intersex Association (ILGA) found that homosexuality is criminalized in 62 of 193 UN member states, while two UN member states, Iraq and Egypt, criminalize it de facto but not in legislation. In at least seven UN member states—Brunei, Iran, Mauritania, Nigeria (only northern Nigeria), Saudi Arabia, Uganda, and Yemen—it is punishable by death. Two-thirds of countries that criminalize sexual activity between men also criminalize it between women.

Criminalized Decriminalized 1791–1850 Decriminalized 1850–1945 Decriminalized 1946–1989 Decriminalized 1990–present Unknown date of legalization Never criminalized

== Scope of laws ==
Laws against homosexuality make some or all sex acts between people of the same sex a crime. While some laws are specific about which acts are illegal, others use vague terminology such as "crimes against nature", "unnatural offenses", "indecency", or "immoral acts". Some laws exclusively criminalize anal sex while others include oral sex or manual sex. Some sodomy laws explicitly target same-sex couples, while others apply to sexual acts that might be performed by heterosexual couples but are usually enforced against same-sex couples only. It is more common for men who have sex with men to be criminalized than women who have sex with women, and there are no countries that only criminalize female same-sex activity. This has been due to a belief that eroticism between women is not really sex and that it will not tempt women away from heterosexuality. Unlike other laws, which criminalized specific sexual acts, the British Labouchère Amendment in 1885 and the 1935 revision of Germany's Paragraph 175 simply criminalized any sexual act between two men. Both laws made it much easier to convict men for homosexuality, leading to an increase in convictions.

Penalties vary widely, from fines or short terms of imprisonment to the death penalty. Some laws target both partners in the sex act equally, while in other cases the punishment is unequal. While homosexuality is criminalized country-wide in many cases, in other countries, specific jurisdictions pass their own criminal laws against homosexuality, such as in Aceh province. Most laws criminalizing homosexuality are codified in statutory law, but in some countries such as Saudi Arabia they are based on the direct application of Islamic criminal jurisprudence.

Even in countries where there are no specific laws against homosexuality, homosexuals may be disproportionately criminalized under other laws, such as those targeting indecency, debauchery, prostitution, pornography, homelessness, or HIV exposure. In some countries such as (historically) China and (currently) Egypt, such laws serve as de facto criminalization of homosexuality. One analysis of the United States found that, instead of being directly arrested under sodomy laws, "most arrests of homosexuals came from solicitation, disorderly conduct, and loitering laws, which were based on the assumption that homosexuals (unlike heterosexuals), by definition, were people who engaged in illicit activity". In 2014, Nigeria passed the Same Sex Marriage (Prohibition) Act 2013, criminalizing people who have a same-sex marriage ceremony with five years' imprisonment. Although homosexuality was already illegal, the law led to increasing persecution of Nigerian homosexuals.

== Enforcement ==
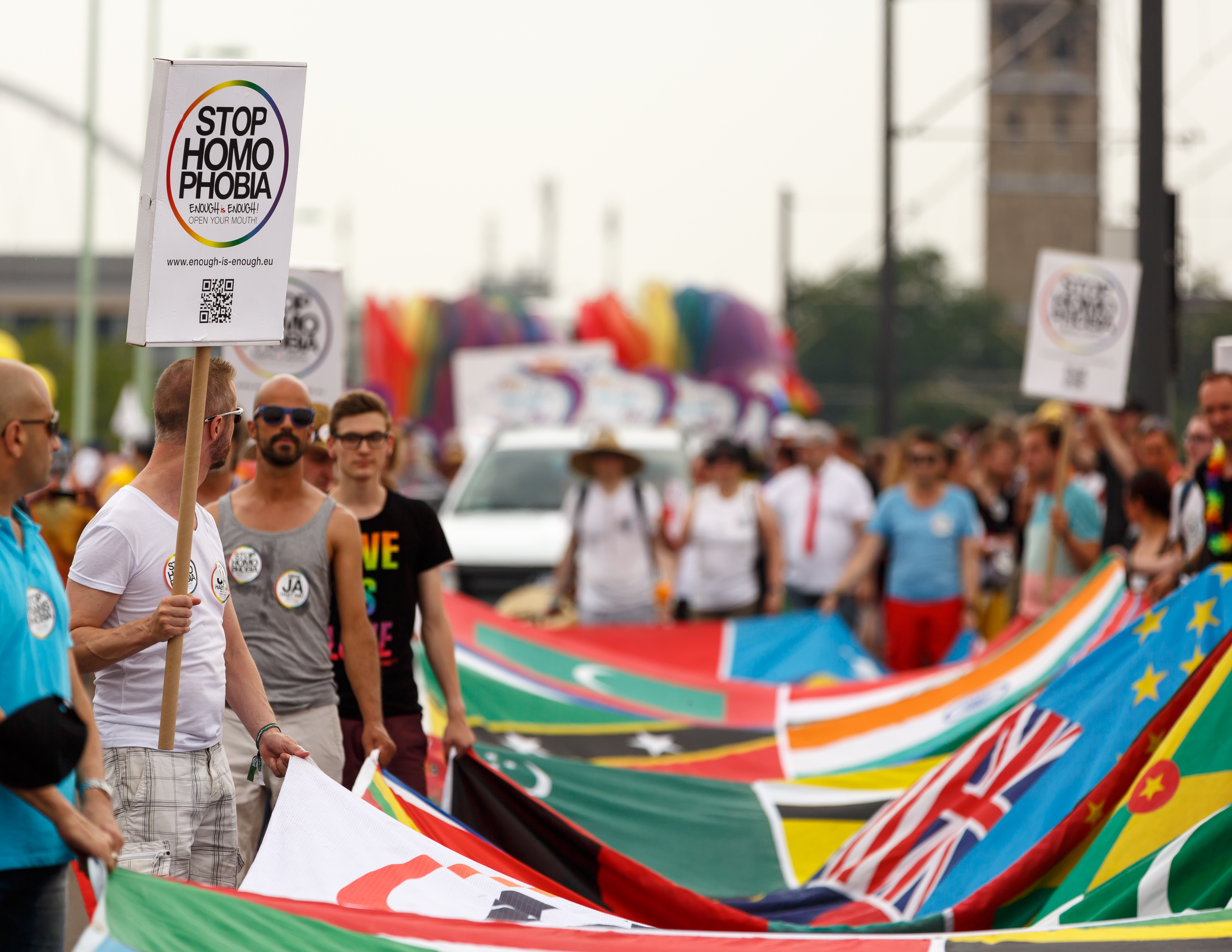
LGBT activists at Cologne Pride in 2015 carrying a banner with the flags of 70 countries where homosexuality is illegal

Laws criminalizing homosexuality are inherently difficult to enforce, because they concern acts done by consenting individuals in private. Enforcement varies from active persecution to non-enforcement; more often than not, laws are nearly unenforced for private, consensual sex. In some countries, there are no prosecutions for decades or there is a formal moratorium.

In Nazi Germany, the site of the most severe persecution of homosexual men in history, only about 10 percent of the homosexual male population was ever convicted and imprisoned. In Iran, the 2013 penal code forbids authorities from proactively investigating same-sex acts unless kidnapping or assault are suspected. In some countries such as India (prior to 2018, when the sodomy law was declared unconstitutional) and Guyana, the laws are not commonly enforced but are used to harass LGBT people. Indian police have used the threat of prosecution to extort money or sexual favors. Arrests, even without conviction, can often lead to publicity causing the accused to lose their job. Those prosecuted under such laws tend to be disproportionately from working-class backgrounds, unmarried, and between twenty and forty years old.

States including Nazi Germany and Egypt commonly use torture to extract confessions from men suspected of being homosexual. In Egypt, possession of condoms or sexual lubricant or stereotypically feminine characteristics are cited as circumstantial evidence that the suspect has committed sodomy. Online dating apps have also been used to identify and target men for prosecution.

Physical examinations purporting to detect evidence of homosexual practices have been employed since at least 1857, when the French physician Auguste Ambroise Tardieu published a book claiming to identify several signs that a person had participated in receptive anal intercourse. As of 2018, at least nine states, including Tanzania, Egypt, and Tunisia, use medically discredited anal examinations in an effort to detect same-sex acts between men or transgender women. There is no evidence that such tests are effective at detecting whether the victim has taken part in homosexual activity. This practice is considered to constitute acts of torture under the United Nations Convention Against Torture.

== Effects ==
The criminalization of homosexuality is often seen as defining all gays and lesbians as criminals or outlaws. Even when not enforced, such laws express a symbolic threat of state violence and reinforce stigma and discrimination. Homosexuals may fear prosecution and are put at risk of blackmail, arbitrary arrest and imprisonment, police beatings, and involuntary medical interventions. The criminalization of homosexuality in some cases pushes LGBT culture and socialization to the margins of society, exposing LGBT people to crimes such as assault, robbery, rape, or murder from other citizens. They may be afraid to report these crimes or may be ignored by the authorities. Such issues lead to severe psychological harm. The laws also justify discrimination against homosexuals—being cited to deny child custody, registration of associations, and other civil rights—and prevent LGBT people from exercising their rights to freedom of expression and freedom of association.

Reactions of homosexuals to the laws range from internalizing stigma to losing respect for the laws and civic community in general. Historian Robert Beachy argues that a confluence of factors including the criminalization of homosexuality meant that a sense of homosexual identity was first developed in Germany around 1900, ultimately catalyzing the first homosexual movement. LGBT movements often developed after the repeal of criminal laws, but in some cases they contributed to repeal efforts. LGBT activism against criminalization can take multiple forms, including directly advocating the repeal of the laws, strategic litigation in the judicial system in order to reduce enforceability, seeking external allies from outside the country, and capacity building within the community. A 1986 study found that the decriminalization of homosexuality in South Australia did not lead to an increase in undesirable effects (such as child abuse, public solicitation, or disease transmission) as claimed in parliamentary debates.

The criminalization of homosexuality has been identified as an exacerbating feature of the HIV epidemic in Africa and Central Asia, because it dissuades many people at risk of HIV infection from disclosing their sexual behavior to healthcare providers or seeking preventative care, testing, or treatment. Criminalization both reinforces societal disapproval of homosexuality, which is another factor in decreasing the effectiveness of anti-HIV efforts and is independently associated with less access to HIV services.

== Support and opposition ==
=== Religions ===
The Abrahamic religions all have traditionally held negative attitudes towards homosexuality. The Hebrew Bible prescribes the death penalty for "lying with another man as with a woman" (Leviticus 20:13). It is disputed if the biblical prohibition was originally intended to prohibit temple prostitution or particular sexual acts between multiple men, particularly those that are seen as compromising a man's masculinity. The total prohibition of homosexual behavior is considered to have evolved relatively late in the Jewish tradition. Some Christians cite various Bible passages in order to justify the criminalization of homosexuality. Although the Holy See officially opposes the criminalization of homosexuality, in 2014 Roman Catholic bishops from Malawi, Kenya, Sudan, Tanzania, Eritrea, Zambia, Uganda, and Ethiopia united to demand criminal punishment of homosexuals, calling homosexuality unnatural and un-African.

According to sharia law, liwat (anal intercourse) and sihaq or musahiqa (tribadism) are considered sins or criminal offenses. The Sunni Hanafi school, unlike other Islamic schools and branches, rejects analogy as a principle of jurisprudence. Since there is no explicit call for the punishment of homosexuals in the accepted statements of Muhammed, Hanafi jurists classified homosexuality as a sin rather than a crime according to religious law and a tazir offense, meaning the punishment is left to the discretion of secular rulers. According to the Maliki, Shafi'i, Hanbali (Sunni), and Ja'afari (Shia) schools, penetrative sex is only permitted within marriage or between a man and his female slave. Otherwise sexual penetration is considered zina, a more serious crime. Zina is punishable by lashes or death by stoning; whether the death penalty is allowed depends on the school, whether the man has been married, and whether he is the active or passive partner. However, the death penalty can only be applied upon a confession repeated four times by the accused or testimony by four witnesses. All Sunni schools, but not the Shia Ja'afari, consider non-anal sex between men to be a tazir offense. In recent times, some progressive Muslims have argued for a new interpretation of liwat (which is never defined in the Quran) to mean something other than consensual homosexual acts.

Adherence to Islam is a major predictor of maintaining laws criminalizing homosexuality and the death penalty for it. The majority of studies have found no association for Christianity. State interference in religious matters, for example religious courts having jurisdiction beyond family law or bans on interfaith marriage, is strongly correlated with maintaining the criminalization of homosexuality. In Africa, anti-homosexual campaigns promoted by conservative Christians, sometimes with support from U.S. conservative evangelical Christian groups, have seen increased law enforcement efforts and the introduction of harsher penalties against homosexual activity.

Under Buddhist religious law, there is no punishment for homosexuality among laypeople. Although harsh penalties are prescribed for penetrative sexual activity by male monks, novitiates suffer less punishment than for heterosexual activity.

=== Arguments for ===
A prominent reason cited for criminalizing homosexuality is the claim, made without evidence, that it could be spread, and that laws against it would prevent homosexuals from recruiting children. This rationale was later proved wrong by scientific research showing that sexual orientation was fixed by a young age. Both Philo of Alexandria and Heinrich Himmler believed that if allowed to spread unchecked, homosexuality would lead to depopulation; therefore, they advocated harsh punishments. The belief that the West is conspiring to depopulate Africa using homosexuality is also a common argument for retaining the criminalization of homosexuality in Africa.

Supporters of paternalism argues that the state can interfere in citizens' private lives to secure a vision of the common good. A common argument is that criminalization of homosexuality is necessary to maintain public morality, traditional values, and cultural or social norms. Anxieties around public morality gained prominence in nineteenth-century Western Europe and North America. Before the medicalization of homosexuality in the nineteenth and twentieth centuries, it was commonly seen as a vice, similar to drunkenness, that occurred as a result of moral degradation rather than being an innate predisposition. Soviet officials argued that homosexuality was a social danger that contravened socialist morality, and that criminalization was an essential tool to lower its prevalence. Some countries have cited the perception that the criminalization of homosexuality would prevent the transmission of sexually transmitted infections, in particular HIV/AIDS, as a reason to keep their laws.

Another reason cited in favor of criminalizing homosexuality is public opinion. The rarity of prosecutions is also cited as a reason not to repeal the laws.

=== Arguments against ===
Criticism of the criminalization of homosexuality began to be expressed by Enlightenment thinkers such as legal philosopher Cesare Beccaria in his 1764 treatise On Crimes and Punishments. Early opponents argued that the laws were impractical to enforce, ineffective at deterring homosexuality, and overly intrusive into private life. For example, Napoleon believed that "The scandal of legal proceedings would only tend to multiply" homosexual acts. In 1898, socialist politician August Bebel highlighted the disproportionate enforcement of Paragraph 175 against working-class German men as a reason for repeal. One argument leading to the decriminalization of homosexuality in countries such as Canada, Czechoslovakia, East Germany, and Bulgaria was that homosexuality was a pathological disease and therefore inappropriate as an object of criminal sanctions.

Another argument cited for the decriminalization of homosexuality is that morality is distinct from law, which should concern itself only with the public good. Based on the work of John Stuart Mill, the harm principle posits that conduct should only be considered criminal if it harms people other than those performing the action. According to this principle, homosexuality should not be criminalized. The 1957 Wolfenden Report, which proposed the decriminalization of homosexuality in the United Kingdom, sparked a famous debate between Lord Devlin, H. L. A. Hart, and others about whether the law was a suitable instrument for the enforcement of morality when the interests of non-consenting parties are not affected. Many of these justifications are consistent with a strong moral condemnation of homosexuality and are disputes over how best to handle the perceived social problem of homosexuality, rather than being based on the inalienable rights of LGBT people.

Another line of reasoning argues that homosexuality is not morally wrong. Utilitarian philosopher Jeremy Bentham wrote the first systematic defense of sexual freedom, arguing that homosexuality and other forms of consensual sex were morally acceptable as they were pleasurable to their participants and forbidding these acts destroyed a great deal of human happiness. In the 1860s and 1870s, German Karl Heinrich Ulrichs was the most prominent critic of the criminalization of homosexuality. His demand for equality before the law and in religion on the basis of an innate, biologically based sexual drive—beginning with the decriminalization of homosexuality and ending with same-sex marriage—are similar to those sought by LGBT rights organizations in the twenty-first century. As a result of social changes, in the twenty-first century, the majority of people in many Western countries view homosexuality as morally acceptable or not a moral issue.

=== Human rights ===
The criminalization of homosexuality is a violation of international human rights law. The European Court of Human Rights found that laws criminalizing homosexuality violated the right to private life guaranteed by Article 8 of the European Convention on Human Rights in Dudgeon v. United Kingdom (1981), Norris v. Ireland (1988), and Modinos v. Cyprus (1993). In the 1994 case Toonen v. Australia, the Human Rights Committee ruled that the criminalization of homosexuality in Tasmania violated the right to privacy and non-discrimination guaranteed in the International Covenant on Civil and Political Rights, even though the applicant was never arrested or charged with violating the law. While Tasmania argued that the law was necessary to protect traditional morals and prevent the transmission of HIV, the Human Rights Committee found that arguments about morals are not insulated from international human rights norms.

In 2014, the African Union's Commission on Human and People's Rights issued a landmark resolution calling for the decriminalization of homosexuality. In 2020, the Inter-American Commission on Human Rights found in Gareth Henry and Simone Carline Edwards v. Jamaica that Jamaica's laws criminalizing same-sex activities violated the applicants' right to privacy, right to humane treatment, freedom of movement, and principle of legality guaranteed by the American Convention on Human Rights. The commission recommended that Jamaica repeal the laws against same-sex activity in order to guarantee the non-repetition of similar human rights abuses in the future. Persecution on the grounds of sexual orientation is a reason to seek asylum in some countries, including Canada, the European Union, and the United Kingdom, although depending on the case the mere existence of criminal sanctions may not be sufficient for an applicant to be granted asylum.

=== Public opinion ===
According to a 2017 worldwide survey by ILGA, the criminalization of homosexuality is correlated with more negative opinions on LGBT people and LGBT rights. Overall, 28.5 percent of those surveyed supported the criminalization of homosexuality, while 49 percent disagreed. In states that criminalize homosexuality, 42 percent agree, and 36 percent disagree, compared with non-criminalizing states where 22 percent agree, and 55 percent disagree. Knowing someone who is gay, lesbian, or bisexual is correlated with less support for criminalization. The number of Americans who agree that homosexuality should be a criminal offense has dropped from 56 percent in 1986 to 18 percent in 2021. Public opinion surveys show that while 78 percent of Africans disapprove of homosexuality, only 45 percent support it being criminalized.

== See also ==
- Discrimination against LGBTQ people
- Human rights
- LGBTQ people in prison
- LGBTQ rights by country or territory
- LGBTQ refugees and asylum seekers
- Sodomy law
- Decriminalization of homosexuality
