= Reparations (website) =

American anti-racist website

- Website type: Compensation for descendants of the Atlantic Slave Trade
- Available in: English
- Creator: Natasha Marin
- Website: diyreparations.me
- Launched: 2016
- Current status: inactive

Reparations is an American website which was launched by Seattle-based artist Natasha Marin in order to allow people with privilege to leverage what they can in order to help people of color. Marin has stated that the website is not about reparations for slavery, which Black Lives Matter has called for as part of its platform; Marin's website, which has failed, is an avenue for people to respond to modern racial turmoil in the United States.

== History ==
In July 2016, Seattle-based artist Natasha Marin launched a social experiment as a Facebook event page. Three days later, the project went viral, gaining international coverage in the Washington Post, LA Times and The Guardian, and expanded to include a website. Framed as a conceptual art project, it was a forum for People of Color to post immaterial or material requests that would improve their lives, and for people of privilege and people who identify as White to offer them contributions and services. A social experiment that was never about “white guilt,” Reparations is a space where Americans, regardless of race, can take ownership of their shared history (NBC News). The project engaged over a quarter of a million people worldwide, some of whom made death threats to Marin. The Reparations project continues to live on through a private Facebook group, “Reparations: Requests and Offerings,” focusing on addressing present-day income inequality, community building, community care, and bringing about much needed healing and repair.

== See also ==
- Reparations (transitional justice)
- Restitution
- Reparation (legal)
- Reparations for slavery debate in the United States
