= Reparation (legal) =

Legal concept

In jurisprudence, reparation is replenishment of a previously inflicted loss by the criminal to the victim. Monetary restitution is a common form of reparation.

== Background ==
In the Basic Principles and Guidelines on the Right to a Remedy and Reparation for Victims of Gross Violations of International Human Rights Law and Serious Violations of International Humanitarian Law, reparation include the following forms: restitution, compensation, rehabilitation, satisfaction and guarantees of non-repetition, whereby

- Satisfaction should include, where applicable, any or all of the following: ..
  - (e) Public apology, including acknowledgement of the facts and acceptance of responsibility;
  - (g) Commemorations and tributes to the victims;
  - (h) Inclusion of an accurate account of the violations that occurred in international human rights law and international humanitarian law training and in educational material at all levels.
- 23. Guarantees of non-repetition should include
  - (e) Providing, on a priority and continued basis, human rights and international humanitarian law education to all sectors of society and training for law enforcement officials as well as military and security forces;

== History ==
The principle of reparation dates back to the lex talionis of Hebrew Scripture. Anglo-Saxon courts in England before the Norman Conquest also contained this principle. Under the English legal system judges must consider making a compensation order as part of the sentence for a crime. Section 130 of the Powers of Criminal Courts (Sentencing) Act 2000 requires the courts to explain their reasoning if they do not issue a compensation order. Arbitral tribunals have held that questions about the proper form and scope of reparation for a breach of an international obligation amount to “legal disputes” under Article 25 of the ICSID Convention.

== See also ==
- English unjust enrichment law
- Holocaust reparations
- Legal remedy
- Reparations Agreement between Israel and West Germany
- Reparations for slavery
  - Reparations for slavery in the United States
  - Slavery reparations scam
- Reparations (transitional justice)
- Reparations (website)
- Restitution
- War reparations
