= Treaty of Artlenburg (1161) =

The Treaty of Artlenburg was agreed between Duke Henry (the Lion) of Saxony and the people of Gotland in 1161. Thanks to its position in the Baltic Sea, Gotland was a very profitable emporium in the 12th and 13th centuries. The Treaty of Artlenburg allowed the Gotlanders special trade privileges in Henry's domains, in return for liberties for Henry's own subjects within Gotland.

== The treaty ==
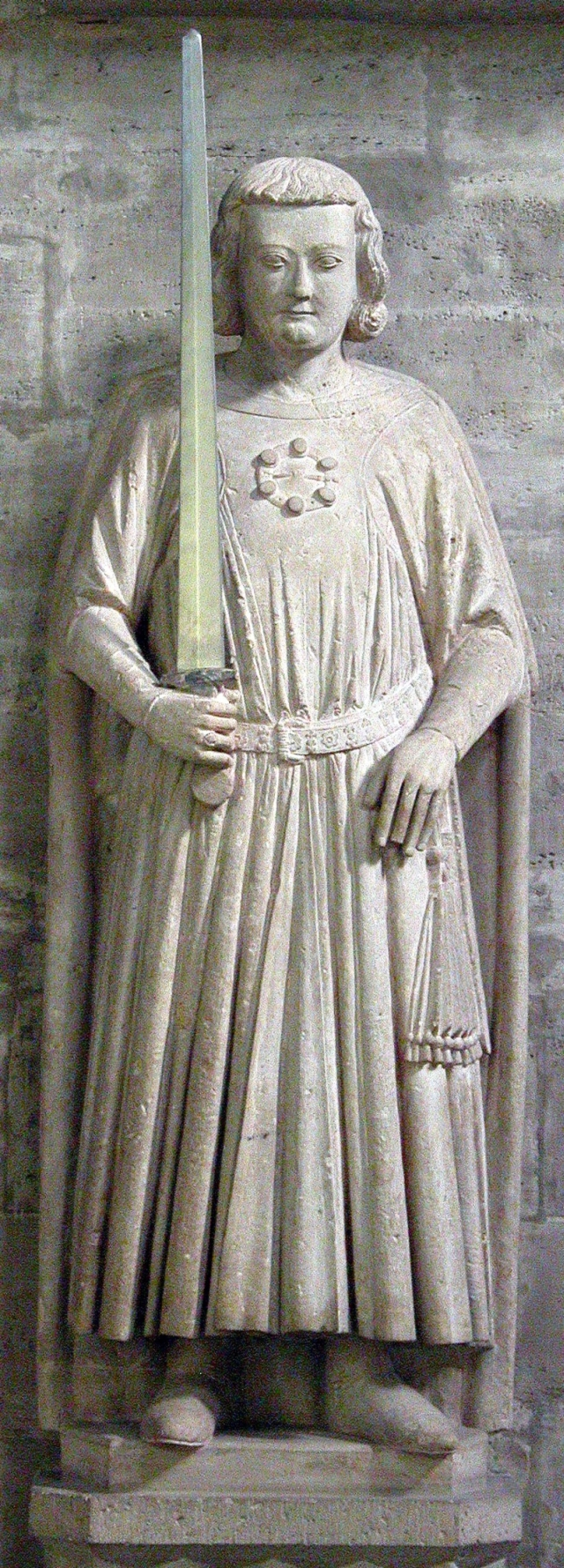
Henry the Lion, Duke of Saxony

The main issues in the treaty detailed how the Gotlanders were to receive full redress (a form of compensation) for injury or damage to any of their goods in all the towns and cities under Henry's authority. The Gotlanders were also to receive other privileges within Henry's domains, including exception from customs and wergild. These benefits may indicate that the people of Gotland had a strong bargaining position, likely due to how influential they were as a trading and seafaring nation.

Though little is known regarding the specific cause behind the treaty, the text mentions acts of violence, referred to as evils (or Mala in the original document). This language is similar to that used in other treaties, often used to describe issues that were believed to be unchristian. The text also indicates that a similar arrangement existed between the Gotlanders and Henry's grandfather, Lothar III.

The treaty's prologue reads:

Henry, by divine benevolent grace, duke of the Bavarians and the Saxons. All present and future faithful of Christ should learn, in their wisdom, how out of love for peace and respect for the Christian religion, but especially out of contemplation of eternal retribution, we have resolved the discord that has long been bad between the Germans and the Gotlanders, stirred up by the spirit of evil, and re-established the ancient unity and concord. And also how we resolved the many evils, namely the hatred, enmities, and murders that arose from the discord of the two peoples, with the helping grace of the Holy Spirit in an eternal stability of peace, and afterwards kindly accepted the Gotlanders into the grace of our reconciliation. We therefore confirm the same decisions of law and peace, once granted to the Gotlanders by the most serene emperor of the Romans Lord Lothar of blessed memory, our grandfather, and we deliver to the Gotlanders in all our reverence for his deeds with the same piety and the tradition of each right … [Translation by Jenny Benham].

The treaty ends with Henry wishing that the Gotlanders will visit his lands frequently, especially the port of Lübeck, which Henry had recently seized from the Duke of Holstein in 1158 and which would go on to become one of the most important towns in the Hanseatic League.
