= Natasha Marin =

Seattle-based conceptual artist, published poet, and activist

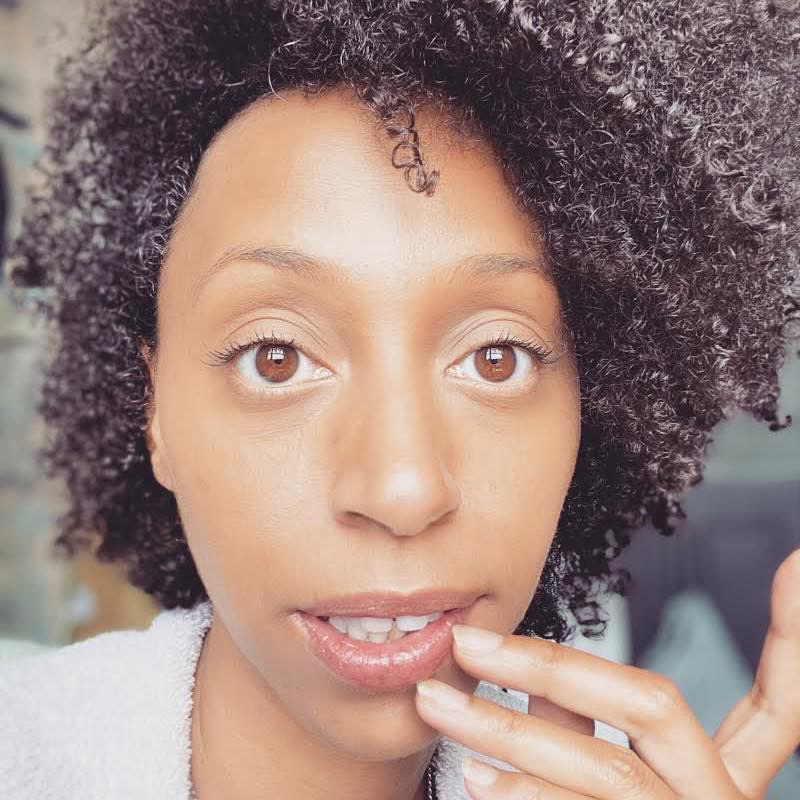
Natasha Marin

Natasha Marin is a Seattle-based conceptual artist, published poet, and activist with roots in Trinidad and Canada, whose work focuses on people, community, and healing. She is best known for her project Reparations (website), for her conceptual art project and book called BLACK IMAGINATION, and for her book “Black Powerful: Black Voices Reimagine Revolution,”.

Marin was listed as one of 30 women who "Run This City" by Seattle Metropolitan magazine in 2018.

== Black Imagination art project ==
Black Imagination is Marin's conceptual art project and book of the same name. The project began with an art exhibit in January 2018 called “Black Imagination: The States of Matter,” at CORE Gallery in Seattle. That exhibition was followed by two more exhibitions under the Black Imagination moniker: “The (g)Listening,” and “Ritual Objects.” Each of the three audio-based, conceptual art exhibitions in and around Seattle were designed to amplify, center, and hold sacred a diverse sample of Black voices.

=== Motherland ===
MOTHERLAND, another in Marin’s Black Imagination series of art exhibitions, was shown at Vermillion Gallery in April 2022. Exploring belonging and displacement, the exhibition included “Cloth Mother,” a sculpture representing spirits and ancestors made of raw cotton, cowry shells, tribal, kente, and Ankara fabrics sourced directly from the motherland. Cloth Mother was created in collaboration with visitors while Marin was artist-in-residence at the Burke Museum.

== Black Imagination book ==
The Black Imagination project also took the form of a book of poetry, reflections, and stories curated by Marin called “BLACK IMAGINATION: Black Voices on Black Futures.” The book was launched at Hugo House in Seattle in January 2020, and published by McSweeney's in February 2020. The book received national attention, with The Paris Review stating, “The thirty-six voices in the book are resonant on their own and deeply powerful when woven together by Marin.” The book was also reviewed in the Los Angeles Review and was recommended by Jason Reynolds on PBS NewsHour. Interviews with Marin about the book were featured on KUOW-FM “Speakers forum: Black voices, origins, and futures,” and on KEXP-FM, “Sound & Vision: Natasha Marin on Black Imaginations,” complete with a playlist of origin stories from the book. The audio version of the book was narrated by Tony and Grammy Award winner Daveed Diggs, and Emmy Award winner Lena Waithe. Gloria Steinem said that she “never experienced an art object like Black Imagination.”

== Black Powerful book ==
“Black Powerful: Black Voices Reimagine Revolution,” Marin’s second book, was published by McSweeney’s in 2022, with cover art by sculptor Vanessa German. The book is a collection of reflections from over one hundred Black voices exploring resilience, joy, and triumphs of Black people everywhere. It was highlighted by City Lights Bookstore in an interview with Marin.
