= Public apology =

A public apology is a component of reparation as stipulated in the United Nations Office of the United Nations High Commissioner for Human Rights resolution proclaiming the Basic Principles and Guidelines on the Right to a Remedy and Reparation for Victims of Gross Violations of International Human Rights Law and Serious Violations of International Humanitarian Law. It is also defined as a restorative process intended to heal and to generate forgiveness on the part of the offended party, for the improper behavior or action of the offender. The process consists in three components: acknowledgment of wrongdoing, admission of responsibility and the action of the wrongdoer to compensate damages produced.

Besides the role of healing and bringing forgiveness on the part of the offended party, public apologies have the function of restoring the health of the social interaction and “publicly acknowledging a shared commitment to some moral values”. According to Cohen (2016) "In order to restore or create moral relations among transgressors and their victims, transgressors …. need to admit their wrongdoing, commemorate or memorialize history, and, most notably, provide an apology."

== Examples ==
- 1995, 2012, 2017: France's apology for the 1942 Vel d'Hiv Roundup, a Nazi-directed raid and mass arrest of Jews in Paris by the French police.
- 2008: Canada's Apology, Statement of apology to former students of Indian Residential Schools.

Stephen Joseph Harper officially apologized to the 80,000 former students of residential schools that had been in Canada. In the 1870s, federal government forcibly sent over 150,000 aboriginal children to residential schools as part of assimilation policy which aimed for eliminating first nation culture and language and let them learn Canadian official language both English and French. While first nation students in residential schools, they did not receive enough amount and quality of housing, food and clothing.

Stephen Harper expressed official apology as follows:

“The burden of this experience has been on your shoulders for far too long. The burden is properly ours as a Government, and as a country. There is no place in Canada for the attitudes that inspired the Indian Residential Schools system to ever prevail again. You have been working on recovering from this experience for a long time and in a very real sense, we are now joining you on this journey. The Government of Canada sincerely apologizes and asks the forgiveness of the Aboriginal peoples of this country for failing them so profoundly.

Nous le regrettons

We are sorry

Nimitataynan

Niminchinowesamin

Mamiattugut.

- 2017: Canada's Apology, compensation to former Guantanamo Child Detainee Omar Khadr.
- 2017: Canada's Apology, Statement of Apology on Behalf of the Government of Canada to Former Students of the Newfoundland and Labrador Residential Schools.
  Justin Pierre James Trudeau formally apologized to first nation student of Newfoundland and Labrador residential schools on Nov.24, 2017. Canadian government forced first nation people to send them to the residential schools for oppressing first nation language including Beothuk, Mi’kmaq, Innu-aimun, and Labrador Inuktituk and their cultures. Justin Trudeau officially admitted that there were frequent physical and sexual abuses against residential students. As a result, Trudeau government offered $50 million dollars for former students who were not included in the apology given by Stephan Harper in 2008.
- 2018: Facebook's Apology, Mark Zuckerberg apologises for Facebook's 'mistakes' over Cambridge Analytica.

== See also ==
- Convention on the Rights of the Child
- Human Rights Day
- International Court of Justice
- Reparations (transitional justice)
- Reparations for slavery
- United Nations Charter
- Universal Declaration of Human Rights
