= Global Reparation Fund =

The Global Reparation Fund is a fund established by the African Union and Caricom that seeks reparations for slavery from their former European colonial powers. It was established in 2023.

The fund was established by the African Union and Caricom at the Accra Reparation Conference, a four-day conference in Accra in November 2023. It seeks reparations for slavery from the former European colonial powers of African and Caribbean countries. It has not been announced how the fund would operate. The fund will be based in Africa.

A draft version of the expected Accra proclamation stated that the African Union would engage with the United Nations to established whether "acts of enslavement against Africans constituted serious violations of human rights at the time they were committed" and that "litigation options" would be explored. The President of Ghana, Nana Akufo-Addo, said at the conference that "The entire period of slavery meant that our progress, economically, culturally, and psychologically, was stifled. There are legions of stories of families who were torn apart ... You cannot quantify the effects of such tragedies, but they need to be recognised". Akufo-Addo said that the "entire continent of Africa deserves a formal apology from the European nations involved in the slave trade" and that "No amount of money can restore the damage caused by the transatlantic slave trade and its consequences. But surely, this is a matter that the world must confront and can no longer ignore". The Secretary General of Caricom, Carla Barnett, said at the conference that "We are at an important inflection point in the global movement for reparatory justice" and that it was critical to "speak with one voice to advance the call for reparations".

Delegates from the African Union began discussions on how to work with Caribbean nations in The Bahamas in July 2023.

An official from the British Foreign Office attended the conference as part of their "standard diplomatic engagement". The British government has resisted potential reparations.

== Reactions ==
The Barbadian ambassador to Caricom, David Comissiong, said that "people feel encouraged by the amount of work that has been done to create a global reparations movement".

The British Parliamentarian Bell Ribeiro-Addy attended the conference and said that the joining of the African Union and Caricom showed that "They’ve sent a very clear message that this is something that can't be ignored any more".

== See also ==
- CARICOM Reparations Commission
- Abuja Proclamation and ARM
