= Intertemporal law =

Law covering applicability of laws over time

Intertemporal law regulates the conflict of laws relating to time. It determines which law is applicable at which time, and specifically the applicability of a rule to the cases that occurred before its creation or entry into force.

== The principle of tempus regit actum ==
Intertemporal law is based on the idea that an action is governed by the law in force at the (local) time of its occurrence. It is therefore irrelevant, for example, that a legal question is only decided by a court at a later point in time, when the previously applicable law is no longer valid.

This principle is described by the Latin phrase tempus regit actum, which can be translated as "time governs the act", meaning that the applicable law is determined by the time of the event in question.

For jurisdictions with multiple time zones, the local time of the action determines the applicable law. In the United States, this principle has been codified in sec. 15 U.S.C. § 262:

"the time shall [...] be the [...] time of the zone within which the act is [...] performed."

=== Exceptions ===
- laws with retroactive effect: An exception to this principle is the retroactive effect of a law enacted at a later date. It retrospectively regulates matters that have already happened and therefore has an effect on past events.
- void laws: If a law is subsequently declared null and void, it can also have no effect on previously concluded facts. This can be the case, for example, if a law violates Radbruch's formula.

== Intertemporal public law ==
Intertemporal public law is particularly concerned with the protection of citizens' legitimate expectations towards the state.

In post-colonial societies, intertemporal legal issues often arise when assessing violations of the rights of indigenous and thus previously rightless citizens. Examples include the question of reparations for slavery and aboriginal titles.

=== Intertemporal public international law ===
Intertemporal international law stipulates that a territory is governed by the laws of the state to which it belongs, for the duration of that state's rule over the territory.

In international law, this principle can be traced back to the Island of Palmas Case, which was decided by Max Huber acting as arbitrator for the Permanent Court of Arbitration in 1928. The decision starts by stating the tempus regit actum principle:

"a juridical fact must be appreciated in the light of the law contemporary with it, and not of the law in force at the time such a dispute in regard to it arises or falls to be settled"

before balancing it by stating that

"The same principle which subjects the act creative of a right to the law in force at the time the right arises, demands that the existence of the right, in other words its continued manifestation, shall follow the conditions required by the evolution of the law."

This creates a tension whereas a "first branch demands that the legality of an act be judged by the law in force at the time the act occurs; the second that we take into account any change in the law over time."

== Intertemporal private law ==
Intertemporal private law regulates the effect of changing laws on existing rights and legal relationships.

== Intertemporal criminal law ==
Intertemporal criminal law discusses the admissibility of retroactive or ex post facto laws.
