= Unenforced law =

Law or rule that is not enforced

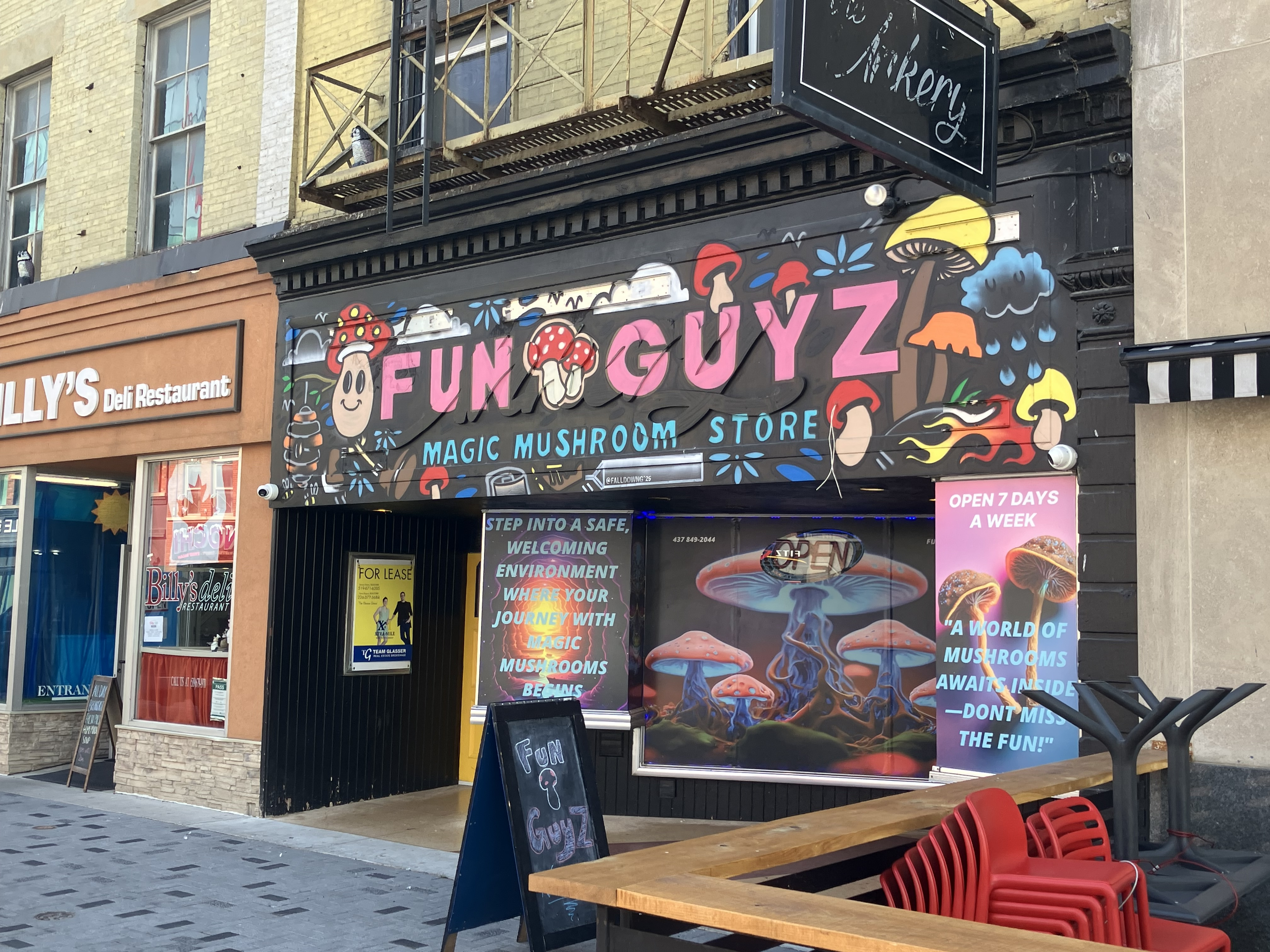
Despite it being illegal to sell psilocybin containing mushrooms under the Controlled Drugs and Substances Act, dispensaries in Canada continue to operate openly.

An unenforced law (also symbolic law, dead letter law) is a law which is formally in effect (de jure), but is usually (de facto) not penalized by a jurisdiction. Such laws are usually ignored by law enforcement, and therefore there are few or no practical consequences for breaking them, thus making them generally meaningless in practice. The existence of unenforced laws has been criticized for undermining the legal system in general, as such laws may be selectively enforced.

== Causes ==
=== Symbolism ===
Unenforced laws may be enacted purely for symbolic reasons, with little or no intention of enforcement.

Symbolic laws typically attempt to persuade rather than enforce, punish or prevent. For example, until the relevant statute was repealed in 2013, adultery was prohibited by law in the US state of Colorado, but no criminal penalty was specified. In Maryland, adultery is prohibited, however the statutory criminal penalty is limited to a $10 fine.

=== Situational enforcement ===
There are also circumstances in which an otherwise enforced law is not; for example, speeding in a motor vehicle is illegal in most jurisdictions, however law enforcement may choose to ignore motorists who only slightly exceed the legal speed limit. Automated traffic enforcement cameras may still issue fines in these circumstances in some jurisdictions.

=== Unpopularity ===
A law may be unenforced because the law is unpopular and the enforcing authority doesn't want to do an unpopular thing. This itself can be due to several reasons, such as: social pressure, the authority's desire to be well-regarded, fear of a popular rebellion, or (where applicable) the authority's impression that jury nullification will render it impossible to get a conviction for the crime (thus rendering attempts to enforce the law futile).

The enforcing authority may also simply dislike the law itself, and choose to exercise selective enforcement or prosecutorial discretion against it.

=== Triviality ===
A law may be unenforced because the law is regarded by the enforcing authority as a triviality that does not warrant the effort of enforcement.

=== Forgottenness ===
A law may be unenforced because the law was enacted long ago and then eventually forgotten about, without ever being repealed.

Sunset laws and desuetude are two different ways that old laws may become formally invalid, thus addressing this problem.

=== Inter-governmental interference ===
==== Legislative ====
Anti-marijuana regulations in the US present another large example of unenforced laws. While Federal Law prohibits possession, cultivation or intrastate distribution of cannabis, the US government generally does not enforce these laws in States which have legalized marijuana products. The Rohrabacher–Farr amendment prohibits the US Justice Department from spending funds to interfere with the implementation of state medical cannabis laws, while also not changing the legal status of cannabis.

==== Judicial ====
Judicial review often can invalidate laws, but (depending on the legal system) there may be no particular duty or process for the laws themselves to be actually removed from the body of laws. In this way, laws may end up on the books but completely unenforceable.

In the United Kingdom, under the Treason Felony Act 1848, it is a crime punishable by life imprisonment to advocate for the creation of a republic in print, even peacefully. The Law Lords' interpretation of the later Human Rights Act 1998, however, has ensured that this law is unenforced, on the grounds that peaceful advocacy of republicanism is protected speech.

== See also ==
- Decriminalization
- Desuetude
- Expressive function of law
- Statute Law Revision Act
- Unenforceable
- Victimless crime
