= Desuetude =

Legal concept

In law, desuetude (/dɪˈsjuːɪtjuːd, ˈdɛswɪ-/; from French désuétude, from Latin desuetudo 'outdated, no longer custom') is a doctrine that causes statutes, similar legislation, or legal principles to lapse and become unenforceable by a long habit of non-enforcement or lapse of time. It is what happens to laws that are not repealed when they become obsolete. It is the legal doctrine that long and continued non-use of a law renders it invalid, at least in the sense that courts will no longer tolerate punishing its transgressors.

The policy of inserting sunset clauses into a constitution or charter of rights (as in Canada since 1982) or into regulations and other delegated/subordinate legislation made under an act (as in Australia since the early 1990s) can be regarded as a statutory codification of this jus commune doctrine.

== English law ==
English law generally applies in England and Wales.

The doctrine of desuetude has been diluted in the common law tradition. The doctrine went into decline from the Middle Ages, when the counter-notion became prevalent that enrolled bill rule existed: the king's assent was required to nullify a clear or settled law; its second limb is similar, stating later acts and other legislation are to be preferred when conflicting. The non-preparatory, constitutional Bill of Rights 1689 clarified the fact of parliamentary supremacy over the executive and any directly conflicting case law. In 1818, the English court of King's Bench held in the case of Ashford v Thornton that trial by combat remained available at a defendant's option in a case where it was available under the common law. Parliament hastily enacted that such mortal combat was illegal; promotors and commentators cited morality including promoting the public good. Similarly the law of residential property distress and of attainder of estates had been little weakened despite widespread judicial displeasure before substantial, required reform via legislation.

== Scots law ==
The doctrine exists in Scotland, being of the civil law tradition, where it can operate as a rare form of repeal. In Scotland, non-use is not the same as desuetude. Disuse must be accompanied by other identifiable provisions that would make the enforcement of the statute inconsistent: neglect over such a period of time that it would appear that a contrary custom had developed; and that a contrary practice had developed which is inconsistent with the law. Regarding the Scottish application, Lord McKay stated in Brown vs. Magistrates of Edinburgh:

Desuetude requires for its operation a very considerable period, not merely of neglect, but a contrary usage of such a character as practically to infer such completely established habit of the community as to set up a counter law or establish a quasi repeal.

== United States law ==
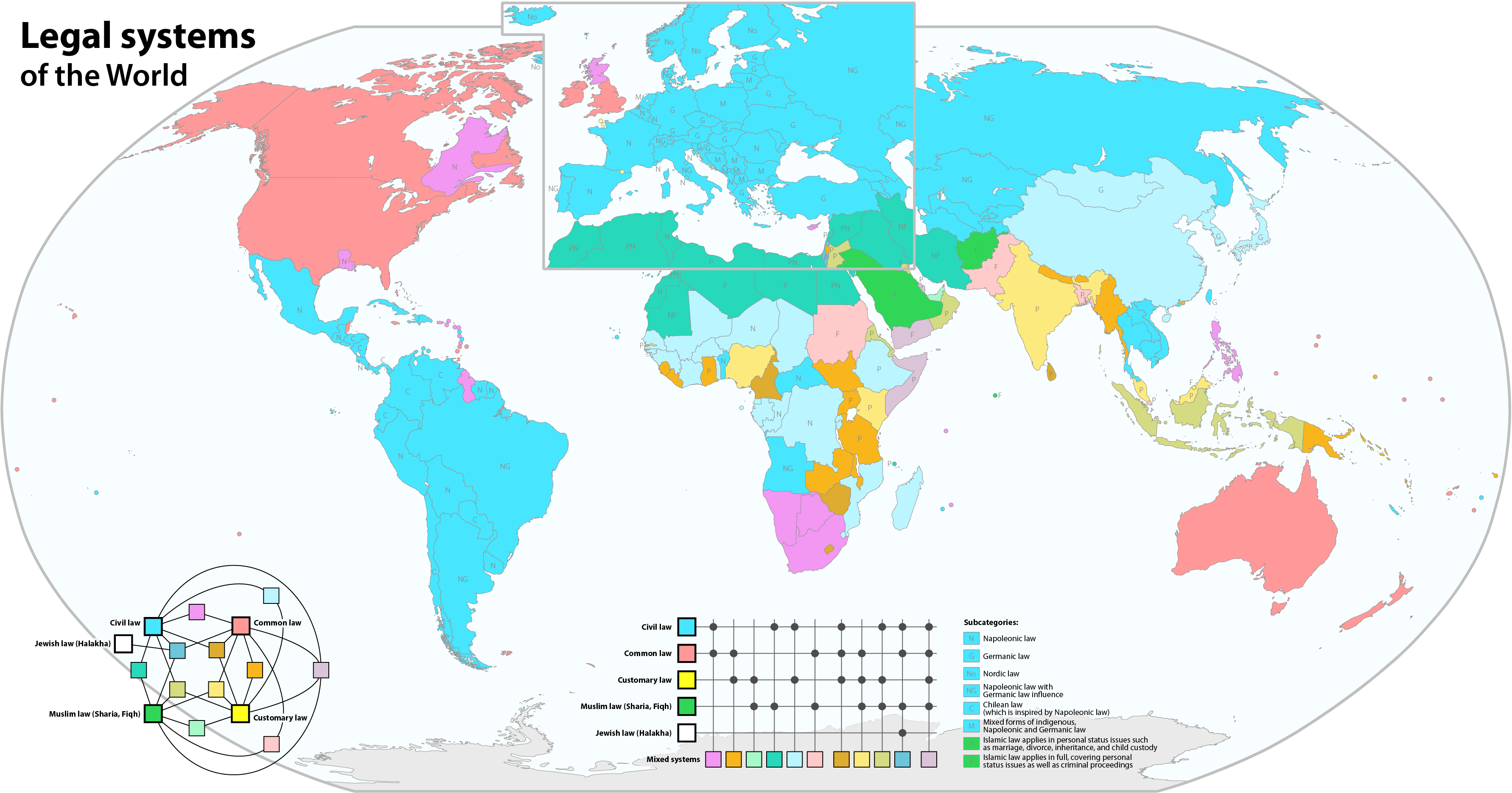
Legal systems of the world. Common law countries are shaded the darker pink.

Desuetude does not apply to requirements of the United States Constitution. In Walz v. Tax Commission of the City of New York, 397 U.S. 664, 678 (1970), the Supreme Court of the United States asserted that: "It is obviously correct that no one acquires a vested or protected right in violation of the Constitution by long use, even when that span of time covers our entire national existence and indeed predates it."

It may, however, have validity as a doctrine in defense of penal prosecution. In 1825, the Pennsylvania Supreme Court declined to enforce the traditional punishment of ducking for women convicted as common scolds, stating that "total disuse of any civil institution for ages past, may afford just and rational objections against disrespected and superannuated ordinances." Wright v. Crane, 13 Serg. & Rawle 220, 228 (Pa. 1825).

The seminal modern case under U.S. state law is a West Virginia opinion regarding desuetude, Committee on Legal Ethics v. Printz, 187 W.Va. 182, 416 S.E.2d 720 (1992). In that case, the West Virginia Supreme Court of Appeals held that penal statutes may become void under the doctrine of desuetude if:

1. The statute proscribes only acts that are malum prohibitum (wrong because prohibited by statute) and not malum in se (intrinsically wrong);
2. There has been open, notorious and pervasive violation of the statute for a long period; and
3. There has been a conspicuous policy of nonenforcement of the statute.

This holding was reaffirmed in 2003 in State ex rel. Canterbury v. Blake, 584 S.E.2d 512 (W. Va. 2003).

Though there is no barrier to prosecutors (or other responsible officials) beginning enforcement of a long-disregarded law anew, the fact that a law has long gone unenforced may present a bar to standing in a suit to prevent its future enforcement. In Poe v. Ullman, the Supreme Court refused to hear a challenge to Connecticut's ban on birth control, writing:

The undeviating policy of nullification by Connecticut of its anti-contraceptive laws throughout all the long years that they have been on the statute books bespeaks more than prosecutorial paralysis ... "Deeply embedded traditional ways of carrying out state policy ..." – or not carrying it out – "are often tougher and truer law than the dead words of the written text."

Shortly thereafter, Connecticut's birth control law was again enforced, giving a plaintiff standing to have it struck down in Griswold v. Connecticut.

== See also ==
- Civil law (legal system)
- Common law
- Holding (law)
- Legal doctrine
- Standing (law)
- Statute Law Revision Act
- Unenforced law
