= Expressive function of law =

Effect of law to create or validate social norms beyond the fear of punishment

The expressive function of law is the effect of law to create or validate social norms beyond the fear of punishment. For example, the criminalization of homosexuality may be maintained in order to express disapproval of homosexuality, even if it is not regularly enforced.

== See also ==
- Unenforced law, a law which is formally in effect, but is usually not penalized by a jurisdiction
- Victimless crime, an illegal act which harms only the perpetrator(s)
