= Island of Palmas Case =

Legal case

Coordinates: 5.55804°N 126.5847°E

Island of Palmas
- Court: Permanent Court of Arbitration
- Full case name: Island of Palmas (or Miangas) (United States v. The Netherlands)
- Decided: 4 April 1928
- Citations: Hague Ct. Rep. 2d 83; II RIAA 829

Court membership
- Judge sitting: Max Huber, sole arbitrator

Case opinions
- Decision by: Max Huber

The Island of Palmas Case was a territorial dispute over the Island of Palmas (or Miangas) between the Netherlands and the United States which was heard at the Permanent Court of Arbitration by arbitrator Max Huber. Palmas (Indonesian: Pulau Miangas) was declared to be a part of the Netherlands East Indies and is now part of Indonesia.

The case is one of the most influential precedents dealing with island territorial conflicts.

== Background ==
Location of the Palmas, with the Philippines as a reference.
Location of the Palmas, with Indonesia as a reference.

Palmas (Miangas) is an island of little economic value or strategic location. It is 2.6 km in north–south length and 1.0 km in east–west width. It had a population of about 750 in 1932, when the case was decided. The island is located approximately 100 miles ESE of General Santos, Philippines, and 70 miles north of the Talaud Islands, the next-northernmost part of Indonesia.

In 1898, Spain ceded the Philippines to the United States in the Treaty of Paris (1898) and Palmas is located within the boundaries of that cession. In 1906, the United States discovered that the Netherlands also claimed sovereignty over the island, and the two parties agreed to submit to binding arbitration by the Permanent Court of Arbitration. On 23 January 1925, the two governments signed an agreement to that effect. Ratifications were exchanged in Washington, D.C., on 1 April 1925. The agreement was registered in League of Nations Treaty Series on 19 May 1925. The arbitrator in the case was Max Huber, a Swiss lawyer.

The question before the arbitrator was whether the Island of Palmas (Miangas) formed part of United States territory (referring to what is now the Philippines) or Dutch territory (referring to what is now Indonesia).

== US arguments ==
=== Right by discovery ===
On 1 January 1906, General Leonard Wood, Governor of Moro Province, Philippines, visited Palmas. According to the Counter-Memorandum filed in the case by the United States, he had already visited the island in "about 1903". The report of Wood to the Military Secretary, United States Army, on 26 January 1906, and the certificate delivered on 21 January by First Lieutenant Gordon Johnston to the native interrogated by the controller of the Sangi (Sanghi) and Talauer (Talaut) Islands clearly show that the 21 January visit relates to the island in dispute. The visit led to the US statement that the Island of Palmas, undoubtedly included in the "archipelago known as the Philippine Islands," as delimited by Article III of the Treaty of Peace between the United States and Spain, also called "Treaty of Paris," and ceded in virtue of the said article to the United States, was considered by the Netherlands as forming part of the territory of its possessions in the East Indies.

The United States, as the successor to the rights of Spain over the Philippines, based its title in the first place on discovery. The existence of sovereignty thus acquired was not merely confirmed by the most reliable cartographers and authors and even by treaty, particularly the Treaty of Münster of 1648, which was agreed to by Spain and the Netherlands. According to the same argument, nothing had occurred of a nature to cause the acquired title to disappear in international law. The United States argued the latter title at the moment when Spain ceded its title to the Philippines by the Treaty of Paris in 1898. Thus, it was unnecessary to establish facts showing the actual display of sovereignty precisely over the Island of Palmas.

=== Principle of contiguity ===
The American government finally maintained that Palmas forms a geographical part of the Philippine group and is closer to the Philippines than to the Dutch East Indies. Thus, the principle of contiguity substantiated the claim that it belongs to the power with sovereignty over the Philippines.

== Dutch arguments ==
The Netherlands considered discovery by Spain not proven and contested the principle of contiguity.

=== Continuous and peaceful display of sovereignty ===
The main argument was that the Netherlands, represented by the East India Company, had possessed and exercised rights of sovereignty from 1677, or possibly from 1648. Sovereignty arose out of conventions entered into with native princes on Sangi (the main island of the Talautse Isles) to stabilize the sovereignty of the Netherlands over the territories of the princes, including Palmas (or Miangas) and this had been validated by international treaties.

== Issues ==
Huber had to determine "whether the Island of Palmas (or Miangas) in its entirety forms a part of territory belonging to the United States of America or of Netherlands territory." Based on the arguments made by both states, there were two main issues:

- Did the inchoate title claimed by the United States prevail over a continuous and peaceful display of sovereignty exercised by the Netherlands?
- Did a title of contiguity have foundation in international law?

== Decision ==
Huber ruled for the Netherlands:

For these reasons

The Arbitrator in conformity with Article I of the Special Agreement of 23 January 1925 DECIDES that : THE ISLAND OF PALMAS (or MIANGAS) forms in its entirety a part of the Netherlands territory. done at The Hague, this fourth day of April 1928. Max Huber, Arbitrator

Michiels van Verduynen, Secretary-General.

=== Right by discovery ===
The United States argued that it held the island because it had received actual title by legitimate treaties from the original discoverer of the island, Spain. The United States argued that Spain acquired title to Palmas when Spain discovered the island and the island was terra nullius. Spain's title to the island, because it was a part of the Philippines, was then ceded to the United States under the Treaty of Paris (1898) after Spain's defeat in the Spanish–American War. The arbitrator noted that no new international law invalidated the legal transfer of territory via cession.

However, the arbitrator noted that Spain could not legally grant what it did not hold and the Treaty of Paris could not grant Palmas to the United States if Spain had no actual title to it. The arbitrator concluded that Spain held an inchoate title when Spain "discovered" Palmas. However, for a sovereign to maintain its initial title via discovery, the arbitrator said that the discoverer had to actually exercise authority even by as simple an act as planting a flag on the beach. Spain did not exercise authority over the island after making an initial claim after discovery and so the American claim was based on relatively weak grounds.

=== Contiguity ===
The United States argued that Palmas was American territory because the island was closer to the Philippines than to the Netherlands East Indies. The arbitrator said that there was no positive international law for the American view of terra firma in which the nearest continent or island of considerable size gives title to the land in dispute. The arbitrator held that mere proximity was not an adequate claim to land and noted that if the international community followed the proposed American approach, that would lead to arbitrary results.

=== Continuous and peaceful display of sovereignty ===
The Netherlands' primary contention was that it held actual title because the Netherlands had exercised authority on the island since 1677. The arbitrator noted that the United States had failed to show documentation proving Spanish sovereignty on the island except the documents that specifically mentioned the island's discovery. Additionally, there was no evidence that Palmas was a part of the judicial or administrative organization of the Spanish government of the Philippines. However, the Netherlands showed that the Dutch East India Company had negotiated treaties with the local princes of the island since the 17th century and had exercised sovereignty, including a requirement of Protestantism and the denial of other nationals on the island. The arbitrator pointed out that if Spain had actually exercised authority, there would have been conflicts between the two countries, but none is provided in the evidence.

Thus, a title that is inchoate cannot prevail over a definite title found on the continuous and peaceful display of sovereignty. Peaceful and continuous display of territorial sovereignty is as good as title. However, discovery alone, without a subsequent act, cannot suffice to prove sovereignty over the island. The territorial sovereignty of the defendant, Netherlands, was not contested by anyone from 1700 to 1906 so the title of discovery was, at best, an inchoate title and does not prevail over the Netherlands claims of sovereignty.

== Customary International Law ==
Under the decision, three customs of international law for resolving island territorial disputes emerged:

- Title based on contiguity has no standing in international law
- Title by discovery is only an inchoate title and cannot supersede the continuous and peaceful display of sovereignty
- If another sovereign begins to exercise continuous and actual sovereignty openly and publicly and with good title, but the discoverer does not contest the claim, the claim by the sovereign that exercises authority is then greater than a title based on mere discovery.

== Inter-temporal rule ==
The decision has also served as a basis for the definition of the inter-temporal rule in international law (tempus regit actum). The rule as enunciated by Huber distinguished between the creation of rights, and the existence of rights:

"A judicial fact must be appreciated in the light of the law contemporary with it, and not of the law in force at the time such a dispute in regard to it arises or falls to be settled."

However:

"The same principle which subjects the act creative of a right to the law in force at the time the right arises, demands that the existence of the right, in other words its continued manifestation, shall follow the conditions required by the evolution of the law."

== See also ==
- Kuril Islands dispute
- Liancourt Rocks dispute
- Senkaku Islands dispute

== Sources ==
- H. Harry L. Roque Jr. "Palmas Arbitration revisited" (PDF). Philippine Law Journal. 77 (4): 437–462.
- William Heflin (2000). "Diayou/Senkaku Islands Dispute: Japan and China, Oceans Apart" (PDF). Asian-Pacific Law & Policy Journal. 1 (2): 9–11 Section III–A, Island of Palmas Case. Archived from the original (PDF) on 2016-08-18.
- William S. Slomanson, Fundamental Perspectives on International Law (6th ed. 2011).
