= Guarantees of non-repetition =

The guarantees of non-repetition is a component of reparations as stipulated in the United Nations Office of the United Nations High Commissioner for Human Rights resolution proclaiming the Basic Principles and Guidelines on the Right to a Remedy and Reparation for Victims of Gross Violations of International Human Rights Law and Serious Violations of International Humanitarian Law. Guarantees of non-repetition are post-conflict measures taken to ensure that systemic human rights abuses do not recur.

== See also ==
- Convention on the Rights of the Child
- Human Rights Day
- International Court of Justice
- Reparation (legal), the legal philosophy
- Reparations for slavery, proposed compensation for the Transatlantic Slave Trade, to assist the descendants of enslaved peoples and the communities affected
- UN Charter
- Universal Declaration of Human Rights
