= Dutch 2022 apologies for slavery =

Dutch apologies for slavery

On 19 December 2022, the government of the Netherlands made its apologies for country's role in the history of slavery. A speech made by Mark Rutte, the Prime Minister of the Netherlands, acknowledged slavery to be a crime against humanity and recognised its lasting impact on society today. The apologies were met with positive response, as well as criticism from the government of Suriname and other parties involved. The Dutch government also announced the allocation of a fund to combat racism in the Netherlands.

== Background ==
On 25 November 2022, the government of the Netherlands announced the date on which the apologies would be issued. Earlier in November, it was said that Dutch apologies for slavery were imminent. The date was criticised by many interest groups, saying that the apologies seemed rushed and that 1 July would have been a more appropriate date. Others criticised the fact that the apology would be made by members of the cabinet, stating that an apology made by King Willem-Alexander was desirable.

== Government fund ==
According to local sources, following the apologies in the speech of the Prime Minister, the cabinet allocates funding towards raising awareness for slavery, improving education on slavery and the opening of a National Slavery Museum. The fund is said to consist of EUR200 million. According to their own website, the government will task a committee with ensuring a proper commemoration.
