= Reparations for slavery =

Social justice construct

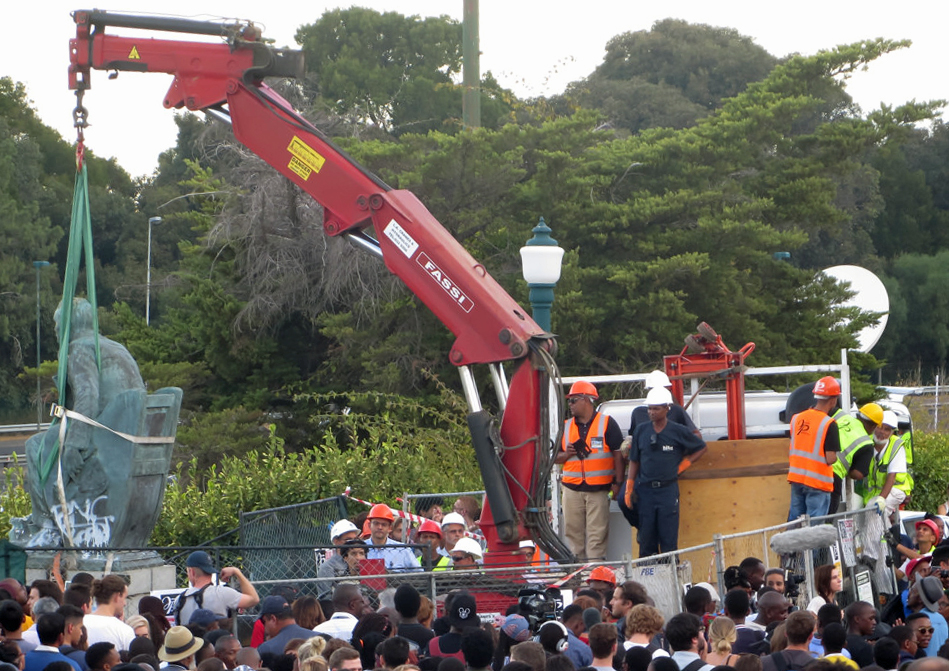
A removed statue of Cecil Rhodes from University Of Cape Town on 9 April 2015 after concerted student protest.

Reparations for slavery are financial compensation, legal remedy of damages, public apology and guarantees of non-repetition of enslavement. Victims of slavery can refer to historical slavery or ongoing slavery in the 21st century. Some claims for reparations for slavery date back to the 18th century.

There are some who argue that there is no case for financial reparations to be made. These include historians, ethicists, politicians and others.

== United Nations resolution ==
United Nations General Assembly Resolution 60/147 refers to measures to repair violations of human rights including restitution and compensation.

== Types ==
Reparations can take numerous forms, including practical measures such as individual monetary payments; settlements; scholarships and other educational schemes; systemic initiatives to offset injustices; or land-based or housing-based compensation related to independence. Other types of reparations include apologies and acknowledgements of the injustices; the removal of monuments and renaming of streets that honour enslavers and defenders of slavery; or naming a building after an enslaved person or someone connected with abolition. Development aid is generally not counted as reparations. Some view financial reparations as insufficient, and demand as reparations for slavery the opportunity to repatriate to their country of origin before slavery and "bringing an end to the current political and economic system".

== By region ==
=== Netherlands ===
In December 2022, the prime minister of the Netherlands, Mark Rutte, apologised on behalf of the Dutch Government for its role in slavery at an event at the National Archives in The Hague, which included representatives of various advocacy organisations. It also pledged to give €200 million towards "raising awareness, fostering engagement and addressing the present-day effects of slavery", and is planning a commemoration of the history of slavery on 1 July 2023, along with Dutch Caribbean nations, Suriname, and other countries.

=== United Kingdom ===
By the 2010s examples of international reparations for slavery consisted of recognition of the injustice of slavery and apologies for involvement but no material compensation. In June 2023, the Brattle Group presented a report at an event at the University of the West Indies in which reparations were estimated, for harms both during and after the period of transatlantic chattel slavery at more than 100 trillion dollars. In October 2023, the UK Reparations Conference was held and a joint declaration issued to the effect that full reparatory justice must be "pursued and achieved".

The formal position of the British Government is that there is no intention to make any monetary payments in compensation for Britain's involvement in slavery or the slave trade. 60% of British people are opposed vs 24% in support of the payment of reparations for slavery.

==== Slave owners' compensation ====
The Slavery Abolition Act 1833 was an Act of Parliament in the United Kingdom that achieved slave emancipation in most of the British Empire. It involved compensated emancipation, as the members of the House of Commons were very mindful of the rights of private property, believing that if an entirely legally held asset could be alienated from one class of person, it set a precedent for other property to be taken by government. The amount of compensation in the Bill presented to Parliament was calculated by civil servants in the belief that it would be considered excessive and reduced, but this did not happen. Slave owners, mortgagees and others with an appropriate financial interest were paid approximately £20 million in compensation in over 40,000 awards for enslaved people freed in the colonies of the Caribbean, Mauritius and the Cape of Good Hope. This represented around 40 percent of the British Treasury's annual spending budget and has been calculated as equivalent to about £16.5bn in today's terms. Some of the payments were converted into 3.5% government annuities, which caused a drawn-out process.

The Act, formally 1 and 2 Vict. 3, was the world's major statute of "compensated emancipation". It empowered the Commissioners for the Reduction of the National Dept to raise the £20 million by issuing government stocks, effective borrowing against future tax revenues to pay former enslaves for the loss of their property.

==== Abuja Proclamation and ARM (1993) ====
The Africa Reparations Movement, also known as ARM (UK), was formed in 1993 following the Abuja Proclamation declared at the First Pan-African Conference on Reparations in Abuja, Nigeria, in the same year. The conference was convened by the Organisation of African Unity (OAU) and the Nigerian government.

In early 1993, British MP Bernie Grant toured the country speaking about the need for reparations for slavery. On 10 May 1993 he tabled a motion in the House of Commons that, the House welcomes the proclamation and recognised that the proclamation "calls upon the international community to recognise that the unprecedented moral debt owed to African people has yet to be paid, and urges all those countries who were enriched by enslavement and colonisation to review the case for reparations to be paid to Africa and to Africans in the Diaspora; acknowledges the continuing painful economic and personal consequences of the exploitation of Africa and Africans in the Diaspora and the racism it has generated; and supports the OAU as it intensifies its efforts to pursue the cause of reparations". The motion was sponsored by Bernie Grant, Tony Benn, Tony Banks, John Austin-Walker, Harry Barnes, and Gerry Bermingham. An additional 46 Labour Party MPs signed to support the motion, including future leader of the opposition, Jeremy Corbyn.

The Abuja Proclamation called for national reparations committees to be set up throughout Africa and the diaspora. Bernie Grant formed ARM UK in December 1993 as the co-founder and chairperson, with a core group including: secretary Sam Walker; treasurer Linda Bellos and trustees Patrick Wilmott, Stephen A. Small (a British academic specialising in slavery), and Hugh Oxley.

ARM aimed:

- to use all lawful means to obtain reparations for the enslavement and colonisation of African people in Africa and in the African diaspora
- to use all lawful means to secure the return of African artefacts from whichever place they are currently held
- to seek an apology from western governments for the enslavement and colonisation of African people
- to campaign for an acknowledgement of the contribution of African people to world history and civilisation
- to campaign for an accurate portrayal of African history and thus restore dignity and self-respect to African people
- to educate and inform African youth, on the continent and in the diaspora, about the great African cultures, languages and civilisations

Following the death of Bernie Grant in 2000, ARM UK became inactive.

==== Class action (2004) ====
In 2004, controversial reparations lawyer Ed Fagan launched a class action lawsuit against insurance market Lloyd's of London for their role in insuring slave ships involved in the transatlantic slave trade. The case was unsuccessful.

==== Apologies ====
On 27 November 2006, British Prime Minister Tony Blair issued a statement expressing "deep sorrow" for Britain's role in the slave trade, saying it had been "profoundly shameful". The statement was criticised by reparations activists in Britain, with Esther Stanford stating that Blair should have issued "an apology of substance", which would then be followed by "various reparative measures including financial compensation". Blair issued another apology in 2007 after meeting with Ghanaian President John Kufuor during Ghana's 50th independence anniversary celebrations. While his remarks again expressed sorrow and described the transatlantic slave trade as a "stain on history", they were still viewed by critics as falling short of acknowledging Britain's systemic role and legal responsibility. Advocates for reparations contended that such language, while symbolic, failed to meet the standards of restorative justice or to lead to any binding policy change.

On 24 August 2007, then-Mayor of London Ken Livingstone publicly apologised for London's role in the transatlantic slave trade during a commemoration of the 200th anniversary of the passing of the 1807 Slave Trade Act. In the speech, Livingstone called on the British Government to pass legislation to create a UK-wide Annual Slavery Memorial Day, which would commemorate slavery.

==== Heirs of Slavery ====
In February 2023, former BBC journalist Laura Trevelyan, whose family had owned plantations in Grenada, travelled to Grenada to make an apology for harm caused and to give reparations. Her family has also apologised to the island nation for harm caused by slavery, and the group has called on the British Prime Minister and King Charles to make a formal apology on behalf of the United Kingdom.

In April 2023, she co-founded Heirs of Slavery, a group of descendants of people who had profited from British transatlantic slavery and want to make amends. Trevelyan's family has donated money towards education schemes in Grenada via CARICOM, and hopes that Heirs of Slavery will bring similar actions on a greater scale. As of May 2023, the other members of the group are David Lascelles, 8th Earl of Harewood; Charles Gladstone, who is descended from prime minister William Gladstone; journalist Alex Renton; Richard Atkinson; John Dower (of the Trevelyan family); Rosemary Harrison; and Robin Wedderburn.

==== Opposition to reparations ====
Opposition to the payment of reparations has come from some academics, such as ethicist Nigel Biggar. He puts forward multiple arguments as to why reparations for slavery and the slave trade are inappropriate, both for the British government and for some British institutions that have made apologies or monetary payment. Included among his points are the following.

British involvement began in a historical context when slavery was common throughout the world. He feels that Britain is being made a particular target by the reparations lobby, when other nations with extensive historical involvement escape criticism. Not least of these are African and Arab slave traders. He sets the origins of the Industrial Revolution in a context where its major influences were not derived from slavery. He points to Britain's early prominence in abolishing the slave trade and slavery, followed by the large and long-term financial, diplomatic and military effort to enforce and extend the ban on the slave trade. He feels that many of the economic problems of former Caribbean British colonies result from bad decision-making by their post-colonial governments, mentioning the efforts made by the British to bolster their economies after emancipation. He particularly challenges decisions by institutions, such as the Church of England, to make reparations based on a misunderstanding of their historical involvement.

Biggar's book has been favourably received by, among others, Indian economic historian Tirthankar Roy, leading historian of the transatlantic slave trade David Eltis and Nigerian author Adaobi Tricia Nwaubani.

=== United States ===
Slavery ended in the United States in 1865 with the end of the American Civil War and the ratification of the Thirteenth Amendment to the United States Constitution, which declared that "Neither slavery nor involuntary servitude, except as a punishment for crime whereof the party shall have been duly convicted, shall exist within the United States, or any place subject to their jurisdiction". At that time, an estimated four million African Americans were set free. There are instances of reparations for slavery, relating to the Atlantic slave trade, dating back to at least 1783 in North America, with a growing list of modern-day examples of reparations for slavery in the United States in 2020 as the call for reparations in the US has been bolstered by protests around police brutality and other cases of systemic racism in the US. The call for reparations for racism has also been made alongside calls for reparations for slavery.

==== Support and opposition ====
Within the political sphere, a bill demanding slavery reparations has been proposed at the national level, the "Commission to Study and Develop Reparation Proposals for African-Americans Act", which former Rep. John Conyers Jr. (D-MI) reintroduced to the United States Congress every year from 1989 until his resignation in 2017. As its name suggests, the bill recommended the creation of a commission to study the "impact of slavery on the social, political and economic life of our nation"; however, there are cities and institutions that have initiated reparations in the US (see § Legislation and other actions for a list).

In 1999, African-American lawyer and activist Randall Robinson, founder of the TransAfrica advocacy organization, wrote that America's history of race riots, lynching, and institutional discrimination have "resulted in $1.4 trillion in losses for African Americans". Economist Robert Browne stated that, the ultimate goal of reparations should be to "restore the black community to the economic position it would have if it had not been subjected to slavery and discrimination". He estimates a fair reparation value anywhere between $1.4 to $4.7 trillion, or roughly $142,000 (equivalent to $193,000 in 2025) for every black American living today. Other estimates range from $5.7 to $14.2 and $17.1 trillion.

Opposition to slavery reparations is reflected in the general population. In a study conducted by YouGov in 2014, only 37% of Americans believed that enslaved people should have been provided compensation in the form of cash after being freed. Furthermore, only 15% believed that descendants of enslaved people should receive cash payments. The findings indicated a clear divide between black and white Americans. The study summarized its findings: "Only 6% of white Americans support cash payments to the descendants of slaves, compared to 59% of black Americans. Similarly, only 19% of whites – and 63% of blacks – support special education and job training programs for the descendants of slaves."

In 2014, American journalist Ta-Nehisi Coates published an article titled "The Case for Reparations", which discussed the continued effects of slavery and Jim Crow laws and made renewed demands for reparations. Coates refers to Rep. John Conyers Jr.'s H.R.40 Bill, pointing out that Congress's failure to pass this bill expresses a lack of willingness to right their past wrongs. In response to the article, conservative journalist Kevin D. Williamson published an article titled "The Case Against Reparations". In it, Williamson argues: "The people to whom reparations are owed are long dead."

In September 2016, the United Nations' Working Group of Experts on People of African Descent encouraged Congress to pass H.R. 40 to study reparations proposals. Still, the Working Group did not directly endorse any specific reparations proposal. The report noted that there exists a legacy of racial inequality in the United States, and explained that "Despite substantial changes since the end of the enforcement of Jim Crow and the fight for civil rights, ideology ensuring the domination of one group over another, continues to negatively impact the civil, political, economic, social and cultural rights of African Americans today." The report notes that, a "dangerous ideology of systemic racism inhibits social cohesion among the US population".

The topic of reparations gained renewed attention in 2020 as the Black Lives Matter movement named reparations as one of their policy goals in the United States.

In 2020, rapper T.I. supported reparations that would give every African American US$1 million and asserted that slavery caused mass incarcerations, poverty, and other ills.

=== Caribbean ===
From the perspective of international law, it is questionable whether slavery, genocide, and other crimes against humanity had been outlawed at the time they were committed in the Caribbean; for example, "Although the factual appearance of genocide can be traced back at least to ancient times, its prohibition by international law appears to be a phenomenon of the early 20th century". Additionally, according to internationally established customs, a successor government is responsible for providing reparative justice.

Under the international principle of intertemporal law, today's prohibitions cannot be applied retroactively. There is a legal argument suggesting that, exceptions to intertemporal law apply in cases of crimes against humanity, as European states and their representatives could not expect slavery to be legal in the future (referred to as teleological reduction of the principle). However, it is a complex area of law.

==== CARICOM Reparations Commission ====
The Caribbean Community (CARICOM), established in 1973, is an intergovernmental organisation that is a political and economic union of 15 member states throughout the Caribbean. Until 1995, it comprised only the English-speaking parts of the Caribbean, until the addition of Suriname (Dutch) in 1995; Haiti and other non-Anglophone nations have since joined.

In 2013, in the first of a series of lectures in Georgetown, Guyana, to commemorate the 250th anniversary of the 1763 Berbice Slave Revolt, Principal of the Cave Hill Campus of the University of the West Indies, Sir Hilary Beckles urged the CARICOM countries to emulate the position adopted by the Jews who were persecuted during the Second World War and have since organized a Jewish reparations fund. Following Beckles' advice, the CARICOM Reparations Commission was created in September 2013. In 2014, 15 Caribbean nations unveiled the "CARICOM Ten Point Plan for Reparatory Justice", which spelled out demands for reparations from Europe ...for the enduring suffering inflicted by the Atlantic slave trade". Among these demands were formal apologies from all nations involved (as opposed to "statements of regret"), repatriation of displaced Africans to their homeland, programs to help Africans learn about and share their histories, and institutions to improve slavery descendants' literacy, physical health, and psychological health. Representatives of Caribbean states have repeatedly announced their intention to bring the issue to the International Court of Justice (ICJ).

==== Antigua and Barbuda ====
In 2011, Antigua and Barbuda called for reparations at the United Nations, saying "that segregation and violence against people of African descent had impaired their capacity for advancement as nations, communities and individuals". More recently, in 2016, Ambassador of Antigua and Barbuda to the United States, Sir Ronald Sanders, called on Harvard University "to demonstrate its remorse and its debt to unnamed slaves from Antigua and Barbuda". According to Sanders, Isaac Royall Jr., who was the first endowed professor of law at Harvard, relied on the slaves on his plantation in Antigua when establishing Harvard Law School. Sanders recommended these reparations come in the form of annual scholarships for Antiguans and Barbudans.

==== Barbados ====
In 2012, the Barbadian government established a twelve-member Reparations Task Force to sustain the local, regional, and international momentum for reparations. Barbados was then leading the way in "calling for reparations from former colonial powers for the injustices suffered by slaves and their families".

Barbados was said to be "leading the way" (as of 2021) in calling for the payment of reparations for slavery.

As of January 2023, the Barbados National Task Force on Reparations, part of the CARICOM Reparations Commission, is seeking reparations from wealthy British MP Richard Drax for his ancestors' involvement in slavery. The Drax family still owns a large estate in Barbados; Richard Drax is said to be worth "at least £150m". If the Commission's request to return Drax Hall to Barbados is refused, the government intended as of January 2023 to take the matter to international arbitration.

==== Guyana ====
In 2007, Guyana President Bharrat Jagdeo formally called on European nations to pay reparations for the slave trade. President Jagdeo stated: "Although some members of the international community have recognized their active role in this despicable system, they need to go step further and support reparations." In 2014, the Parliament of Guyana established a "Reparations Committee of Guyana" to further investigate the impact of slavery and create formal demands for reparations.

==== Haiti ====
Having attained its independence from France in 1804 through a brutal and costly war, the case for reparations to Haiti was tenable. Shortly after that, France would demand that the newly founded Haiti pay the French government and enslavers 90 million francs for the "theft" of the enslaved people's own lives (compensated emancipation) and the land that they had turned into profitable sugar and coffee-producing plantations to recognize the fledgling nation's independence formally. French banks and Citibank financed this debt and finally paid off in 1947.

In 2003, then-President of Haiti Jean-Bertrand Aristide demanded that France compensate Haiti for more than US$21 billion, the modern equivalent of the 90 million gold francs Haiti was forced to pay to gain international recognition. Aristide later accused France and the United States of overthrowing him in a successful coup d'état: he claimed that they did this in retaliation for his demands.

==== Jamaica ====
In 2004, a coalition of Jamaican activists, including Rastafari members, demanded that European nations that had participated in the slave trade should fund the resettlement of 500,000 Rastafari in Ethiopia (which they estimated to be 72.5 billion pound sterling, or roughly, $150,000 per person). The British government rejected the demand.

In 2012, the Jamaican Government revived its reparations commission to consider whether the country should seek an apology or reparations from Britain for its role in the slave trade. The opposition cited Britain's role in abolishing the slave trade as a reason that Britain should issue no reparations. In 2021, the Jamaican government again revisited the idea of reparations for slavery. It was reported that the Jamaican government was seeking some 7 billion pounds sterling in reparations for the damages of slavery, including the 20,000,000 paid out to former enslavers by the British government.

=== Muslim world ===
Reparations for historical slavery in the Muslim world were proposed.

== By region of origin of slaves ==
=== Africa ===
In 1999, the African World Reparations and Repatriation Truth Commission called for the West to pay $777 trillion (~$1.41 quadrillion in 2025) to Africa within five years.

In September 2001, the United Nations sponsored the World Conference against Racism, Racial Discrimination, Xenophobia and Related Intolerance held in Durban, South Africa. The Durban Review Conference sponsored a resolution stating that the West owed reparations to Africa due to the "racism, racial discrimination, xenophobia, and related intolerance" that the Atlantic slave trade caused. Leaders of several African nations supported this resolution. The former Minister of Justice of Sudan, Ali Mohamed Osman Yassin, stated that the slave trade is responsible for Africa's current problems.

President Cyril Ramaphosa supports reparations for slavery and the slave trade, marking the 20th anniversary of the Durban declaration.

==== African Union and Caricom Global Reparation Fund ====
A Global Reparation Fund was established by the African Union and Caricom at a conference in Ghana in November 2023. The President of Ghana, Nana Akufo-Addo, said at the conference that "The entire period of slavery meant that our progress, economically, culturally, and psychologically, was stifled. There are legions of stories of families who were torn apart ... You cannot quantify the effects of such tragedies, but they need to be recognised".

== See also ==
- Reparations Agreement between Israel and West Germany (1952)
- Restitution
- Legal remedy
- Reparations (transitional justice)
- Right to an effective remedy
- Slavery reparations scam
- War reparations
