= Slavery reparations scam =

Tax fraud related to reparations for slavery

The "Slave Reparations Act" (also called the Slavery Reparation Tax Credit, Black Tax Credit or Black Inheritance Tax Refund) is a tax fraud related to the concept of reparations for slavery. The scam claims that filers can receive $5,000 or increased social security payouts for African Americans born in the United States between 1911 and 1926.

It claims that African Americans are entitled to a $5,000 slavery reparation tax credit. Below is a sample solicitation:

BORN PRIOR TO THE YEAR OF 1928 AND OF THE BLACK ETHNIC RACE?

DO YOU KNOW ANYONE WHO WAS BORN UP UNTIL 1927? DID YOU KNOW THAT THE GOVERNMENT IS REFUNDING MONIES TO ANYONE ALIVE THAT WAS BORN UP UNTIL THE YEAR OF 1927 DUE TO THE SLAVE REPARATION ACT? FOR INFORMATION CONTACT:

(Scammer's name and address redacted)

PROVIDE THEM WITH THE FOLLOWING INFO AND AN APPLICATION WILL BE MAILED TO YOU FOR THE ISSUANCE OF A $5000.00 CHECK WHICH CAN BE EITHER ATTACHED TO YOUR SOCIAL SECURITY CHECK OR ISSUED IN ONE LUMP SUM:

NAME
ADDRESS
PHONE#
SOCIAL SECURITY
DATE OF BIRTH

The goal of the scam is to get the victim to send all of their information to the scammer. By doing this, the scammer will gain the ability to commit identity theft on the victim.

This scam may have resulted from unpassed congressional legislation in 1999 to explore slave reparations. The bill, H.R. 40, would have created a commission to study the possibility of actual reparations to slave families.

Another payout quotes $43,209 (~$706,305 in 2023) as the estimated value of "40 acres and a mule," supposedly laid out in an 1866 bill that was passed by Congress but was vetoed by President Andrew Johnson. No such bill was entered into Congress in 1866. It is based on an actual order by Union General William Tecumseh Sherman, Special Field Order No. 15, that set aside land from Charleston, South Carolina to Jacksonville, Florida for the exclusive use of freed slaves. Each family would receive 40 acres (160,000 m^{2}) from this holding. Sherman may have acted on his own authority. No record exists of President Abraham Lincoln or the War Department authorizing this action.

The Freedmen's Bureau controlled over 850,000 acres (3,400 km^{2}) of confiscated land in 1865, and many of its officials intended to settle blacks on it. As President Johnson began to restore property to former Confederates, commissioner Oliver Otis Howard issued Circular 13. The document, put out in July, ordered rapid establishment of forty-acre plots in violation of presidential pardons.

In response to Sherman's precedent and Howard's instructions, the White House issued Howard's Circular 15 in September 1865 ordering restoration of land to pardoned owners and taking them back from freed slaves who had received them under Special Field Order No. 15.

The Southern Homestead Act of 1866 did make public land in some states available to freed slaves. Most of this land was swampy or distant from travel routes or was claimed by lumber companies.

In April 2002, the Internal Revenue Service (IRS) received more than 100,000 attempts to claim reparation tax credits and paid out more than $30 million (~$48.6 million in 2023) in erroneous refunds. The IRS continued to report false tax credit scams and claims in 2003 and 2004.

== See also ==
- Affinity fraud
