= Bhubaneswar Pride Parade =

Odisha's first Pride Parade

Bhubaneswar, the capital city of Odisha, India, held its first Pride Parade on 27 June 2009. Since then Pride has happened in 2010 and then again in 2018. Hundreds of people from Bhubaneshwar, Cuttack and other parts of Odisha take to the streets to celebrate the city's LGBTQ+ Pride Parades.

== History ==
=== 2009 ===
Bhubaneswar's first queer Pride parade was held on 27 June 2009. It was jointly organised by Sakha, Institute for Development Programmes and Research (IDPR), and SAATHII. The event included keynote addresses by community members, government officials and NGO representatives, a documentary screening, street theatre performances, a public meeting at walk end-point; and concluded with a candle light vigil.

=== 2010 ===
On 3 July 2010, Bhubaneswar had its second Rainbow Pride walk that included a solidarity event and candlelight vigil. It was organised by Sampark, a coalition of community based organisations working on LGBTI and HIV issues. The event was covered by travel bloggers.

=== 2018 ===
1 September 2018 marked the third time that the city of Bhubaneshwar witnessed a queer Pride parade. The 2018 Bhubaneshwar Pride was put together by three organisations – SAATHII, an NGO working for the cause of HIV-AIDS care and LGBTIQ rights, Sakha, which is run by Meera Parida and is an indigenous trans collective that has been supported by the Odisha government, and The Parichay Collective, an LGBQ community in Odisha. The Pride organisers said that a Pride march was essential to foster a spirit of community and visibility for the queer community in Odisha, where tier II cities like Bhubaneshwar did not display much awareness about the LGBTQ+ community. The focus of the Pride was not just visibility, but also intersectionality and inclusion. An organiser was quoted as saying, "This Pride will not only address the LGBTQIA problems but also the general constructs of the society like shame, untouchability, class bias and sex discrimination within and outside the community and the majority deciding what is best for minorities."

The 2018 Bhubaneshwar Pride also had the distinction of being the last Pride March in India that demanded the overhaul of Section 377 – the law criminalising "unnatural sex", as Section 377 was scrapped in a historic judgment by the Supreme Court of India just a few days later, on 6 September 2018.

== Gallery ==
Bhubaneswar Pride Parade 2018

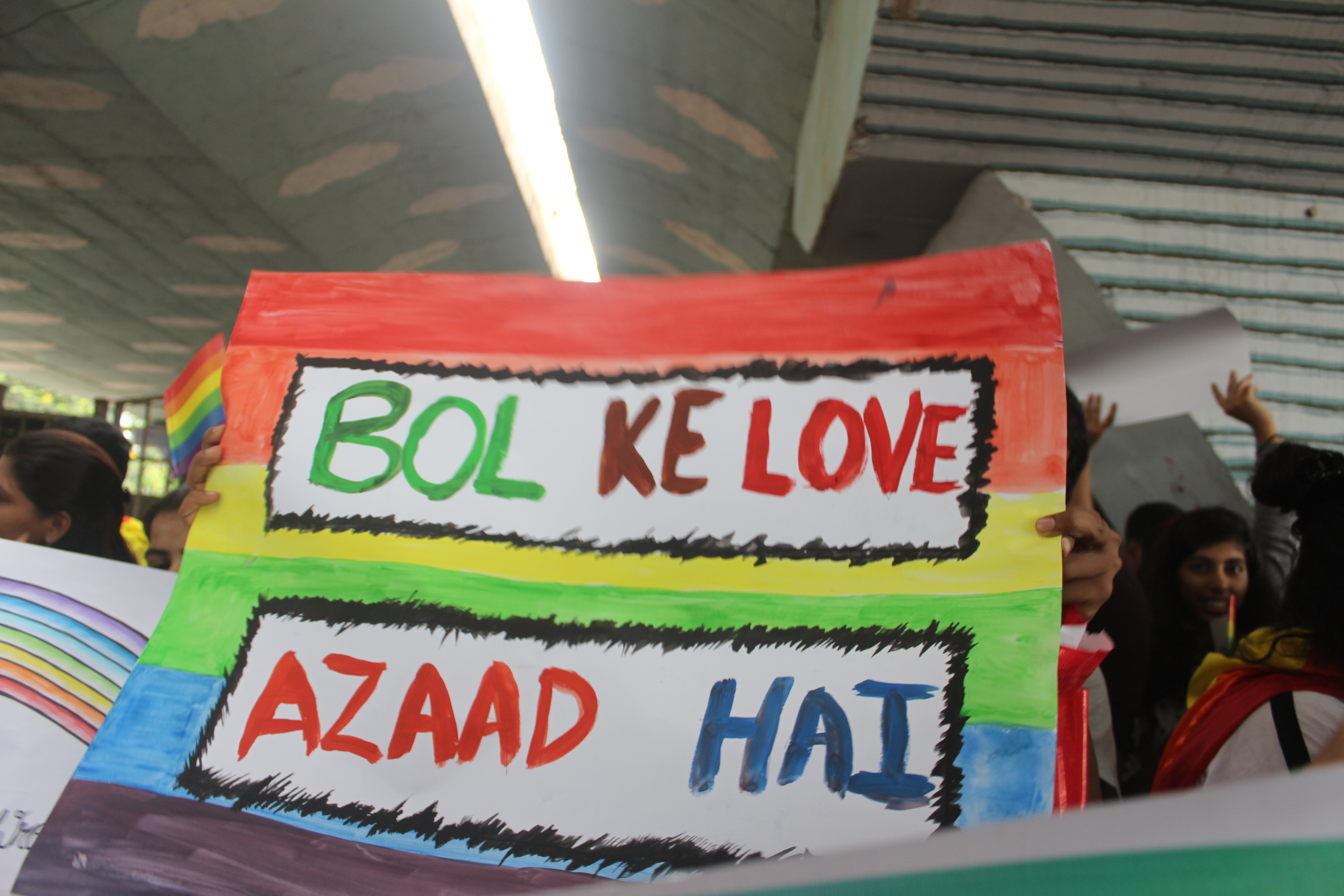
Participants of 2018 Bhubaneswar Pride Parade

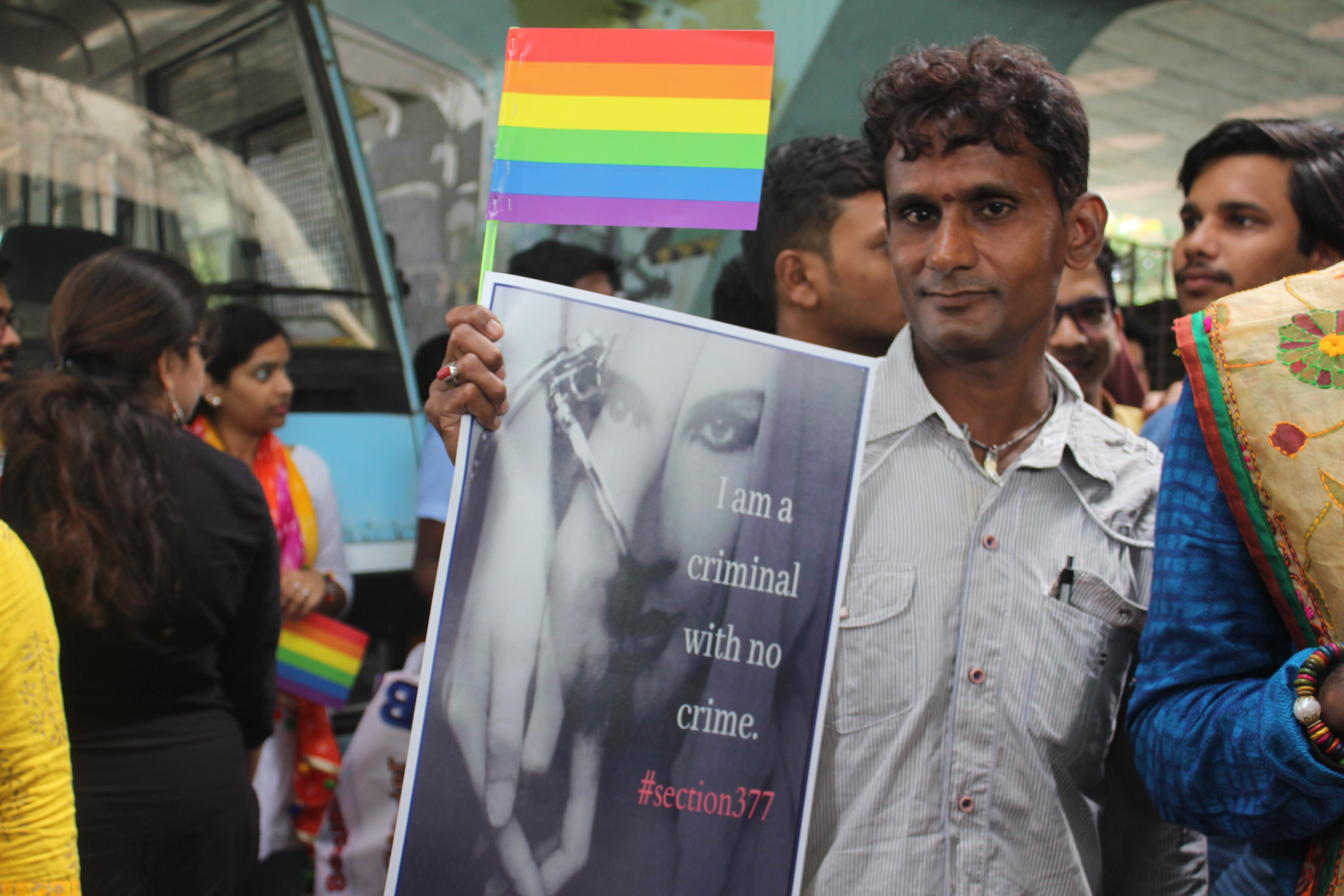
Participants of 2018 Bhubaneswar Pride Parade

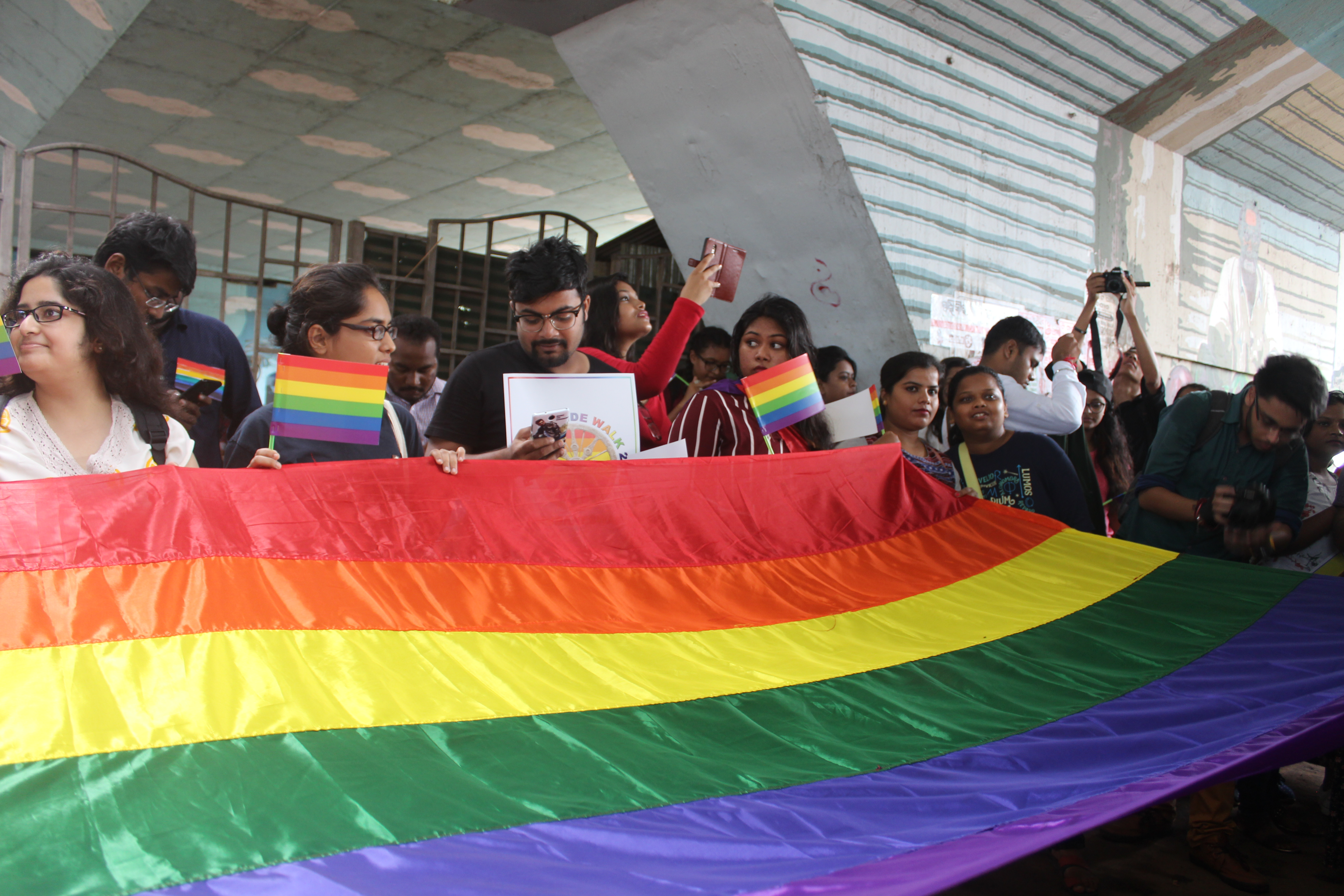
Participants of 2018 Bhubaneswar Pride Parade

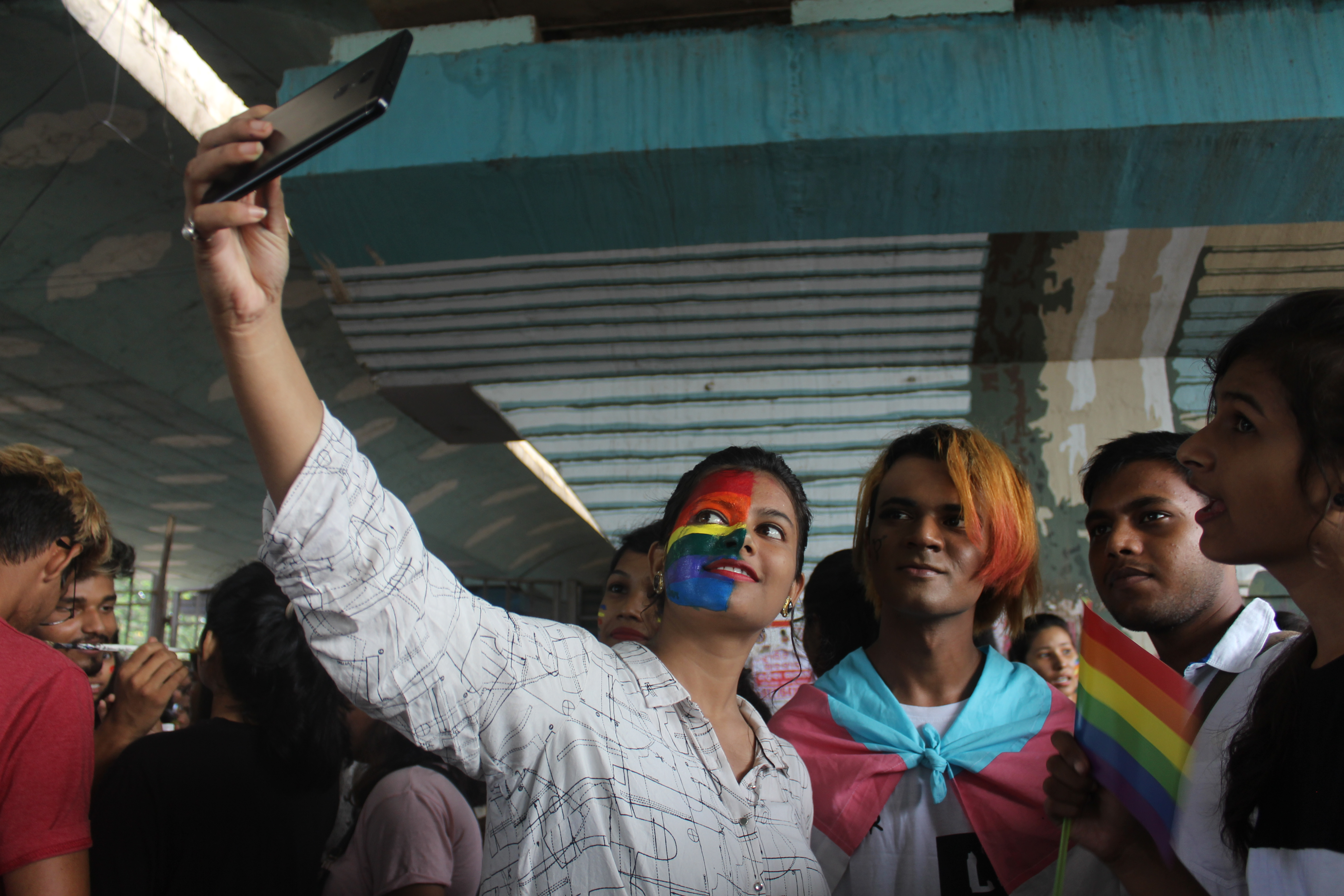
Participants of 2018 Bhubaneswar Pride Parade

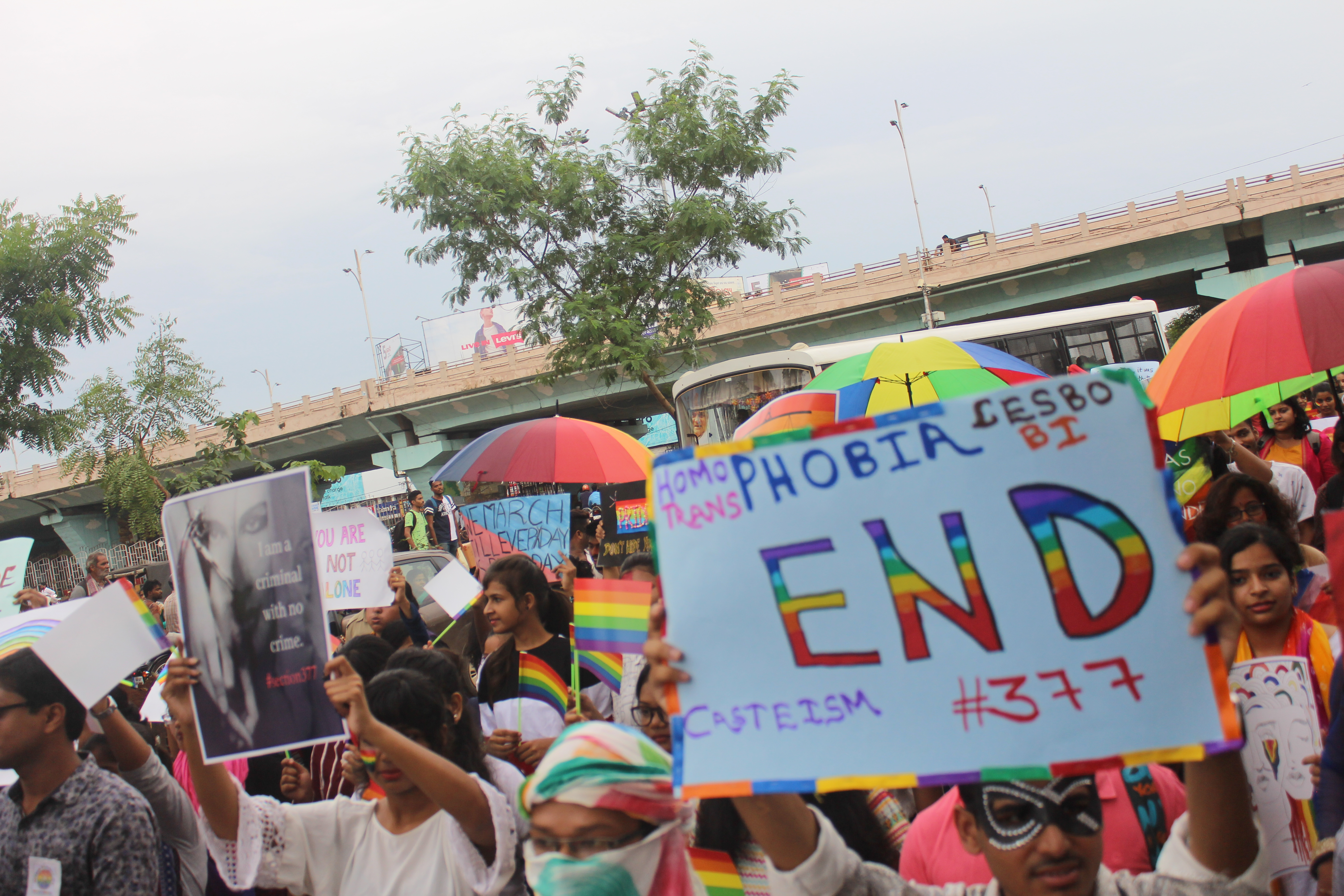
Participants of 2018 Bhubaneswar Pride Parade

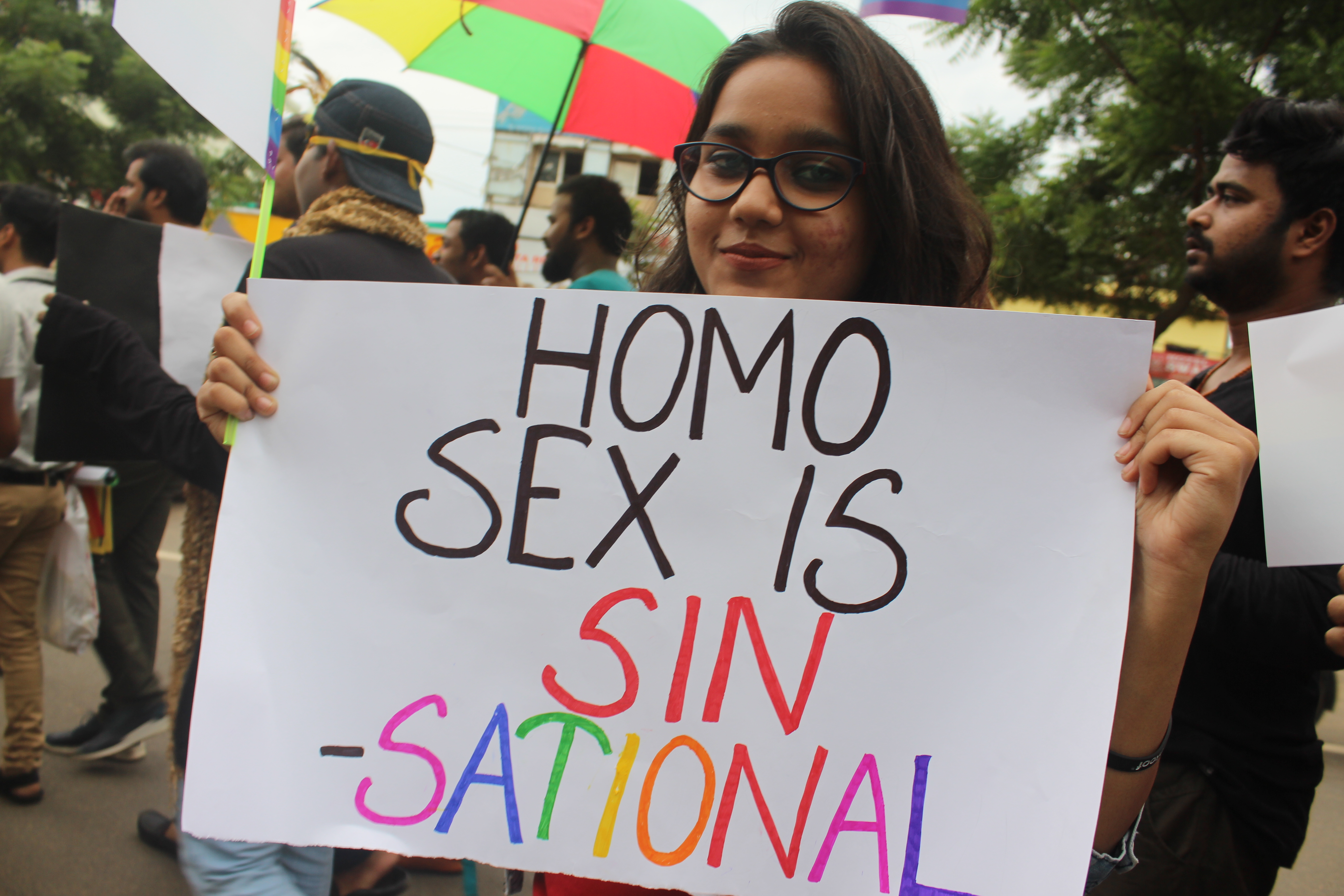
Participants of 2018 Bhubaneswar Pride Parade
