= Toldson =

Toldson is a surname. Notable people with the surname include:

- Ivory A. Toldson (born 1973), American academic
- Ivory Lee Toldson (died 2012), American psychologist
