= HR 40 =

HR 40 may refer to

- HD 895, a star system in the constellation Andromeda, also designated as HR 40
- Commission to Study and Develop Reparation Proposals for African-Americans Act, a proposed act to investigate potential reparations for slavery in the United States, introduced as H.R. 40
