= Nkechi Taifa =

Reparations activist

Nkechi Taifa is an American activist, attorney, organizer, scholar, and author. She is known for her work on African American reparations and is one of the founders of the National Coalition of Blacks for Reparations in America (N'COBRA).

== Early life and education ==
Taifa was born in 1954, and as a child witnessed racial segregation. In the eighth grade, a discussion about Huey Newton, co-founder of the Black Panther Party, sparked a discussion about why Newton had been arrested and why no African Americans were representing him in court; this conversation led Taifa to consider a career in law. Taifa graduated from Howard University and completed her legal studies at the George Washington University School of Law.

== Career ==
After law school, Taifa worked at several places including directing the Howard University School of Law's Equal Justice Program, serving as legal council for the American Civil Liberties Union, the Women’s Legal Defense Fund, and the National Prison Project. By the late 1980s and early 1990s, Taifa came to realize that sentencing reform would be "the civil-rights issue of our time", and she began to focus her work in the field. She defended Laura Whitehorn in the Resistance Conspiracy Case. Taifa and other activists have worked to secure compassionate release for Mutulu Shakur (stepfather of Tupac Shakur), Herman Bell, Jalil Multaqim, and others.

In 2002, Taifa joined the Open Society Foundations and Open Society Policy Center as a Senior Policy Analyst where she founded the Justice Roundtable Coalition, a gathering of more than 100 organizations working to reform federal criminal laws and policies.

In 2018, the Columbia University Center for Justice named Taifa a Senior Fellow.

=== Reparations ===
Taifa is among the founders of the Republic of New Afrika (RNA) and an early advocate for reparations for the descendants of enslaved Africans. A meeting in September 1987 led to the creation N’COBRA, the National Coalition of Blacks for Reparations in America, and Taifa was among the group. In the years since, Taifa continued to work on reparations and provided testimony in support of reparations. In addition to her domestic efforts, Taifa has testified about reparations before the Inter-American Commission on Human Rights and the Helsinki Commission. She has worked with representatives from the intergovernmental organization Caribbean Community, CARICOM, to further discussions about reparations for people of African descent.

== Honors and awards ==
In 2015, Taifa received the Cornelius “Neil” Alexander Humanitarian Award from the DC Commission on Human Rights. The National Bar Association presented her with the Wiley Branton Award in 2016. In 2018, Essence recognized her as one of seven African American women using the law to promote social justice, and in 2019 they named Taifa as one of its 100 Woke Black Women Advocating for Change. She received the Champion of Justice Award from the National Association of Criminal Defense Lawyers in 2021.

== Selected publications ==
- Taifa, Nkechi (1985). Shining Legacy. House of Songhay. ISBN 978-0-933807-00-6.
- Taifa, Nkechi (2020-09-22). Black Power, Black Lawyer. Taifa Group. ISBN 978-1-7347693-0-2.
- Taifa, Nkechi (1996–1997). "Codification or Castration? The Applicability of the International Convention to Eliminate All Forms of Racial Discrimination to the U.S. Criminal Justice System". Howard Law Journal. 40: 641.
- Taifa, Nkechi (2020-03-18). "Let's Talk About Reparations". Columbia Journal of Race and Law: Vol. 10 No. 1 (2020): Special Feature. doi:10.7916/CJRL.V10I1.5182.
- Taifa, Nkechi (2022-12-29). Reparations on Fire. ISBN 978-1-7379825-2-4.
- Taifa, Nkechi (2024-12-31). "15. Race, Mass Incarceration, and the Disastrous War on Drugs". Excessive Punishment. Columbia University Press. pp. 139–150. doi:10.7312/eise21216-016. ISBN 978-0-231-55924-9.
