= Mayor of Harlem =

Mayor of Harlem is an honorific title that may refer to:

- Willie Bryant (1908–1964), bandleader
- Tommy Smalls (1926–1972), disc jockey
- Leslie Wyche (1944–2018), community activist
- Greg Bandy (1949–), drummer
- Alpo Martinez (1966–2021), drug dealer
- Queen Mother Dr. Delois Blakely, nun and activist

== See also ==
- De Mayor of Harlem, a 1985 book of poetry by American David Henderson
