= Viola Plummer =

Community organizer, educator

- Born: February 16, 1937
- Died: January 15, 2024 (aged 86); New York, U.S.

Viola Plummer (16 February 1937 – 15 January 2024) was an American civil rights activist. She was a founding member of the December 12th Movement, a Black human rights organization, United States-based political lobby organization with United Nations status, and an African Union consultant status. She was involved in the movement to obtain reparations for African Americans. Plummer was chair for Millions for Reparations.

== Early life ==
Viola Plummer was born on 16 February 1937.

== Career ==
Plummer's activism started at the age of 17 in 1954 with the NAACP.

On October 17, 1984, it is reported that approximately 500 armed members of the FBI/NYPD Joint Terrorism Task Force (JTTF) arrested Viola Plummer, Coltrane Chimurenga, Jose Rios, Roger Wareham, Omowale Clay, Robert Taylor, Ruth Carter, and Yvette Kelly, who became known as the New York Eight. They had previously been under surveillance for two years.The federal trial for the New York 8 started on May 13, 1985. It took place at the Federal District Court in Manhattan, New York City. They called themselves 'black freedom fighters'. The defendants were charged with conspiring to commit murder, kidnapping, arson, bank holdups, armored car robberies, and prison breaks. The main witness was Howard L. Bonds who pleaded guilty. On August 1, 1985, a federal jury trail convened for the New York Eight. They were not charged for an alleged conspiracy which was the major charge. The major charge of conspiracy was that they had plotted to commit criminal activities as a continuation of crimes committed on 1981 Brink's robbery by another group of individuals that were part of other organizations. Where a Brinks armored car robbery took place and a guard and two policemen were killed.

Plummer was a founding member of the non-governmental organization the December 12th Movement in 1989 along with Sonny Carson, Coltrane Chimurenga, Elombe Brath, and Lawrence E. Lucas. In 1995, Plummer founded Sista'sPlace a coffee house and venue for jazz and blues musicians. In 2001, Plummer and members of December 12 Movement participated in the World Conference against Racism 2001 in Durban, South Africa. Plummer became chairperson of the December 12th Movement in 2002 following the death of Sonny Carson.

Plummer served as Chief of Staff for City Council Inez and Charles Barron. In 2007, Plummer was accused of being unruly during City Council meetings. City Council speaker Christine Quinn made a requirement that Plummer sign an agreement to behave during Council meetings. Plummer refused, which led to Plummer being fired. Community Board no. 3 in Brooklyn had voted to name 4 blocks of Gates avenue in Brooklyn after Sonny Carson. On April 19, of 2007 a Council panel rejected the renaming. On May 30 the full City Council rejected it.

On June 27, 2011, the December 12th Movement, headed by Viola Plummer and Charles Barron, formed the Freedom Party. Along with Charles Barron's bid for Governor of New York.

In 2022, Plummer lead a December 12 Movement delegation to Zimbabwe for its 7th Zanu PF People's Congress. In 2023, Plummer participated in the signing of the New York State Reparations Bill, where Governor Kathy Hochul established a commission to study reparations and racial justice.

Plummer died on January 15, 2024. Her funeral was held on January 27 at the House of the Lord Church in Brooklyn, New York.

== Awards ==
- 2017 Jazz Heroes - Jazz Journalists Association Award. These awards are given annually to honor heroes and heroines of jazz music for individuals who have impacted their local communities.
