= Mayors Organized for Reparations and Equity =

Coalition of U.S. mayors committed to reparations

Mayors Organized for Reparations and Equity (MORE) is a coalition of U.S. mayors committed to paying reparations to African American citizens of their cities. The association was announced on June 18, 2021, in commemoration of the first federally recognized Juneteenth holiday. Mayors from such large municipalities as Los Angeles, Denver, Sacramento, and Kansas City have been part of the coalition, as well as the mayor of the small town of Tullahassee, Oklahoma, with a population of 83.

== Mission ==
The program is aimed at supporting African American descendants of slavery. MORE's mission is to establish small pilot reparations programs in the various member cities which then could serve as models for a proposed future federal program to reduce the racial wealth gap. Member mayors vowed to do this by forming local committees of Black leaders to guide their work. In addition, the group promised to support the Commission to Study and Develop Reparation Proposals for African-Americans Act (known as H. R. 40), originally introduced in 1989 by U.S. Representative John Conyers and currently sponsored by Rep. Sheila Jackson Lee of Texas.

Most of the MORE members stressed that rather than direct payments to individuals, reparations would take the form of investments in communities, programs, and nonprofit organizations. Funding sources for the proposed city-led reparations programs were to be determined; MORE organizers estimate that a true national reparations program could cost $12 trillion.

Kansas City Mayor Quinton Lucas summed up MORE's mission this way:

"I think when you look at the historic underinvestment of the Black community in America, when you looked at the challenges that we placed upon many of our brothers and sisters, based upon, not just our past with slavery, but segregation, and redlining after that, it is essential that we find an opportunity to address and to right historical wrongs."

He pointed out that existing federal programs often don't succeed in targeting those most in need:

"There is a lot of federal money coming into the states right now, there's a lot of federal money coming into the cities. ... I don't want to see what happened with the PPP program where black-owned businesses, women-owned businesses were saying at the end of it, ... 'We didn't have the accounting help or professional services to actually get access to these loans.' I think as we are talking about trillions and federal spending coming into our cities, we need to make sure that we're targeting communities that need it the most."

== History ==
Mayors Organized for Reparations and Equity was conceived by then-Los Angeles Mayor Eric Garcetti, in many ways a response to the Black Lives Matter protests of 2020.

MORE was announced on June 19, 2021, with a membership of 11 mayors: Garcetti of Los Angeles, California; Michael Hancock of Denver, Colorado; Jorge Elorza of Providence, Rhode Island; Steve Adler of Austin, Texas; Steve Schewel of Durham, North Carolina: Esther Manheimer of Asheville, North Carolina: Quinton Lucas of Kansas City; Darrell Steinberg of Sacramento, California; Melvin Carter of Saint Paul, Minnesota; and Keisha Currin of Tullahassee, Oklahoma.

Former Mayors Garcetti and Hancock were co-chairs of MORE, while Michael Tubbs, the former mayor of Stockton, California, was listed as an Emeritus Member. While the mayor of Stockton, Tubbs had led an earlier coalition of 25 mayors, dubbed Mayors for a Guaranteed Income, who had committed to creating guaranteed minimum income programs in their cities "to combat poverty and systemic racism." These programs were to be funded by a mix of public and private funds. In addition to Stockton, other cities in the Tubbs coalition included Los Angeles; Saint Paul; Pittsburgh; Oakland, California; Paterson, New Jersey; Hudson, New York; Mount Vernon, New York; Tacoma, Washington; and Long Beach, California.

Other antecedents to the MORE coalition included reparative actions and commitments by a handful of states and cities:

- July 2020 — Asheville, North Carolina City Council "voted to approve reparations in the form of investments in areas of disparity for Black residents."
- September 2020 — California established a reparations commission. This action prompted L.A. Mayor Garcetti to conceive of MORE.
- January 2021 — Saint Paul, Minnesota, City Council voted 7–0 to create a reparations commission.
- March 2021 — Evanston, Illinois became the first city in the United States to pay reparations to African American residents (or their descendants) who were victims of unfair housing practices. The Evanston city council 8 to 1 to approve the reparations, which consisted of a $25,000 payment to African American households that can be used as down payments on their homes, house payments, or for home repairs. This was the initial payment, with plans to distribute 10 million dollars in reparations payments to black residents over the next 10 years. Evanston planned to pay for the program partially through a tax on legal marijuana sales.
- March 2021 — The San Francisco Board of Supervisors voted to create an African American Reparations Advisory Committee.
- June 15, 2021 — The Detroit City Council voted to create a reparations commission.

Garcetti promised to "double or even triple" MORE's membership by the end of 2021; to date, only one other mayor, Damon Seils of Carrboro, North Carolina, had joined the coalition.

=== Later developments ===
In April 2022, MORE member Mayor Tishaura Jones of St. Louis signed a bill allowing voluntary donations to a reparations fund. The bill allows St. Louis residents to donate to the fund in their property tax or water and refuse collection bills. The reparations bill, sponsored by a city alderman, was vague on details about eligibility and the potential disbursements of the funds.

In August 2022, MORE member Mayor Jorge Elorza of Providence proposed a $10 million reparations spending plan for the city, using federal coronavirus relief funds.

In July 2023, Kansas City Mayor Quinton Lucas created a K.C. Commission on Reparations, with 13 members.

As of November 2023, four individual members of the coalition have left their offices as mayors of their respective cities. In addition, the MORE website no longer functions.

== Member mayors ==
The following is a listing of MORE member mayors:

| Mayor | City | State | Party | Note |
|---|---|---|---|---|
| Eric Garcetti (Note: Garcetti is no longer the Mayor of Los Angeles, having been succeeded by Karen Bass in December 2022.) | Los Angeles | California | Democratic | Co-chair |
| Michael Hancock (Note: Hancock is no longer the Mayor of Denver, having been succeeded by Mike Johnston in July 2023.) | Denver | Colorado | Democratic | Co-chair |
| Tishaura Jones (Note: Jones is no longer the Mayor of St. Louis, having been succeeded by Cara Spencer in April 2025.) | St. Louis | Missouri | Democratic | Member of MORE coalition board |
| Keisha Currin | Tullahassee | Oklahoma | Democratic | |
| Jorge Elorza (Note: Elorza is no longer the Mayor of Providence, having been succeeded by Brett Smiley in January 2023.) | Providence | Rhode Island | Democratic | |
| Steve Adler (Note: Adler is no longer the Mayor of Austin, having been succeeded by Kirk Watson in January 2023.) | Austin | Texas | Democratic | |
| Elaine O'Neal (Note: O'Neal is no longer the Mayor of Durham, having been succeeded by Leonardo Williams in December 2023.) | Durham | North Carolina | Democratic | "Inherited" membership from previous Durham Mayor Steve Schewel |
| Esther Manheimer | Asheville | North Carolina | Democratic | |
| Quinton Lucas | Kansas City | Missouri | Democratic | Member of MORE coalition board |
| Darrell Steinberg (Note: Steinberg is no longer the Mayor of Sacramento, having been succeeded by Kevin McCarty in December 2024) | Sacramento | California | Democratic | |
| Melvin Carter (Note: Carter is no longer the Mayor of St. Paul, having been succeeded by Kaohly Her in January 2026.) | Saint Paul | Minnesota | Democratic | |
| Damon Seils (Note: Seils is no longer the Mayor of Carrboro, having been succeeded by Barbara Foushee in December 2023) | Carrboro | North Carolina | Democratic | "Inherited" membership from previous Carrboro Mayor Lydia Lavelle |
| Michael Tubbs (Note: Tubbs is no longer the Mayor of Stockton, having been succeeded by Kevin Lincoln in July 2021.) | Stockton | California | Democratic | Former Mayor of Stockton; Emeritus Member |

== See also ==
- Movement for Black Lives
- National Coalition of Blacks for Reparations in America
