= National Coalition of Blacks for Reparations in America =

American organization established in 1987

- Founded: 1987; 39 years ago
- Founders: Imari Obadele and Chokwe Lumumba
- Type: Civil rights organization
- Location: Washington, D.C.
- National Co-Chair: Kamm Howard

The National Coalition of Blacks for Reparations in America (N'COBRA) is an organization that advocates for financial compensation for the descendants of former slaves in the United States.

== History ==
The National Coalition of Blacks for Reparations in America was founded September 26, 1987, for the purpose of spreading information and supporting the long-term goal of gaining reparations for slavery in the United States. Founders of N’COBRA were Imari Obadele and Chokwe Lumumba; other founders included the National Conference of Black Lawyers, the New Afrikan Peoples Organization, and the Republic of New Afrika.

In 1994, N'COBRA hosted a national gathering of members in Detroit. One of the speakers was Queen Mother Moore, a founder of the Republic of New Afrika.

== Organizational structure ==
The work of N'COBRA is based on nine national commissions:

- Economic Development
- Human Resources
- Legal Strategies
- Legislation
- Information and Media
- Membership and Organizational Development
- International Affairs
- Youth
- Education

N'COBRA membership is broken down into three categories: individual members, national and local organizational chapters, and organizational affiliates. N’COBRA membership is seen in many different parts of the United States (such as Philadelphia) and in parts of Africa, Europe, Central, and South America, and the Caribbean.

Primary leadership for the organization is handled by a national board of directors.

== Positions ==
The stated mission of the National Coalition of Blacks for Reparations in America is:

...to win full Reparations for Black African Descendants residing in the United States and its territories for the genocidal war against Africans that created the TransAtlantic Slave "Trade" Chattel Slavery, Jim Crow and Chattel Slavery’s continuing vestiges (the Maafa). To that end, NCOBRA shall organize and mobilize all strata of these Black communities, into an effective mass-based reparations movement. NCOBRA shall also serve as a coordinating body for the reparations effort in the United States. Further, through its leadership role in the reparations movement within the United States and its territories, NCOBRA recognizes reparations is a just demand for all African peoples and shall join with others in building the international reparations movement.

Since 2017, N'COBRA has advocated for reparations compensation to be in the form of community rehabilitation and not payments to individual descendants of slavery.

In 2022, Taiwo Kujichagulia-Seitu of N'COBRA described the organization's goals for "full repair":

It can't just be a check. So one of the biggest things in terms of full repair is we have to eliminate that myth of white supremacy.... [L]et's pretend every Black person in this country was given land and that we were able to ... start catching up economically. That would not eliminate that myth of white supremacy, which means, the minute we're off our land, we could still be profiled by the police..., we would still have certain harms done to us. So when we talk about full repair, we have to look at solutions that target every single issue. And financial payments or money is not enough to fully repair what has gone wrong as a result of enslavement and colonization and now this belief in racism.

=== Juneteenth ===
N'COBRA has recognized Juneteenth — commemorating the emancipation of enslaved African Americans — as a holiday since the early 1990s.

=== H.R. 40 ===
H.R. 40, entitled the Commission to Study and Develop Reparation Proposals for African-Americans Act, is a Congressional reparations study bill that has been introduced by Representatives John Conyers (D-MI) and Sheila Jackson Lee (D-TX) to every Congress since 1989.

In 2001, N'COBRA came out in support H.R.40; in fact, the organization, working with chief legal consultant Adjoa Aiyetoro, was preparing a lawsuit against the federal government to demand reparations.

=== 2016 Movement for Black Lives policy platform ===
In August 2016, the Movement for Black Lives, a coalition that is tied to the Black Lives Matter movement, released a policy platform based around reparations. The platform listed six demands, comprising 40 policy recommendations, and "seeks reparations for lasting harms caused to African-Americans of slavery and investment in education and jobs." Reuters lauded the announcement of this platform as "the first time these Black-led organizations linked to the decentralized Black Lives Matter movement have banded together to write a comprehensive foundational policy platform."

== Criticism ==
Critics of N'COBRA claim that the organization has done little to advance the cause of reparations in the U.S. Reparations scholar William A. Darity Jr., for instance, wrote, "The ... NCOBRA agenda will not result in a reparations plan that will provide direct payments to black American descendants of U.S. slavery."

== Notable current and former members ==
- Imari Obadele — co-founder
- Chokwe Lumumba — co-founder
- James Forman
- Efia Nwangaza - National co-chair
- Adjoa Aiyetoro — chief legal consultant
- Robin Rue Simmons — lifetime member
- Conrad Worrill — economic development commissioner

== See also ==
- H.R. 40 — Commission to Study and Develop Reparation Proposals for African-Americans Act
- H.R. 40 Wikiquotes
- American Descendants of Slavery
- Mayors Organized for Reparations and Equity
- National African American Reparations Commission
- Civil Liberties Act of 1988 — reparations to Japanese Americans interned by the United States government during World War II)
- Reparations Agreement between Israel and the Federal Republic of Germany (1952)
