= Adjoa Aiyetoro =

American lawyer

Adjoa Aiyetoro is a lawyer, an activist and the former executive director of the National Conference of Black Lawyers (1993-1997). She was the chief legal consultant to the National Coalition of Blacks for Reparations in America (N'COBRA) and co-chairperson of their Reparations Coordinating Committee. She is now Professor Emerita at the William H. Bowen School of Law at the University of Arkansas, Little Rock.

== Education and teaching career ==
Adjoa Aiyetoro received her B.A. from Clark University in Worcester, Massachusetts (1967), and then graduated from George Warren Brown School of Social Work at Washington University in St. Louis with a M.S.W. (1969). In 1978, she received her J.D., graduating from Saint Louis University School of Law, shortly before she was admitted to the Missouri Bar. She went on to teach at the Washington College of Law (adjunct, 1997–2002), the University of California, Santa Barbara (Visiting Scholar and Professor, 2003), West Virginia University College of Law (Visiting professor, 2004), before settling into teaching at William H. Bowen School of Law since 2004, where she is now Professor Emerita. Aiyetoro taught courses on topics including Civil Procedure, Reparations and Remedies, Critical race theory, and Mass Violence.

== Law and legal advocacy ==
Aiyetoro worked for the United States Department of Justice Civil Rights Division, Special Litigation Section (1978-1982), working primarily in cases where people were institutionalized. From 1982 to 1993, Aiyetoro continued with work that addressed those imprisoned as she worked for the American Civil Liberties Union's National Prison Project. Aiyetoro was the executive director of the National Conference of Black Lawyers (NCBL) from 1993 to 1997, and during this time, prominent work included helping with the defense of Geronimo Ji-Jaga Pratt, a Black Panther who faced parole issues after his release from prison. In addition, she worked to streamline the organization's finances and administrative structure. Topics for which she advocated for during her time with the NCBL included issues related to imprisonment and criminal justice, environmental justice, Washington, D.C. statehood, and reparations for Africans and African descendants in the United States.

From 1997 to 2002, Aiyetoro served as the chief legal consultant for the National Coalition of Blacks for Reparations in America (N'COBRA). In this role she was also part of the Alexander v. Oklahoma legal team, led by Harvard Law Professor Charles Ogletree, who in the early 2000s sued the state of Oklahoma on behalf of the descendants of the Tulsa Greenwood Massacre. The U.S. Supreme Court decided not to hear the case.

In 1988, Aiyetoro worked with Congressman John Conyers on the legislative bill H.R. 60 that aim to create a commission to study reparations for African-Americans in the United States.

== Selected publications ==
Over her career, Aiyetoro has published articles and reports including the following:

- "Truth Matters: A Call for the American Bar Association to Acknowledge Its Past and Make Reparations to African Descendants" (2007)
- "Can We Talk? How Triggers for Unconscious Racism Strengthen the Importance of Dialogue" (2009)
- "Historic and Modern Social Movements for Reparations: The National Coalition for Reparations in America (N’COBRA) and its Antecedents" (2010, Coauthor: Adrienne D. Davis)
- "Why Reparations to African Descendants in the United States Are Essential to Democracy" (2011)
- Racial Disparities in Punishments and Alienation: Rebelling for Justice (2014)
- "African Descendant Women and the Global Reparations Movement," in Black Women and International Law: Deliberate Interactions, Movements and Actions (2015)
