= Conrad Worrill =

American activist and academic (1941–2020)

Conrad Worrill (August 15, 1941 – June 3, 2020) was an African-American writer, educator, activist, and talk show host for the WVON call-in program On Target. Organizations he was involved with included the Million Man March, and the National Black United Front. Worrill's activism centered on the need for greater independence in African-American life, and helping young people better understand the relationships between power and institutions.

== Early life ==
Worrill was born in Pasadena, California. His father was active in the NAACP and the YMCA, and played a large role in influencing Worrill to become an activist on his own. Conrad moved to Chicago when he was nine. He was married to Arlina Worrill and has several daughters, Femi Worrill, Sobenna Worrill, Michelle Worrill, and Kimberley Aisha King. He became a serious athlete, but was awakened to the prejudice and racial segregation that was present when his swim team faced heckling. Despite racial hardships, Worrill pursued football, basketball, and track. In 1962, Conrad was drafted into the army and stationed in Okinawa, Japan. While abroad, he read much about African American history, culture, and politics. He returned to America in 1963 and attended George Williams College, majoring in Applied Behavioral Sciences. While at college, his past experience overseas of seeing many African Americans sent to war led him to become active in the Black Power Movement. One of the organizations he was involved with was the Student Nonviolent Coordinating Committee, which was one of the first African American civil rights groups against war.

Worrill also earned a master’s degree in social service administration from the University of Chicago.

Worrill graduated in 1968 and was hired by a West Side YMCA as a program director. He left to pursue his PhD at the University of Wisconsin–Madison. His focus was on "Curriculum and Instruction in Secondary Social Studies". He wanted to help students understand the relationship between institutions and power. Upon receiving his degree from Wisconsin, Worrill taught for two years at George Williams College. In 1975, he transferred to the faculty of Northeastern Illinois University, where he led the Center for Inner City Studies.

== Activism ==
In addition to his teaching duties, Worrill was involved with the National Black United Front. The organization deals with addressing political, social, economic, and cultural forces that impact people of African descent in America today. The NBUF has been known for pushing a program of study that emphasizes the role of Africans and African Americans.

Worrill was the elected economic development commissioner of the National Coalition of Blacks for Reparations in America (N'COBRA). He was a special consultant of field operations in the Million Man March, which took place on October 16, 1995, and authored a weekly column entitled, Worrill's World.

== The Dr. Conrad Worrill Track and Field Center at Gately Park ==
The Dr. Conrad Worrill Track and Field Center at Gately Park is located at 10201 S. Cottage Grove Ave. Chicago. The center opened in 2021 after a 40-year effort by Worrill, a high school track athlete who lobbied mayors dating back to Harold Washington to build a designated place for Chicago’s kids to run. After plenty of false starts, then-Mayor Rahm Emanuel finally broke ground on the facility in 2018. The facility is also supported by a two-floor wing for After School Matters programs. The $54 million athletic center in Pullman opened in 2021 and has helped level the playing field for the city’s budding track athletes, and it has turned the Far South Side into a national track and field hub. The 139,000-square-foot field house, free and open to the public, sports a hydraulically banked track, eight sprint lanes, two long and triple jump runways and pits, a pole-vault runway and high jump and discus areas, as well as a scoreboard and 3,500 seats for fans.

Although Worrill was at the ground-breaking of the center, he died one year before its completion.

== Death ==
Worrill had cancer and died on June 3, 2020, at the age of 78, in Chicago, after contracting COVID-19 in mid-May during the COVID-19 pandemic in Illinois.
