= Ivory A. Toldson =

American academic (born 1973)

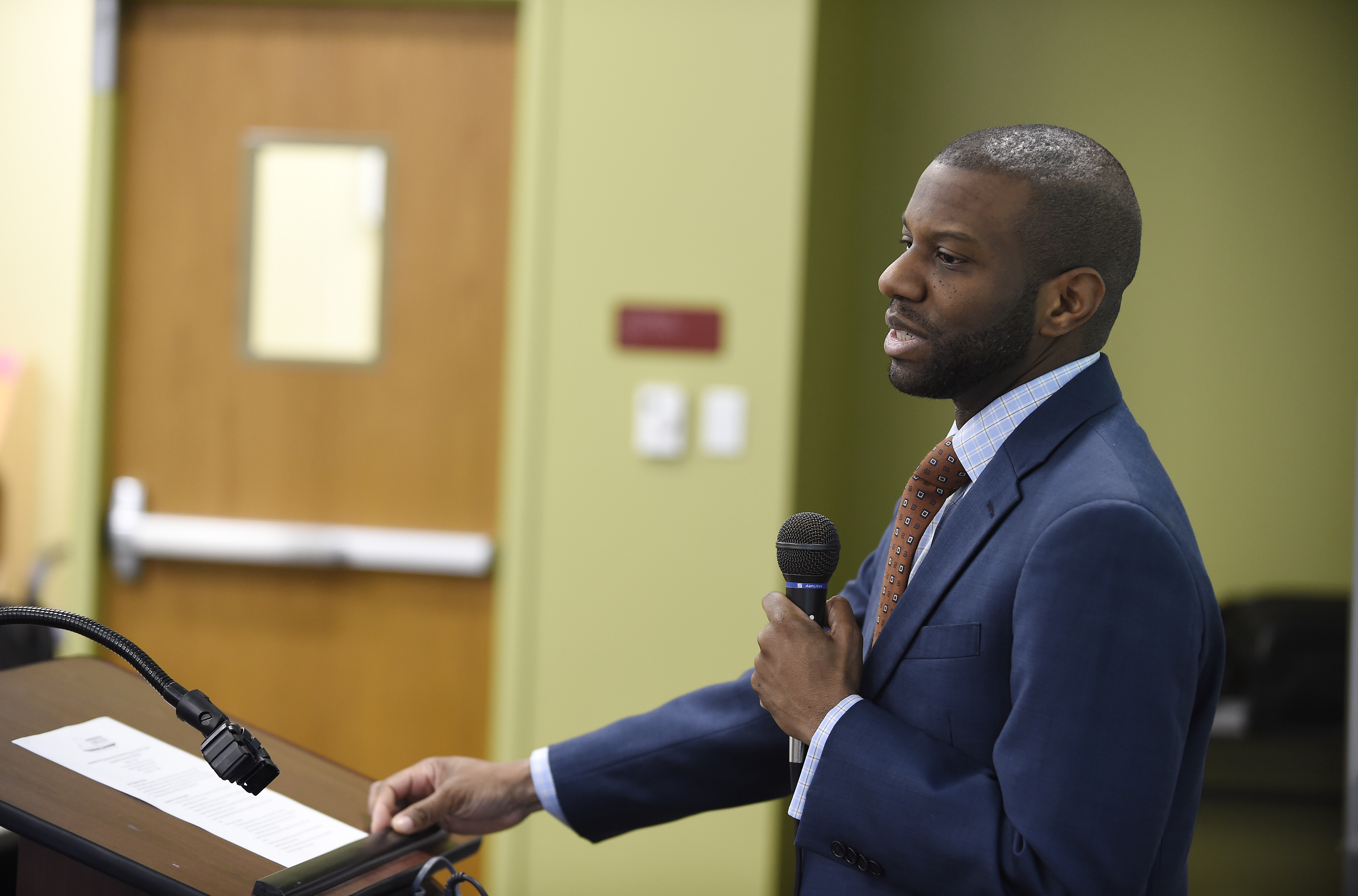
- Born: 1973 (age 52–53); Philadelphia, Pennsylvania, U.S.
- Education: Louisiana State University; Pennsylvania State University; Temple University
- Occupations: academic, author
- Known for: Counseling Psychology and Educational Research, Minority Serving Institutions and Historically Black Colleges and Universities, Public Scholarship and "Myth busting" Bad Stats, and Educational Equity and Access
- Title: Professor
- Spouse: Marshella Toldson
- Children: 2
- Parents: Ivory Lee Toldson (father); Johnita Scott (mother)

Ivory Achebe Toldson (born 1973) is an American academic and author. He is a professor of Counseling Psychology at Howard University, national director of Education Innovation and Research for the NAACP, the editor-in-chief of the Journal of Negro Education, and executive editor of the Journal of Policy Analysis and Research, published by the Congressional Black Caucus Foundation, Inc. He is formally the president of Quality Education for Minorities. He served as the executive director of the White House Initiative on Historically Black Colleges and Universities (WHIHBCUs) under President Barack Obama.

He is the author of (Bad Stats): Black People Need People Who Believe in Black People Enough Not to Believe Every Bad Thing They Hear about Black People.

== Early life ==
Toldson was born in Philadelphia, Pennsylvania. His father, Ivory Lee Toldson, was a professor at Temple University and Southern University. His stepfather, Imari Obadele, was a professor at Prairie View A&M University, a black nationalist, reparations advocate, and president of the Republic of New Afrika. Toldson's maternal grandfather is John Henry Scott, a voting and civil rights activist from Lake Providence, Louisiana. Toldson's mother, Johnita Scott, raised him in North Baton Rouge, where she ran a home-based daycare center in a working-class neighborhood. He attended and graduated from Istrouma High School.

After high school, Toldson attended Louisiana State University, where he earned a bachelor's degree, followed by a master's degree from Pennsylvania State University and a PhD in Counseling Psychology from Temple University. He completed predoctoral training at the United States Penitentiary, Atlanta where he completed a dissertation on the cross-cultural validity of a psychological assessment used to diagnose psychopathy.

In the essay, "Four Fathers and One Big Brother: Coming of Age with Tupac in the Ashes of the Black Power Movement," Toldson detailed his emotional experiences as a young Black man, working with Black power era figures, including Tupac Shakur's stepfather Mututu Shakur, and his Gen-X peers who were sentenced during the U.S. war on drugs. These experiences shaped many of Toldson's academic views on Black boys and men, the educational system, and the criminal justice system.

== Career ==
Toldson began his career at Southern University. While at Southern University, he was awarded the W.E.B. DuBois Fellowship from the United States Department of Justice for his research on police psychology. He also wrote Black Sheep: When the American Dream Becomes a Black Man's Nightmare, a novel for which he won the EboNetwork's Changing Faces award.

He later became an assistant professor of Counseling Psychology at Howard University. He is now a full professor. He also served as a senior research analyst for the Congressional Black Caucus Foundation, where he published Breaking Barriers - a series of research and policy reports that examined academic success factors among school-age Black males. Since 2008, he has been the editor-in-chief of the Journal of Negro Education, a quarterly peer-reviewed academic journal published by Howard University, established in 1932. In 2017, he became the executive editor of the Journal of Policy Analysis and Research.

Toldson was appointed by President Barack Obama to be the executive director of the White House Initiative on Historically Black Colleges and Universities from 2013 to 2016. In this position, he worked with the U.S. Secretary of Education to devise national strategies to sustain and expand federal support to HBCUs.

As contributing education editor for The Root, Toldson gained a national reputation for debunking myths about African-Americans and challenging what he considers "BS," or Bad Stats. For most of his articles he uses data analytics to contextualize and refute, commonly held notions about barriers to African American progress. The Washington Post quoted Toldson as saying, "[Black males'] desire to go beyond high school exceeded that of white males" and the achievement gap "really says more about our schools attitudes towards young black males." He also refers to the "Acting White Theory" as a myth, claims Black men are more likely to choose teaching as a profession than White men, denies any connection between single parent households and lack of educational progress in the Black community, and rejects the methods advocates use to covey a dropout and literacy crisis among African American students.

He had a prominent role in Janks Morton's documentary, Hoodwinked. Toldson's article for The Root, "More Black Men in Jail Than in College? Wrong" was featured on NPR and the BBC. Because of his reputation as a "myth buster," he routinely interviews for PolitiFact, where he critiqued claims made by Ben Carson, President Jimmy Carter and Sen. John Eichelberger. Toldson's positions has at times placed him at odds with social commentators. On this, NPR news reported, "[Toldson] says this refusal to look at the data closely — to prefer a story over the facts — creates more problems than it solves."

As the president of Quality Education for Minorities, "a Washington, D.C.-based nonprofit dedicated to improving the education of African-Americans, Alaska Natives, American Indians, Mexican Americans, and Puerto Ricans." Since 2016, as QEM president, Toldson has served as principal investigator of 8 National Science Foundation awards, totaling more than $3.2 million, to support capacity building efforts for STEM programs at Minority Serving Institutions.

== Honors and distinctions ==
Toldson as named "Young Researcher of the Year" at Southern University. He was dubbed a leader "who could conceivably navigate the path to the White House" by the Washington Post, one of "30 leaders in the fight for Black men," by Newsweek Magazine, and the "Problem Solver" by Diverse: Issues In Higher Education. Toldson has also been featured on MSNBC, C-SPAN2, NPR News and numerous national and local radio stations. In print, his research has been featured in The Washington Post, CNN.com, The New York Times, The National Journal, Essence Magazine, BET.com, The Grio, and Ebony Magazine.

Toldson was named in The Root 100, an annual ranking of the most influential African-American leaders. He was awarded the: Equity Champion Award from the New York City Department of Education; Outstanding Alumni Award from Penn State Black Alumni Association; and Top 25 Forensic Psychology Professors from ForensicsColleges.com.

He was awarded a Doctor of Humane Letters from Florida Memorial University at their 137th commencement in 2016.

== Personal life ==
Toldson is married to Marshella Toldson, and together, they have a daughter and son and live in Washington, DC. Toldson is an executive board member for the Mount Vernon Triangle Community Improvement District. He is a member of Alpha Phi Alpha fraternity and its World Policy Council, a think tank whose purpose is to expand the fraternity's involvement in politics and social policy worldwide. He is also a member of Sigma Pi Phi.

== Bibliography ==
- Douglas, Ty-Ron M.O.; Shockley, Kmt G.; Toldson, Ivory (2020). Bank, James A. (ed.). Campus Uprisings: How Student Activists and Collegiate Leaders Resist Racism and Create Hope. Multicultural Education Series. Shaun R. Harper (foreword). Teachers College Press. ISBN 9780807778456.
- Toldson, Ivory A. (2019). No BS (Bad Stats): Black People Need People Who Believe in Black People Enough Not to Believe Every Bad Thing They Hear about Black People. Boston, MA: Brill. ISBN 9789004397040.
- National Museum of African American History and Culture (Author), Marian Wright Edelman (Author), Ivory Toldson (Author) (2016) Picturing Children (Double Exposure). GILES Visual publishing.
- Lewis, Chance W.; Sealey Ruiz, Yolanda; Toldson, Ivory (2014). Teacher Education and Black Communities: Implications for Access, Equity and Achievement. Contemporary Perspectives on Access, Equity, and Achievement. Charlotte, North Carolina: Information Age Publishing, Inc (IAP). ISBN 9781623966997.
- Lewis, C., & Toldson, I. A. (Eds.). (2013). Black Male Teachers: Diversifying the United States' Teacher Workforce. Emerald Press: United Kingdom.
- Toldson, I. A. & Morton, J. (2012). Black People Don't Read: The Definitive Guide to Dismantling Stereotypes and Negative Statistical claims about Black Americans. Washington, DC: CreateSpace Publishing. ISBN 1478188995
- Toldson, I. A. (2004). Black Sheep. Baton Rouge: House of Songhay Commission for Positive Education. ISBN 9780910758536 Genre/Form: Psychological fiction; Suspense fiction. Library of Congress indexed as Substance Abuse Counselors Fiction. Monographs and Policy Reports
