= Sanyika Shakur =

American author (1963–2021)

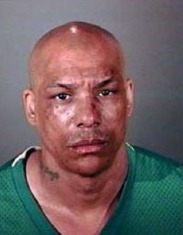
- 2007 mugshot
- Born: Kody Dejohn Scott; November 13, 1963; Los Angeles, California, U.S.
- Died: June 6, 2021 (aged 57); Oceanside, California, U.S.
- Other names: Monster, Monster Kody, Monster Kody Scott
- Occupations: Author, speaker
- Children: 3
- Parent(s): Ernest Scott, Birdie Scott
- Convictions: Armed robbery, assault, illegal possession of a weapon, parole violation, attempted murder, grand-theft auto
- Penalty: Imprisonment of six years

Sanyika Shakur (born Kody Dejohn Scott; November 13, 1963 – June 6, 2021), also known by his former street moniker Monster or Monster Kody, was an American author and former gangster. He was a member of the Los Angeles-based Eight Tray Gangster Crips. He got his nickname as a 13-year-old gang member when he beat and stomped a robbery victim until he was disfigured. Shakur claimed to have reformed in prison, joined the Republic of New Afrika movement, and wrote a 1993 memoir called Monster: The Autobiography of an L.A. Gang Member.

Monster describes how Shakur was drawn into gang life, his experiences as a gangster both on the street and in prisons, and eventually his transformation into a Black nationalist.

Shakur spent 36 months at San Quentin State Prison and five years at Pelican Bay State Prison, most of which was spent in solitary confinement, where he converted to Islam.

In March 2007, Shakur, already sought by police for parole violations and named on the city's most-wanted gang members list, was arrested by the Los Angeles Police Department for allegedly breaking into the home of an acquaintance and beating him in order to steal his car. The charges represented a possible third strike that could have sent Shakur back to prison for life. In May 2008, Shakur pleaded no contest to carjacking and robbery charges, and was sentenced to six years in state prison. Also in 2008, Shakur made his fiction debut with the publication of T.H.U.G. L.I.F.E. (Grove Atlantic Books). He was released from Pelican Bay after serving two-thirds of his 6-year sentence in August 2012.

== Early life ==
Shakur was born Kody Dejohn Scott in Los Angeles, California, on November 13, 1963, to Ernest Scott and Birdie Canada, both from Houston, Texas. Kody was the fifth of six children, including four brothers and two sisters (Kevin, Kim, Kerwin, Kershaun, Kody, and Kendis). Shakur believed it was probable that he was the son of former Los Angeles Rams running back Dick Bass and that he was conceived during an adulterous affair that his mother was having with the football star, a claim for which there is no compelling evidence. Ernest Scott held a bitter resentment toward Birdie's affair and physically abused his wife regularly throughout Shakur's early childhood.

Ernest Scott physically and emotionally abused Kody, routinely beating him and showing deliberate favoritism toward his biological children over Shakur, which included taking the other children out to dinners, movies, and trips to his hometown of Houston and intentionally leaving Shakur behind. In 1970, Ernest and Birdie Scott divorced, and, for the next five years, Ernest Scott would visit the family on weekends but still openly displayed contempt for young Shakur.

In 1972, Birdie Scott moved her family into a house on West 69th Street and Denker Avenue in a very rough and gang-infested neighborhood on the west side of South Central Los Angeles. According to Shakur, his first encounter with street gangs occurred at age ten when he was assaulted by two 13-year-olds who stole his money. Due to Birdie Scott's frequent absences working several jobs to support her large family and the neglect that he received from Ernest Scott, young Shakur would often hang out on the streets of his new neighborhood. It was around this time that he began hanging around his neighbor Stanley Tookie Williams, the leader of the West Side Crips street gang.

In his memoir Blue Rage, Black Redemption, Tookie Williams recalled the occasions in which he and other adult members of the Crips would smoke PCP and lift weights at Williams's house. According to Williams, Shakur was always present at the house and would watch in awe as the gang members would lift weights and tell stories about gang fights and shootings that they had committed. In the book, Williams also expressed his regret regarding his behavior around the impressionable young Shakur, and he held himself personally responsible for exposing Shakur to drugs, as Shakur himself would later become a frequent PCP user.

== Joining the Crips ==
In 1975, a member of the West Side Crips nicknamed Sidewinder formed a set called the Eight Tray Gangster Crips (also known as 83GC, ETG or ETGC) in Shakur's neighborhood. On the evening of June 15, 1975, the day of his sixth-grade graduation, Shakur was courted into (also known as being "jumped in," when gang members beat up the new recruit to see if he or she is brave enough to fight back and defend himself or herself) the ETGs.

Shakur and another gang member then hotwired a stolen car after which he and several members of the ETGs, all armed with revolvers and shotguns, tracked down members of the Brims street gang (a set of the Bloods) who had been hanging out in the Crips' neighborhood. The ETGs opened fire on a group of approximately 15 Brims, shooting several of them. Shakur, armed with a sawed-off 12-gauge shotgun and instructed not to return to the car unless he used all eight rounds of the weapon, shot several Brims gang members that evening.

=== Disfiguring an older black man ===
As a new member of the Crips, Shakur was mentored in the ways of gang-banging by Tray Ball. In 1977, at the age of 13, Shakur and Tray Ball attempted to rob an older black man who was walking through their neighborhood. The man punched Shakur in the face and, after being physically restrained by Tray Ball when he attempted to run, was kicked and stomped by Kody for approximately twenty minutes. Kody's attack left the man in a coma with his face permanently disfigured.

According to Shakur, Crips present at the crime scene overheard police officers saying that whoever assaulted the man was a "monster" and reported this back to him. From that point on, other members of the ETGs referred to Shakur as Monster, and he took the name as a street moniker.

=== First arrest for shooting ===
Shakur's first arrest occurred in 1978 at age 14 after he shot and killed an employee of a fast-food restaurant who had assaulted his younger brother Kershaun and later assaulted and pulled a gun on Shakur. Kershaun Scott later joined the Eight Trays and assumed the nickname Li'l Monster.

A week after being released from jail, Shakur was arrested again after being falsely accused of shooting a member of the Inglewood Family Bloods while he and other members of the Crips were on their way to a roller-skating rink in Compton, California. On January 14, 1979, Shakur was arrested for assault and grand-theft auto and served nine months at Camp Munz in Lake Hughes, California.

== The rivalry between the Eight Trays and the Rollin' 60s: the beginning of Crip-on-Crip violence ==
During Shakur's stay at Camp Munz, several major events occurred on the streets of South Central Los Angeles that involved the Crips. On March 15, 1979, the West Side Crips leader Stanley "Tookie" Williams was arrested for four murders committed during two separate robberies while on an alleged drug binge (to his death, Williams steadfastly denied committing the murders). Williams was sentenced to death row and executed by lethal injection on December 13, 2005.

On August 9, 1979, Raymond Washington, the founder of the Crips, was murdered in a drive-by shooting near his home. Because Raymond Washington always made it a point never to walk up to cars, it was determined that his killers were people he knew personally since he had walked up to the murderers' car and had a conversation with them prior to being shot. Washington's murder was blamed on the Hoover Crips (now known as the Hoover Criminals or Hoover Gang), which started a war between the East Side Crips and the Hoovers.

=== Shooting and hospitalization ===
Shakur, along with his best friend Deautri "Crazy De" Denard, were deeply involved in this gang war and were responsible for shooting and assaulting dozens of members of the Rollin' 60s. On December 31, 1980, 16-year-old Shakur was ambushed and shot six times by three adult members of the Rollin' 60s after being set up by a group of girls who were dating friends from his set. Perhaps what saved his life was that earlier that evening Shakur had been drinking a cheap brand of low-end fortified wine called Night Train and smoked PCP with other members of the ETGs as the gang celebrated New Year's Eve, and the level of inebriation that Shakur was under at the time of the shooting prevented him from going into shock. After being shot, Shakur reported having hallucinations of seeing the faces of all of the gang members he had shot since joining the Crips, as well as seeing the infant daughter that he had with his girlfriend Tamu. Shakur survived the shooting and was hospitalized for several weeks.

Shakur's younger brother Kershaun, who was by now a member of the Eight Trays and nicknamed Li'l Monster, sought vengeance for his older brother's shooting. On New Years Day 1981, Kershaun and several teenage members of the ETGs committed a string of retaliatory shootings. Kershaun shot two teenagers who were standing in the front yard at a house party that was being thrown in the Rollin' 60's neighborhood and, later that evening, shot another teenager to death in a drive-by as the young man was walking down the street.

Kershaun was later arrested and sentenced to five years in California Youth Authority for murder as a juvenile. While recovering in the hospital, Shakur's assailants from the Rollin' 60s came to the hospital in an attempt to finish him off. Due to the intervention of a nurse who was attending to him, however, Shakur was unharmed. When he was released from the hospital, he continued gang-banging and would spend the remainder of the 1980s in and out of the penal system for numerous violent offenses.

== Changing his name to Sanyika Shakur ==
While in prison during the 1980s, Shakur befriended members of the Republic of New Afrika movement. Shakur, who dropped out of high school, began to educate himself in prison. He changed his name to Sanyika Shakur and began changing his viewpoint regarding his role in the plight of black people in the United States of America. After being released from prison in 1988, Shakur married his longtime girlfriend Tamu.

In January 1991, Shakur was arrested for assault and grand-theft auto after beating up a crack dealer who was working as a police informant and stealing the dealer's van. Shakur was incarcerated during the 1992 Los Angeles riots that occurred after the acquittal of the four police officers accused of beating Rodney King following a traffic stop. The beating of white truck driver Reginald Denny was committed by members of the ETGs in Shakur's neighborhood. This event, as well as participating in Leon Bing's book Do Or Die, inspired Shakur to write his book Monster: The Autobiography of an L.A. Gang Member.

== Friendship with 2Pac and Vibe Magazine Interviews ==
In the early 1990s, Kody, now calling himself Sanyika Shakur, met rapper Tupac Shakur. The two became friends and Shakur mentioned Tupac in the introduction of his book. In 1996, as Shakur was on the run from police for a parole violation, he met up with Tupac on the set of the x-rated version of Tupac's music video "How Do U Want It." This was the last time that Shakur would ever see Tupac.

On September 13, 1996, Tupac Shakur died after being shot in a drive-by shooting in Las Vegas, Nevada, seven days earlier, allegedly by members of the South Side Compton Crips. Shakur would later interview Tupac's alleged murderer, Orlando Anderson, for a December 1997 Vibe Magazine article about Tupac's murder, in which Anderson denied being involved in the rapper's murder.

After being captured by police, Shakur was sent to Pelican Bay State Prison, where Death Row Records CEO Suge Knight was also incarcerated for a parole violation that stemmed from his participation in the assault on Anderson. According to the Vibe Magazine article, Shakur, upon hearing that Tupac had been shot, initially suspected that Suge Knight had set him up because Tupac was planning to leave Death Row Records to start his own record label.

In the article Shakur stated that he was incredulous after hearing Knight's claims that

1. Tupac died owing him money, despite selling over USD$60 million worth of albums for Death Row Records;
2. he knew that all of Tupac's possessions, including his home and his cars, were in Knight's name.

At the end of the interview, Knight told Shakur that Orlando Anderson was indeed the person who killed Tupac. Orlando Anderson was killed on May 29, 1998, in an unrelated shooting.

== Since 2000 ==
In March 2007, Shakur, already sought by police for parole violations and named on the city's most-wanted gang members list, was arrested by the Los Angeles Police Department for allegedly breaking into the home of an acquaintance and beating him in order to steal his car. The charges represented a possible third strike that could have sent Shakur back to prison for life.

In May 2008 Shakur pleaded no contest to carjacking and robbery charges, and was sentenced to six years in state prison. Also in 2008, Shakur made his fiction debut with the publication of T.H.U.G. L.I.F.E. (Grove Atlantic Books). He was released from Pelican Bay after serving two-thirds of his 6-year sentence in August 2012.

In November 2013, Shakur published a book of essays titled Stand up, Struggle Forward: New Afrikan Revolutionary Writings on Nation, Class, and Patriarchy (Kersplebedeb Books ISBN 9781894946469).

On July 10, 2017, Shakur was sent back to prison for an assault conviction out of San Diego County. He was incarcerated at Centinela State Prison in Imperial, California, and later at Solano State Prison in Vacaville, California, where he was interviewed by the radio program Uncuffed. He was later released on parole.

On June 6, 2021, Shakur was found deceased in a tent in a homeless encampment in Oceanside, California. His cause of death according to the San Diego County Coroner's Office is a stroke.
