= Journal of Negro Education =

- Discipline: Education
- Language: English
- Edited by: Ivory A. Toldson

Publication details
- History: 1932 to present
- Publisher: Howard University School of Education (United States)
- Frequency: Quarterly

Standard abbreviations
- ISO 4: J. Negro Educ.

Indexing
- ISSN: 0022-2984 (print); 2167-6437 (web)
- JSTOR: jnegroeducation

Links
- Journal homepage

The Journal of Negro Education is a quarterly peer-reviewed academic journal published by Howard University, established in 1932 by Charles Henry Thompson, who was its editor-in-chief for more than 30 years. The journal's aim is to identify and define the problems that characterize the education of Black people in the United States and elsewhere, to provide a forum for analysis and solutions, and to serve as a vehicle for sharing statistics and research on a national basis. Ivory A. Toldson has served as editor-in-chief since 2008.

The journal listed three aims as its mission: first, to stimulate the collection and facilitate the dissemination of facts about the education of Black people; second, to present discussions involving critical appraisals of the proposals and practices relating to the education of Black people; and third, to stimulate and sponsor investigations of issues incident to the education of Black people.

Notable contributors in the fields of education, sociology, history, and other disciplines over the years have included Horace Mann Bond, Ralph J. Bunche, Kenneth B. Clark, James P. Comer, W. E. B. Du Bois, E. Franklin Frazier, Edmund Gordon, Robert J. Havighurst, Dorothy Height, Dwight O. W. Holmes, Charles S. Johnson, Alain Locke, Thurgood Marshall, Benjamin E. Mays, James Nabrit, Jr., Dorothy B. Porter, and others.

== History ==
=== Dr. Charles Henry Thompson ===
The Journal of Negro Education was established by Howard University faculty member Dr. Charles Henry Thompson in 1944. Thompson was born in Jackson, Mississippi on July 18, 1896. He received his high school education and began his undergraduate education at Virginia Union University, one of the few schools enrolling African-Americans at the time. He finished his collegiate studies at the University of Chicago and earned a bachelor's degree in psychology. He returned to Virginia Union University to obtain his Doctorate of Literature.

Dr. Thompson worked returned to his Alma mater Virginia Union University as a psychology instructor from 1920 to 1921 . He then became the Director of instruction at the Alabama Normal School, now known as Alabama State University, in Montgomery, Alabama. After leaving Montgomery he became a professor at Summer High School and Junior College in Kansas City, Kansas.

Thompson arrived at Howard University in 1926 as an associate professor of education and became an official professor in 1929. In 1932 he became the Dean of the College of Educations, and transitioned to the Dean of the College of Liberal Arts in 1938. Thompson established the Journal of Negro Education in 1932 and became the journal's first editor and chief.

=== The influence of other African-American publications ===
Before the establishment of the Negro Journal of Education researchers relied on Negro magazines for information regarding the African American community. Black periodicals served as a way to discuss the status of the African-American community post civil war. The first peridocals were pamphlets and newspapers such as The Freedom Journal. A few publications credited for sparking the flame of the journal are The Voice of the Negro, Crisis magazine, and the Journal of Negro History.

The Voice of the Negro, first published in 1904, created a space for educated Black Americans from the south to have a voice post slavery. The content focused on social questions surrounding the place of Black Americans in America post-slavery. The Journal of Negro Education and The Voice of the Negro share a few contributors such as W.E.B. Du Bois and Booker T. Washington, two prominent leaders of the Black American community at the time.

Crisis magazine was first published in 1910 as the official periodical for the National Association for the Advancement of Colored People's (NAACP). The magazine was established by W.E.B. Du Bois to serve as a space for Black American writers and artists, and was dedicated to the educational advancement of Black Americans. The magazine highlighted Black American success and discussed topics of the Black American experience in America.

The Journal of Negro History (now the The Journal of African-American History) was published in 1916 by the Association for the Study of Negro Life and History and under the leadership of Carter G. Woodson. The journal's articles sometimes focused on education but primarily emphasized the history of Black Americans.

=== Howard University in 1932 ===
The president of Howard University at the time was Mordecai Wyatt Johnson, who supporters referred to as the "Messiah". He declared his main goal as president as "a calling, a challenge, and a duty" to advance higher education among Black students in America. He wanted Howard to become a model university and back the first issues of the Journal of Negro Education by securing an office space and encouraging faculty and students to engage in social forums.

The University grew as a major university due to significant funding from President Herbert Hoover. Howard University became a primary location for Black scholars to share their ideas. Several members of the faculty across all departments were involved in major events involving Black Americans at the time. The university wanted to use federal funding to their advancement to grow Black intellectualism across the new generation of young Black scholars.

=== Founding and original purpose ===
When the Journal of Negro Education was originally founded they only had enough funding to pay for printing and postage. The founder Charles H. Thompson defined the three purposes as the collection of facts about the education of Black Americans, the discussion of proposals and practices in relation to Black Americans, and to investigate problems blocking the education of Black Americans. The journal would become the first publication to discuss these topics.

== Notable contributors ==
=== W.E.B. Du Bois (1868–1963) ===
W.E.B. Du Bois is a prominent African-American educator, scholar, author, and activist. Du Bois thought that a change in American ideas were the key to eliminate inequality and bigotry in the United States of America post Civil War. Moved by racially motivated violence in the American South Du Bois published and shared his ideas on race relations between White and Black Americans, He founded The Crisis, the NAACP's official publication, to serve as the main hub to share his and other Black Americans ideas on the progress of Black Americans status in the country. He was very vocal on his left-wing political stances which ultimately led to his firing from the NAACP as their Director of Special Research in 1948 and being excluded by several leaders in the Black American community and civil rights organizations.

W.E.B. Du Bois contribution to the journal included an article titled Does the Negro Need Separate Schools? In the article he argues that Black Americans need separate schools from their White counterparts due to racial based hostility and violence. While he thinks the separation is necessary he also calls for a better condition for Black American institutions and the fair treatment of Black American students in primarily White institutions. He emphasizes that Black American students need an education tailored to their own experiences and history citing several institutions that are modern day recognized as Historically Black Colleges and Universities.

=== Horace Mann Bond (1904–1972) ===
Horace Mann Bond was an educator and author. He constantly supported the NAACP and several African independence movements across the diaspora. His main concern of research and activism throughout his life was the education of Black Americans. He frequently traveled to different nations in Africa to compare and contrast the differences between one group of Black people fighting colonialism and another group fighting segregation and Jim Crow.

His article in the Journal of Negro Education was titled The Curriculum and the Negro Child. His article examines the role in society on Black American children's curriculum in schools. He explores how chattel slavery have shaped educational content primarily in the American south and calls for effort to reshape how curriculum are developed.

== The Journal Today ==
=== Modern Topics ===
The journal continues to publish quarterly and has around 1,350 subscribers internationally. They have the same mission and continue to promote and platform scholarly research and discussions surrounding the education of African Americans in the United States and challenging popular research reports through a scholarly lens.

=== Dr. Ivory A. Toldson ===
Dr. Ivory A. Toldson is the current Editor in Chief for the journal. He is currently an associate professor at Howard University and a senior research analysis. He has had his research featured on several notable news outlets and He won the EboNetworks' Changing Faces Award for outstanding literary achievement in 2005 for his novel Black sheep: When the American Dream Becomes a Black Man;s Nightmare. He also became the fourth recipient of the Du Bois Fellowship from the US Department of Justice. Toldson holds a Ph.D. in Counseling Psychology from Temple University and completed his dissertation on black men in the criminal justice system while working at the United States Penitentiary as a correctional and forensic psychology resident. He previously worked at Southern University and the University of Michigan before joining Howard University's faculty.

== Past Editors In Chief ==
=== Dr. Walter Daniel (1963-1970) ===
Daniel joined faculty at Howard University in 1929 as an assistant professor and was promoted to associate professor in 1935. He resigned in 1951 to work as a specialist in Higher Education for the United States Department of Education. He returned to Howard in 1961 and retired officially in 1970.

=== Dr. Earle H. West (1969-1973) ===
Dr. West started at Howard as an assistant professor of education in 1962 and became a full-time professor in 1970. He was the associate Dean of the College of Education from 1978-1988.

=== Dr. Faustine C. Jones-Wilson (1978-1992) ===
Dr Jones-Wilson began her career at Howard in 1969 as an assistant professor. She became the Acting Dean of the School of Education from 1991-1992 and retired in 1993.

=== Dr. Sylvia T. Johnson (1993-2001) ===
Dr. Johnson started her career at Howard as a student and graduated with a B.A. in Mathematics. She became the professor of Methodology and Statistics at Howard before becoming the editor-in-chief.

=== Dr. Rc Saravanabhavan (2001-2004) ===
Dr. Saravanabhavan became a research associate at the HU Center for disability and Economic Policy Studies and an adjunct professor in the Human development and Psychological Studies department in the School of Education.

=== Dr. Fredrick D. Harper (2004-2008) ===
Dr. Harper was on the editorial board for 22 years before becoming the editor-in-chief. He also served on the editorial board for other scholarly journals. He retired from his position as a professor of Counseling in 2012.
