= California Reparations Task Force =

California government agency

The California Reparations Task Force was a non-regulatory state agency in California established by California Assembly Bill 3121 in 2020 to study and develop reparation proposals for African Americans, especially those who are descendants of persons enslaved in the United States. It was the country's first statewide reparations task committee and was created to study methods to resolve systemic racism against African Americans resulting from slavery's enduring legacy. The task force was designed to recommend ways to educate the California public of the task force's findings and to propose remedies.

Five members were appointed by the governor, two members were appointed by the president pro tempore of the Senate, and two members by the speaker of the Assembly. The members voted to limit their study to exclusively address redress for descendants of antebellum slavery in the United States, rather than a broader application to people of general Black African descent who live in the United States.

After almost three years of fact-finding, reports, and public hearings, California’s first-in-the-nation reparations task force on Thursday, June 29th, 2023, released its final report to state lawmakers with recommendations for how the state should atone for its history of racial violence and discrimination against Black residents.

== History ==
The task force convened in 2021. In 2022, the committee received testimony about segregation, redlining, voter restrictions, and other forms of discrimination and discussed whether it was appropriate to pay reparations to all African Americans in California or only those whose ancestors were enslaved. The committee was presented with calculations for certain scenarios that include figures amounting to hundreds of thousands of dollars in reparations for each California resident who can prove they are the descendant of an enslaved person. One estimate suggested "just under $1 million for each Black Californian descended from slaves," based on a calculation of $127,000 per year of life expectancy gap between Black and White Californians. Kamilah Moore noted that California could not afford to pay such a debt directly, and that the reparations might not come in the form of cash, but equivalent value, such as free health care programs or medical clinics.

California is the first U.S. state to establish a body to study discrimination against African Americans and recommend reparations. Such an initiative is not without precedent, however; Germany made payments to Holocaust survivors and the United States made payments to Japanese Americans who were interned during World War II. In one case a family's land was taken through eminent domain and became a state park.

== Members ==
Members are: senator Steven Bradford, Amos C. Brown, Cheryl Grills, Lisa Holder, assembly member Reginald Jones-Sawyer, Jovan Scott Lewis, Kamilah Moore (Chair), councilmember Monica Montgomery Steppe, and councilmember Donald K. Tamaki. Eight members are African American and the ninth Japanese American.

== Activities ==
Among the solutions proposed by the group were a public apology from California for its role in permitting slavery and its numerous legacies of white supremacy, as well as payments to people whose ancestors were slaves. The California Task Force to Study and Develop Reparation Proposals for African Americans issued its final report to the California Legislature on June 29, 2023.

=== San Francisco ===
According to the New York Times, while several American cities are considering comparable solutions, none has been as active as San Francisco, whose 15-member task team has provided municipal officials with 111 proposals in a preliminary report. Besides the reconstruction motion, the reparations task team highlighted many issues that have left Black communities behind, ranging from "a statewide ban on affirmative action" to discriminatory hurdles that have resulted in limited access to medical services. The city task force announced paying $5 million payment once, to anyone who qualifies in an effort to eliminate the racial wealth gap, which has been a key justification for reparations for a long time. In contrast, the task force on reparations for the state of California has proposed a sliding scale with a limit of $1.2 million for elderly Black individuals. The cash amount received a lot of attention, but it is mostly viewed as unachievable in a city with mounting fiscal challenges and a lack of political agreement on the subject.

== Results ==
One of the recommendations of the Task Force, for the repeal of the Penal exception clause from the state constitution's ban on slavery and involuntary servitude, was placed on the November 2024 ballot by the Legislature as ACA 8 on June 27, 2024.

== See also ==
- Evanston Reparations Committee
- New York Reparations Task Force
- African Descent-Citizens Reparations Commission
- SupportReparations.org
- Alliancefor.org
