= Imari Obadele =

Black nationalist, advocate for reparations, and president of the Republic of New Afrika

- Born: Richard Bullock Henry; May 2, 1930; Philadelphia, Pennsylvania, U.S.
- Died: January 18, 2010 (aged 79)
- Education: PhD, Temple University
- Occupations: Black nationalist, professor
- Employer: Prairie View A&M University
- Known for: Malcolm X Society; Republic of New Afrika; National Coalition of Blacks for Reparations in America
- Title: President, Republic of New Afrika (1971–1991)
- Family: (stepson) Ivory A. Toldson

Imari Obadele (born Richard Bullock Henry) (May 2, 1930 – January 18, 2010) was a Black nationalist, advocate for reparations, and president of the Republic of New Afrika.

== Early life ==
Richard Henry was born in Philadelphia, and as a young man founded a civil rights organization there with his brother Milton. The two later moved to Detroit.

After the murder of Malcolm X, they helped form the Malcolm X Society and, dissatisfied by the progress achieved by nonviolent approaches to civil rights movement, came to embrace Black separatism.

== Republic of New Afrika ==
Richard and Milton adopted the African names Imari and Gaidi Obadele in 1968. With others, founded the Republic of New Afrika. At the meeting founding the group, they formed a "government in exile". Obadele was designated the information minister, and soon published a pamphlet "War in America". The RNA's declared territory was Alabama, Georgia, Louisiana, Mississippi, and South Carolina.

The Republic of New Afrika also formed a paramilitary unit: the Black Legion. In 1969, the unit was involved in a gun battle in Detroit that killed a police officer.

Imari split from his brother, who came to reject militancy, in 1970, and was also elected president of the Republic of New Afrika. Obadele and the group moved its headquarters to a house in Jackson, Mississippi, despite failing to purchase an 18-acre (73,000 m^{2}) plot.

== Arrest and prison ==
Obadele and ten others (the "RNA 11") were arrested and charged in the wake of a joint police / FBI raid on the house in 1971. The raid culminated in a gunfight that killed an officer. It was later determined that Obadele was not at the scene, and murder charges against him were dropped.

In 1973, he was convicted of conspiracy to assault a federal agent and sentenced to twelve years in prison (of which he served five). Amnesty International described him as a political prisoner, and the group claimed that it had been targeted by the FBI because of its political views. FBI documentation that was later released confirmed that the agency was following the group. Internal FBI memos suggested that Obadele "be kept off the streets" and that he was one of the country's "most violence-prone Black extremists".

== Later life ==
After prison, Obadele went on to earn a PhD in political science from Temple University. He became a professor at Prairie View A&M University.

In 1987, Obadele and Chokwe Lumumba formed the National Coalition of Blacks for Reparations in America (N'COBRA), an organization dedicated to seeking financial compensation for the descendants of former slaves in the United States.

== Personal life ==
His stepson is academic and author Ivory A. Toldson.
