= African Descent-Citizens Reparations Commission =

The African Descent-Citizens Reparations Commission in a commission created to determine whether or not the State of Illinois should award reparations to black people.

The commission can have up to 18 members, by law at least 3 members must be representatives of organizations that support reparations and at least 8 of the members must be black.

== See also ==
- New York Reparations Task Force
- California Reparations Task Force
