= Evanston Reparations Committee =

Illinois city government agency

The Evanston Reparations Committee was established by the City Council of Evanston, Illinois in 2019 as the first publicly funded reparation program for Black Americans. The first program approved for using the funds, cash payments for housing support, was passed by the city in March 2021.

== Passage ==
On November 25, 2019, the City Council voted 8–1 to commit the first ten million dollars over the next ten years of the city's Municipal Cannabis Retailers’ Occupation Tax (3% on gross sales of cannabis) to fund a local reparations program with the intention to focus on housing and the wealth gap for Black residents suffered from redlining in Evanston.

The first program to spend money out of fund was approved, with another 8–1 vote, on March 22, 2021, was the "Local Reparations Restorative Housing Program" targeted for housing and economic development programs for Black Evanston residents and build the wealth of Black residents. It was the first such government funded program in America. Qualifying homes were granted up to $25,000 for down payments or home repairs. To qualify for the program, Black Americans must either have lived in Evanston between 1919 and 1969 or be a direct descendant of someone who did.

The program had the endorsement of the National Coalition of Blacks for Reparations in America and the National African American Reparations Commission.

Alderwoman Robin Rue Simmons was the architect of the reparations program. The other members of the Reparations Committee were 5th Ward Councilmember Bobby Burns, 2nd Ward Councilmember Krissie Harris, 8th Ward Councilmember Devon Reid and residents Bonnie Lockhart, Claire McFarland Barber, and Carlis Sutton.

== Impact ==
As of early 2023, Evanston had only distributed $400,000 of the proposed $10 million in spending. A total of 16 applicants have received money while about 620 of Black residents on the waiting list or have otherwise applied. The city has since expanded the potential disbursement options to include cash as well as vouchers.

The program has provided support for some local residents but has also been cited as an example of ineffective reparations, with critics arguing that local-only funding lacks sufficient resources to close the gap between white and Black wealth. Advocates for this and similar programs argue that they should complement local and national initiatives.

== See also ==
- California Reparations Task Force
