= Robin Rue Simmons =

American former politician

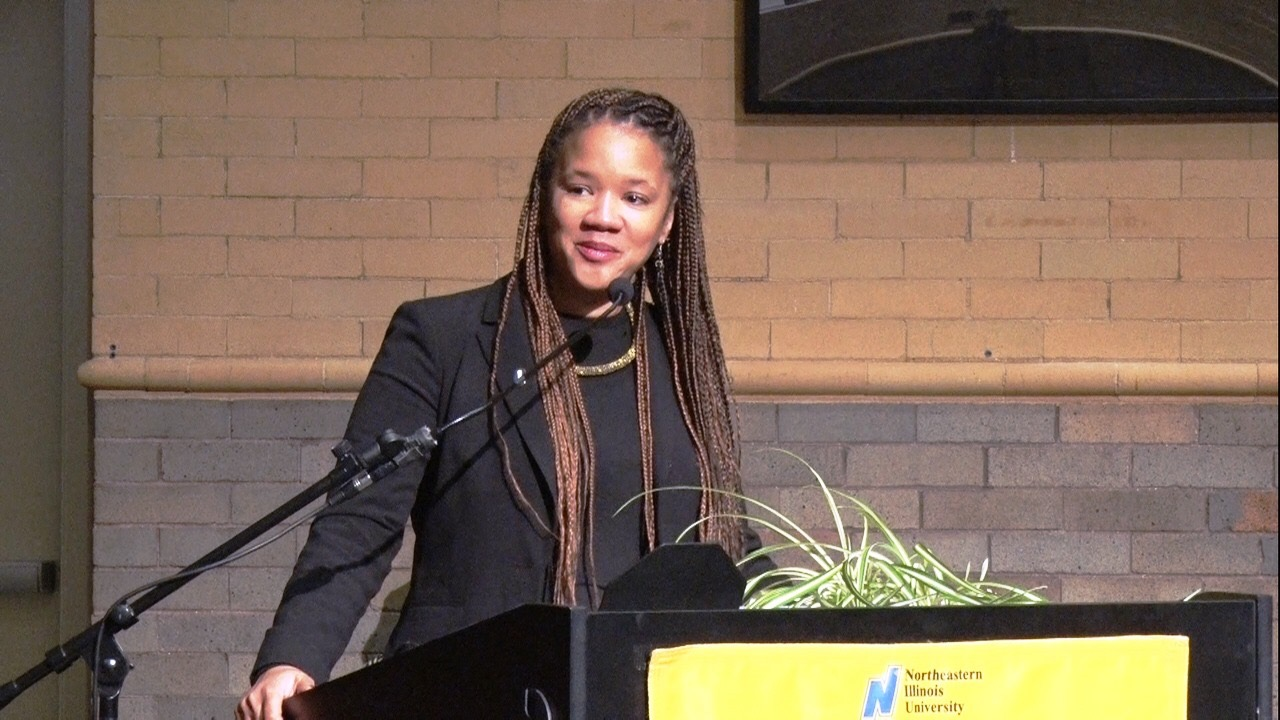

Alderman of the 5th Ward of Evanston
- In office 2017–2021

Personal details
- Born: March 12, 1976 (age 50) Evanston, Illinois, U.S.
- Occupation: Former politician, activist
- Known for: Leading the first government-funded reparations legislation in the U.S.
- Committees: Chair of the City of Evanston's Reparations Committee

Robin Rue Simmons (born March 12, 1976) is an American former politician and national leader for local reparations for African Americans.

Rue Simmons was born and raised in the largely segregated 5th Ward of Evanston, Illinois.

From 2017 to 2021, Rue Simmons served as the alderman of the 5th Ward. As alderman, she led the passage of the United States' first government-funded reparations legislation. The local reparations initiative is being funded by the first $10 million of adult-use cannabis sales tax revenue collected by the City of Evanston. The first stage of the reparations program is focused on homeownership. After leaving office, Rue Simmons now serves as the chair of the City of Evanston's Reparations Committee.

Rue Simmons is Founder and Executive Director of the not-for-profit FirstRepair, which "informs local reparations, nationally." She also is a commissioner of the National African-American Reparations Commission, a lifetime member of the National Coalition of Blacks for Reparations in America, a board member of Connections for the Homeless, and previously served as a board member of the National League of Cities' National Black Caucus of Local Elected Leaders.
