= Charles Henry Thompson =

American educational psychologist (1895–1980)

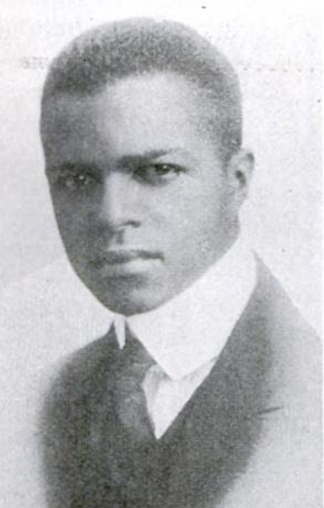
- Born: July 19, 1895; Jackson, Mississippi, United States
- Died: January 16, 1980 (aged 84); Hyattsville, Maryland, United States
- Education: Virginia Union University; University of Chicago
- Known for: Educational psychology; Founder of The Journal of Negro Education

Charles Henry Thompson (19 July 1895 – 16 January 1980) was an American educational psychologist and the first African-American to earn a doctorate degree in educational psychology. He obtained a master's degree and Ph.D. at the University of Chicago. Born in Jackson, Mississippi, he became an educator at Howard University. During his time at Howard, he was the dean of the liberal art college and later became the dean of Howard's graduate school, where he made several administrative and scholarship changes. Additionally, he founded The Journal of Negro Education, an academic journal pertaining to the education of African-American students. Thompson himself published more than 100 scholarly articles, editorials, and research papers, many of which pertained to the teaching and advancement of African-American students' education. Throughout his extensive academic career, he was a legal consultant for various desegregation school cases, prominently in Sweatt v. Painter, Sipuel v. Board of Regents of the University of Oklahoma, McLaurin v. Oklahoma State Regents. He also was a legal consultant for Brown vs. Board of Education, though to a lesser extent than the three former cases.

== Early life and education ==
Charles Henry Thompson was born on July 19, 1895, in Jackson, Mississippi. He was an only child to parents Reverend Patrick H. and Mrs. Sara E. Thompson. Thompson attended his early years of education at Jackson College. Since there were very few high schools for African Americans in Mississippi, in 1911 Thompson decided to attend Virginia Union University to obtain his high school and college education. Virginia Union University was one of the few colleges that allowed the enrollment of African Americans. Joshua Baker Simpson, the Union faculty member of that university inspired many students like Thompson to appreciate research as a tool for enhancing the human condition, specifically the African Americans.

After graduating from college with high honors in 1917, he went to serve in the military overseas during World War I. After finishing his time in the military in 1919, Thompson was enrolled in the University of Chicago. At this university, African Americans were usually required to repeat a year or two of their undergraduate studies to prove their abilities to complete a graduate study. This resulted in Thompson earning a second baccalaureate with special honors in psychology. In 1920, he completed a master's degree in education with a thesis titled "A Study of the Reading Accomplishments of Colored and White Children". His thesis focused mainly on comparing the different learning abilities of black children in the City of Chicago. Then he was teaching at Virginia Union, while working on his doctorate in fall 1921 at Chicago. From 1922 to 1924, Thompson was an instructor in teacher training at the State Normal School in Montgomery, Alabama. He then completed his doctorate in educational psychology at the University of Chicago in 1925.

Thompson was one of the first African Americans to complete a doctorate in education with a specialization in educational psychology. He chose this pathway as an educational psychologist because of his desire to be able to be in a position to help others gain access to information. Thompson worked to provide other African American students with the opportunity to use the resources available to him in education to be able to spread information about education and race. He had a strong belief that education should be available to gifted African American students and anyone in low income families so that everyone would be able to have access.

In 1942 he received a Rosenwald Fellowship which enabled him to study the social and educational philosophy of Booker T. Washington, race relations and Negro education since the Civil War.

== Personal life ==
Thompson's wife, Mae Stewart Thompson, from Washington, D.C. was a long-standing physical education teacher in the Columbia District Public Schools. She later became a health and physical education supervisor at Howard University.

== Career ==
Thompson first served as an instructor of psychology at Virginia Union University from 1920 to 1921. The following year, he became the director of instruction at Alabama State Normal School until his departure in 1924. A year later in 1925, Thompson found another position, this time at Summer High School and Junior College in Kansas as a psychology and social science professor. He would quit this position again only a year later.

=== Howard University ===
Thompson finally settled down at Howard University, serving as a faculty member from 1926 up until his retirement in 1966. He held many positions during his time at the university, including: Associate Professor, Professor and Chairman of the Department of Education, Dean of the College of Liberal Arts, Dean of the Graduate School and Founder and editor-in-chief of The Journal of Negro Education. As the Dean of the College of Liberal Arts, Thompson implemented selection procedures of promising high school graduates through the utilization of nationwide scholarship examinations. He forwarded efforts into improving admission processes to the university and introduced an advisory system catered towards freshman students. Furthermore, Thompson aided in both studying and expanding the usage of standardized testing and in developing faculty tenure policies and improvement procedures (at the university). As the Dean of the Graduate School, Thompson oversaw changes to numerous sections of the programs, including the master's degree requirements as well as both the standards of admission and scholarship. Thompson also served as an editorial consultant for both “The Nation’s Schools” from 1943 until 1950 and “World Book Encyclopedia” from 1942 until 1962. Thompson served as an expert education witness on numerous desegregation cases, including the 1946 “Sweatt Case” in Texas, the 1947 “Sipuel Case” in Oklahoma and the 1947 “McLaurin” in Oklahoma.

== Ideas ==
=== "Separate but equal" counter-arguments ===
In an article in Thompson's The Journal of Negro Education titled “Court Action the Only Reasonable Alternative to Remedy Immediate Abuses of the Negro Separate School”, Thompson provided a counter-argument for segregated schools and argued that in order to desegregate schools, courts must implement the desegregation. Thompson argued that courts have fewer disadvantages than any other method of fighting segregation. He also argued that courts are the best option for long-term changes and policy changes could take years. Additionally, in his paper, he emphasized that segregated schools have no benefit and he broke down his argument in three parts. Segregation is a form of stigmatization. This stigmatization virtually always comes from white policy makers and administrators. At the time Thompson wrote his article, it was argued that segregated schools are at the benefit of African-American children. However, Thompson emphasizes that segregation is implemented because of an overarching idea that African-Americans are “inferior and undesirable” to Caucasians. Segregated schools are not economically viable. The cost of maintaining and running two schools in the same district is doubled since there is an African-American and Caucasian school. He also purported that if there are not enough funds for both schools. Most of the educational resources go to the Caucasian school, which disadvantages the African-American schools. He asserts that due to this unequal distribution that the “separate but equal” fairness mantra is a myth. Segregated schools are not only disadvantageous to African-American children, but also Caucasian children. He argues that children's formative years should be spent exposed to different races in order to learn to respect others. The integration could promote anti-racist and prosocial attitudes among both groups of children. He counter-argues the notion that integrating African-American children in Caucasian school could create increase prejudice by stating African-Americans will experience prejudice in other ways in their lives regardless and integration is better for future decreasing of prejudicial attitudes.

=== Argument against racial intellectual inferiority ===
During Thompson's early academia career, most papers pertaining to African-American students presented those students inherently inferior in terms of scholastic and academic achievement than their Caucasian counterparts. Thompson believed that the existing evidence of academic inferiority was unreliable. He used samples from various schools across several states comparing rural and city raised Caucasians and African-Americans. He found that African-Americans who were schooled in cities outperformed Caucasians who were schooled in rural areas, presumably because there was a lot of allocated funding to city schools. He argued that there aren't racial differences in academic performance and performing adequately is a result of a child's environment. However, in rural areas African-Americans underperformed compared to their Caucasian counterparts. Thompson attributed this to lack of opportunities. He concluded that the overwhelming accepted idea of racial intelligence inferiority (during his time in early academia) was a myth and it was undemocratic to impose policy based on unfounded science.

=== Educating gifted African-American students ===
Thompson emphasized that those who grew up in poverty or in segregated schools were the ones to benefit the most from higher education. He proposed the following to aid in the success of gifted students: lower tuition fees, for accessibility of gifted students who can't afford higher education, provide nationwide scholarship for exceptional African-American students, to reevaluate the admission guidelines to target prospective students with the most potential to succeed, emphasize preparatory, vocational and cultural goals rather than purely academic to educate students by emphasizing talent, from research, teaching and leadership, smaller class sizes taught by skilled professors, similar to those of Virginia Union. For professor to be proactive leaders and mentor prospective gifted students. Thompson argued that his proposed university improvements would aid in the success of gifted students. Although, his improvements were not approved when he first introduced them, he slowly made progress throughout his academic career as he moved on to larger administrative roles.

== Contributions ==
=== The Journal of Negro Education ===
In 1931, Thompson decided to create a publication called The Journal of Negro Education. Even before creating this journal, Thompson would write articles for other papers criticizing the laws on education for African Americans and Caucasians. This made him to want to create the paper to draw more global attention on the issues of education for African Americans. However, during the time that Thompson proposed his paper was when there were many budget cuts to African-American education. The importance of the paper was doubted in this time of low funds but was thought to be useful to bring national attention to Howard University. His main purpose for starting the journal was because he believed there was a lack of information on African American education making it hard to have good schooling for people of colour. He expressed four reasons why he created The Journal of Negro Education: the lack of information on African Americans, the need for discussion about the segregation of schools, the journal would propose a further investigation in the lack of education for African Americans and finally the journal was something that was necessary at that time. Thompson worked to bring the journal to life despite the challenges that he came across. To the authority figures that worked for the University Thompson would explain the journal in more mild terminology to not cause alarm to them so they could provide funding for it. However, to the audience that read his journal he stayed true to make bold statements about the discrimination that occurred in education for African Americans. He used the journal as a way to provide information about African-American culture, history, arts, and other related subjects. Thompson pushed this journal as a way to talk about the issues of racial segregation and to bring more awareness about it. He received support from Du Bois and Walter White (head of the NAACP) but the editor of The Journal of Negro History was against Thompson publishing his journal because of how similar the name and content would be to his paper. This did not stop Thompson as he still pushed to create this journal. Thompson's overall goal of the journal was to reduce educational discrimination and bring awareness of the problems with segregation.

=== Sweatt v. Painter case ===
At the start of the school year in 1944 there was a surge of African Americans applying for post-secondary schooling but due to a lack of resources, space and staff it was not possible to admit all these students. This sparked debate among many people of color as they wanted to be able to attend higher schooling at universities that were at the time only for White Americans. When this came to the attention of Thompson, he wrote an article in The Journal for Negro Education about the failure of the government to follow through with the Gaines decision that stated that segregated schools should have equal access and resources. An important case that occurred during Thompson's time was Sweatt v. Painter, for which Thompson was asked by Marshall to be an expert witness. This was a case about the issue of a student named Bill Sweatt who wanted to attend a law school that was only for White Americans, so he went to court to argue that he should be allowed to attend. Thompson played a role in contributing to Sweatt's case by providing information about the issues with segregation in education. He spent weeks preparing to testify for the case as well as touring the University of Texas to understand how the environment is. He compared the difference in resources and opportunities for African Americans vs. White Americans in Texas schools to show the discrimination that African Americans suffered. Not everyone agreed with Thompson's views and it was argued that his testimony was irrelevant so it no longer was a part of the record. However, his role in the case brought an important aforementioned perspective in the discrimination against African Americans in education.

=== Brown v. Board of Education case ===
The research that Thompson conducted on the social and educational philosophy of Booker T. Washington, race relations and Negro education since the Civil War, with his Rosenwald fellowship, helped contribute legal strategies used in several desegregation cases among them the 1954 Brown v. Board of Education case. Before the submission of the second brief in 1953 the NAACP Legal Defense Fund held a three day conference to critique the brief and the position papers to be submitted and Thompson was one of the participants.

== Achievements ==
- Dean of the College of Liberal Arts
- Dean of the Graduate School
- Founder & Editor-in-Chief of the Journal of Negro Education
- Editorial Consultant:
  - The Nation's Schools
  - World Book Encyclopedia
