= Republic of New Afrika =

US black nationalist organization and movement

- Provisional Government of the Republic of New Afrika
- Flag of the organization

- U.S. States defined as "subjugated national territory" at the 1968 foundational conference
- Established: 1968
- Type: Black nationalist secession movement
- Location: the American South
- President: Janiya Amirie Evans
- Vice President: Ayodele Kofie

The Republic of New Afrika (Note: RNA activists began spelling "Afrika" with a "k" in the mid-1970s on the theory that this spelling was more consistent with precolonial African languages.) (RNA) is a black nationalist organization in the United States founded in 1968 by supporters of Malcolm X. The organization has three goals: creation of an independent socialist country or nation-state in the heart of the Black Belt in the American South, payment by the U.S. federal government of several billion dollars in reparations to African Americans for the damages inflicted on them through slavery and Jim Crow laws, and a plebiscite of all African Americans to determine their desires for citizenship. Its provisional government claims sovereignty over the states of Louisiana, Mississippi, Alabama, Georgia and South Carolina as subjugated national territory. Robert F. Williams was its first president.

The organization experienced significant decline in the early 1970s primarily due to sustained government repression, including violent raids and mass arrests that imprisoned key leaders and disrupted operations. Efforts to build institutions involved land purchases, but the project encountered severe repression from federal and state authorities.

== History ==
The idea of the Republic of New Afrika was conceived by members of Revolutionary Action Movement who were under the tutelage of Queen Mother Moore who was a member of Marcus Garvey’s UNIA. In 1962, Queen Mother Moore along with future RNA co-founder Oserjiman Adefume, had put together the provisional Government of the Afro-Descendant Nation with future RNA president drafted as the president for this early iteration of the provisional government. In 1964 RAM leadership drafted up a multi point program which included a Nation within a nation/government in exile concept which would ultimately become the Republic of New Afrika. Malcolm X was sent on his second trip to Africa as part of a RAM assignment where he was to field support for this fledgling nation and its armed guerilla forces from among his allies in Africa such as Muhammad Babu, Julius Nyerere, Ahmed Ben Bella, Gamal Abdel Nasser, Sekou Toure, & Kwame Nkrumah. Following the events of the 1967 Detroit riot and the Newark Riot which took place within the same time frame, future RNA co founders H Rap Brown, Gaidi Obadele, Amiri Baraka, and Ron Karenga called and held a black power conference in July of 1967. The vision for this country was first promulgated at a Black Government Conference held in Detroit, Michigan on March 31, 1968. This conference was convened by the Malcolm X Society, an outgrowth of a Detroit civil rights group called the Group on Advanced Leadership (GOAL). The 500 attendees drafted a Declaration of Independence, a constitution, and the framework for a provisional government. They settled on the five Southern states of Louisiana, Mississippi, Alabama, Georgia and South Carolina as subjugated national territory.

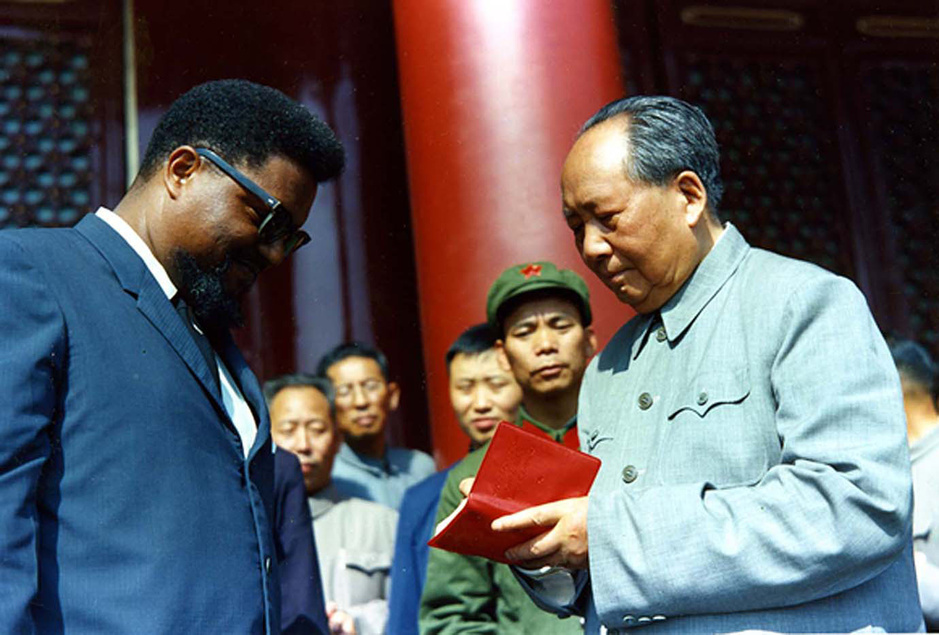
Chinese leader Mao Zedong signing a copy of his Little Red Book for Robert F. Williams, first president of the Republic of New Afrika organization

Robert F. Williams, then living in exile in Cuba, was chosen as the first president of the provisional government; attorney Gaidi Obadele (Milton Henry) was named first vice president and Betty Shabazz second vice president. Other cabinet members included Imari Obadele (minister of information), Herman Ferguson (minister of education), Queen Mother Audley Moore (minister of health and welfare) and H. Rap Brown (minister of defense). An RNA delegation traveled to China to meet Williams in June 1968. Williams accepted the position and proposed diplomatic initiatives for the RNA to undertake. Taifa writes that Imari Obadele was the driving force behind the group, serving in various roles until his death in 2010.

The Provisional Government of the Republic of New Afrika (PG-RNA) advocated a form of cooperative economics through the building of New Communities—named after the Ujamaa concept promoted by Tanzanian President Julius Nyerere.

It proposed and created militant self-defense through the building of local people's militias; a standing army to be called the Black Legion.

The organization was involved in numerous controversial issues. For example, it attempted to assist Oceanhill-Brownsville area in Brooklyn to secede from the United States during the 1968 conflict over control of public schools. Additionally, it was involved with shootouts at New Bethel Baptist Church in 1969 (during the one-year anniversary of the founding) and another in Jackson, Mississippi, in 1971. (It had announced that the capital of the Republic would be in Hinds County, Mississippi, located on a member's farm.) In the confrontations, law-enforcement officials were killed and injured. Organization members were prosecuted for the crimes. The members claimed they acted in self defense.

In 1985, Libyan leader Muammar Gaddafi offered Louis Farrakhan guns to begin the African American nation-state. Farrakhan said that he told Gaddafi that he preferred an economic investment in black America.

The Republic of New Afrika's influence persisted through publications, such as Imari Obadele's War in America: The Malcolm X Doctrine (1977) and Free the land! (1984), and Nkechi Taifa's Reparations Yes (1993). Key figures like Chokwe Lumumba, elected vice president in 1971, became a prominent attorney defending Republic of New Afrika members and later mayor of Jackson, Mississippi (2013-2014), where he advanced cooperative economics before his death.

== Notable members ==
- Queen Mother Moore was a founding member.
- Betty Shabazz, widow of Malcolm X, was elected as second vice president of the first administration in 1968, working alongside Williams and Henry.
- Chokwe Lumumba, formerly Edwin Finley Taliaferro of Detroit, was elected as second vice president in 1971. He later became an attorney, working in Michigan and Mississippi in public defense. After settling in Jackson, Mississippi, he was elected to the city council there. He was elected as mayor in 2013, dying in office in February 2014 of natural causes.
- Safiya Bukhari, former Black Panther Party and Black Liberation Army member, founder of the Jericho Movement for U.S. Political Prisoners and Prisoners of War, and co-founder of the Free Mumia Abdul-Jamal Coalition (NYC) was elected as vice-president.
- Sanyika Shakur, former leader of Eight Tray Gangster Crips and author (Monster: The Autobiography of an L.A. Gang Member)
- Yuri Kochiyama, civil rights activist.

=== Leaders ===
- Robert F. Williams, President in Exile (1968–1971)
- Imari Obadele, President (1971–1991)

== Publications ==
- The Article Three Brief. 1973. (New Afrikans fought U.S. Marshals in an effort to retain control of the independent New Afrikan communities shortly after the U.S. Civil War.)
- Obadele, Imari Abubakari. Foundations of the Black Nation, Detroit: House of Songay, 1975.
- Brother Imari [Obadele, Imari]. War In America: The Malcolm X Doctrine, Chicago: Ujamaa Distributors, 1977.
- Kehinde, Muata. RNA President Imari Obadele is Free After Years of Illegal U.S. Imprisonment. In Burning Spear Louisville: African Peoples Socialist Party, 1980. pp. 4–28
- Obadele, Imari Abubakari. The Malcolm Generation & Other Stories, Philadelphia: House of Songhay, 1982.
- Taifa, Nkechi; Lumumba, Chokwe (1993) [1983, 1987]. Reparations Yes (3rd ed.). Baton Rouge: House of Songhay.
- Obadele, Imari Abubakari. Free The Land!: The True Story of the Trials of the RNA-11 Washington, D.C. House of Songhay, 1984.
- New Afrikan State-Building in North America. Ann Arbor. Univ. of Michigan Microfilm, 1985, pp. 345–357.
- "The First New Afrikan States". In The Black Collegian, Jan./Feb. 1986.
- A Beginner's Outline of the History of Afrikan People, 1st ed. Washington, D.C. House of Songhay, Commission for Positive Education, 1987.
- America The Nation-State. Washington, D.C. and Baton Rouge. House of Songhay, Commission for Positive Education, 1989, 1988.
- Walker, Kwaku, and Walker, Abena. Black Genius. Baton Rouge. House of Songhay, Commission for Positive Education, 1991.
- Afoh, Kwame, Lumumba, Chokwe, and Obafemi, Ahmed. A Brief History of the Black Struggle in America, With Obadele's Macro-Level Theory of Human Organization. Baton Rouge. House of Songhay, Commission for Positive Education, 1991.
- RNA. A People's Struggle. RNA, Box 90604, Washington, D.C. 20090–0604.
- The Republic of New Africa New Afrikan Ujamaa: The Economics of the Republic of New Africa. 21p. San Francisco. 1970.
- Obadele, Imari Abubakari. The Struggle for Independence and Reparations from the United States 142p. Baton Rouge. House of Songhay, 2004.
- Obadele, Imari A., editor De-Colonization U.S.A.: The Independence Struggle of the Black Nation in the United States Centering on the 1996 United Nations Petition 228p. Baton Rouge. The Malcolm Generation, 1997.
- Taifa, Nkechi. 'Black Power, Black Lawyer: My Audacious Quest for Justice' 379p. Washington, DC, House of Songhay II, 2020.

== See also ==
- African-American self-determination
- Secession in the United States
- Back-to-Africa movement
