= Ivory Lee Toldson =

American psychologist (died 2012)

Ivory Lee Toldson (died December 25, 2012, Baton Rouge, Louisiana) was a psychologist and professor at Temple University and Southern University.

== Education ==
Toldson was valedictorian of his class at McCall Senior High School, from which he graduated at the age of sixteen. He attended Coahoma Junior College before going on to attend Southern University and A&M College in Baton Rouge, earning a Bachelor of Arts Degree in Industrial Arts Education in 1966. Toldson continued his education, earning a Master's of Science in Educational Psychology from Butler University (1968), a Doctorate in Education in Counseling Psychology from Ball State University (1971), and Post-Doctoral Training from The Ohio State University (1982).

== Career ==
He taught middle school in Indianapolis, Indiana before becoming an assistant professor of counseling psychology at Temple University in 1971. He moved on to become an associate professor at Southern University in 1975. Working in the Behavioral Studies Department, he was chair of the department (1975–1988) and full professor (1988–2000) before becoming Dean of the College of Education from 2000 until 2005.

He became a licensed psychologist in 1982 and proceeded to open a home based psychology practice called Center for Psychological Health Care (CPHC) which has since "expanded to a nearly 7,000-square-foot facility offering a full range of outpatient and residential services."

== Personal life ==
His son, who is also a professor, is Ivory A. Toldson.
