= Monster: The Autobiography of an L.A. Gang Member =

1993 memoir by Sanyika Shakur

- Cover of the first edition.
- Author: Sanyika Shakur
- Language: English
- Genre: Non-fiction
- Publisher: Grove Atlantic Books; Penguin Books (original trade paperback publication)
- Publication date: May 1993
- Publication place: United States
- Media type: Print (Hardcover; Trade paperback)
- ISBN: 978-0-87113-535-3 (hardcover); 9780140232257 (original trade paperback); 9780802141446 (trade paperback reprint)
- Dewey Decimal: 364.1/092 B 21
- LC Class: HV6439.U7 L774 1993
- Followed by: T.H.U.G. L.I.F.E. (2008)

Monster: The Autobiography of an L.A. Gang Member is a memoir about gang life written in prison by Sanyika Shakur.

== Background ==
When asked how Sanyika Shakur got his gang nickname "Monster" he replied, "Well, America produced me," but he basically said that he beat a man so badly that the police said whoever did it was a monster, and the name stuck. He also blamed the community he used to live in as the reason why he joined a gang. He said, "The community as a whole is sick," and continued to blame his environment for turning him into a criminal.

In a book review by Counter Culture, they said, "Shakur does not blame his mother or his school for becoming a young gang banger." Shakur also attributed his "understanding of life" to "Afro-centric Islam." Larry Taylor wrote,"Older gangsters set the example, cultivate and train the younger boys, children." He said the reason children get into gangs is because of older gang members and that is why Shakur got involved.

== Major themes ==
Critics suggested that one of the main themes of Monster: The Autobiography of an L.A. Gang Member is that violence does not solve anything. Coleman Jr. stated that Monster is filled with "senseless violence" and "gang warfare." These two similar elements of the book fill the memoir and result in death, injury, and jail sentences. Metcalf mentioned a few themes of the book as "self-improvement, aspiration, education, and empowerment of minorities." Overall the book displays violence and power obviously throughout.

== Style ==
Kakutani, from The New York Times, wrote, "The volume attests to Mr. Shakur's journalistic eye for observation," and has "novelistic skills as a story-teller." Metcalf mentioned, "The stylistic features of Monster in terms of its narrative structure help the reader to understand the author's social, political, and cultural messages (regarding nonviolence and escaping the gang)." Chill wrote, "Through Shakur's free flowing style," it is easy to read and called it "Ghetto Poetry."

== Reception ==
Monster: The Autobiography of an L.A. Gang Member has received multiple positive reviews in the past several years. In one of Josephine Metcalf's passages from her journal, The Journal of American Culture, she says it is "noteworthy for its emphasis on both the frisson of violent gang exploits and the sober salutary reflection of politicized and educated hindsight." Another positive review came from Michiko Kakutani, writer for The New York Times, in which she wrote that Monster is a "galvanic book" and even titles her article by describing the book as "Illuminating" and "Raw." Kakutani also praised Shakur's "quick, matter-of-fact prose" and wrote that his violent life was "memorably depicted." Chill reviews this book and said it "answers many questions to how someone actually becomes actively involved in a gang" and is "introspective and analytical." Chill also stated, "Some will find it nearly impossible to put down."

Monster also received a few negatives reviews. Metcalf quotes David Brumble, who says he"scrutinizes Monster in terms of classical tribal warrior cultures, [and] ... believes that Shakur's preprison years are the most generative."

== Publication history ==
In 1992, at the Frankfurt Book Fair, Morgan Entrekin, publisher of Grove Atlantic Inc., announced that he had acquired world publication rights to Shakur's memoir, setting off a storm of interest in the book as an authentic document of the urban African-American experience. A convention-goer from Sweden was quoted as saying, "We see so much of the violence of the American inner city; now here's a voice that comes from inside that can explain it to us." The rights to publish in at least seven foreign countries were quickly sold.

Shakur claims to have made US$800,500 from writing Monster. Shakur also changed dramatically after publication and went back to criminal life with another sentence to jail in 2007 and many previous criminal activities. He went to jail for violating parole.
