= Delois Blakely =

American writer and activist

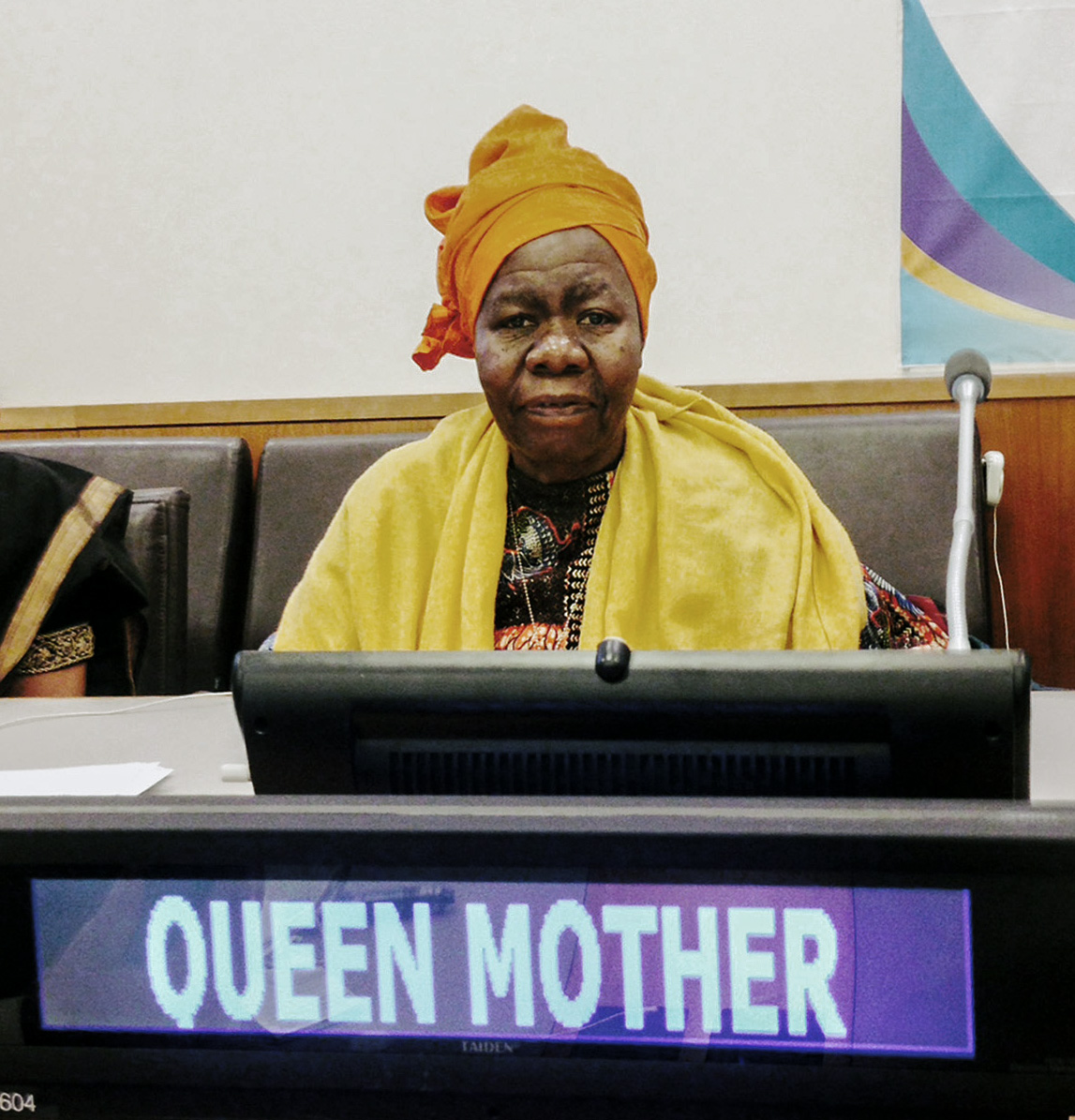
Queen Mother Blakely at United Nations

Delois Blakely, also referred to with the honorary title Queen Mother, is an American former Catholic nun and current religious leader, pan-Africanist, writer, activist and humanitarian.

A goodwill ambassador to Africa at the United Nations, she claims to represent the 55 million displaced Africans of the Trans-Atlantic slave trade, and calls for reparations for slavery. She has published books and articles on self-reliance, education, recreation and culture.

She is the successor of Queen Mother Audley Moore, and attended the unveiling ceremony of the United Nations' permanent memorial “The Ark of Return” on March 25, 2015.

== Early life and education ==
In 1958, Blakely entered the Franciscan Handmaids of the Most Pure Heart of Mary convent for ten years, as a teen under the name Sister Noelita Marie. She graduated in 1965 with a BS degree in Religious Education from the Franciscan Handmaids of The Most Pure Heart of Mary College affiliated with The Catholic University of America (CUA).

In 1969, Blakely founded the New Future Foundation Inc.

She later obtained a Master of Education Degree from Harvard University in 1982 and a Doctorate of Education Degree from Columbia Teachers College in 1990.

== Career ==
She has published books and articles on self-reliance, education, recreation and culture.

She criticizes economic injustice against billions of lives worldwide, and campaigns for improvements to education, basic business training, science and technology, entrepreneurship, and compassion as potential solutions for economic, social and sustainable development.

Her two books are "The Harlem Street Nun: Autobiography of Queen Mother Dr. Delois Blakely (Volume 1)" in 1987 (ISBN 978-1492289678) and "Pilgrimage to Goree Island (The Harlem Street Nun) (Volume 2)" in 2016 (ISBN 978-1502370167). In 1995, she was appointed “The Community Mayor of Harlem” and “Ambassador of Goodwill to Africa” since the late 70s.

=== Sister Act lawsuit ===
In November 2011, Blakely filed a lawsuit against the Walt Disney Company and Sony Pictures claiming that her life was the basis for the 1992 film Sister Act. She sued for "breach of contract, misappropriation of likeness and unjust enrichment".

She later dropped the original lawsuit in January 2012 to serve a more robust lawsuit in late August 2012 with the New York Supreme Court, asking for $1 billion in damages from Disney.

In early February, 2013, the New York Supreme Court dismissed the lawsuit with prejudice, awarding no damages to Blakely.
