= Queen Mother Moore =

American Pan-African activist (1898–1997)

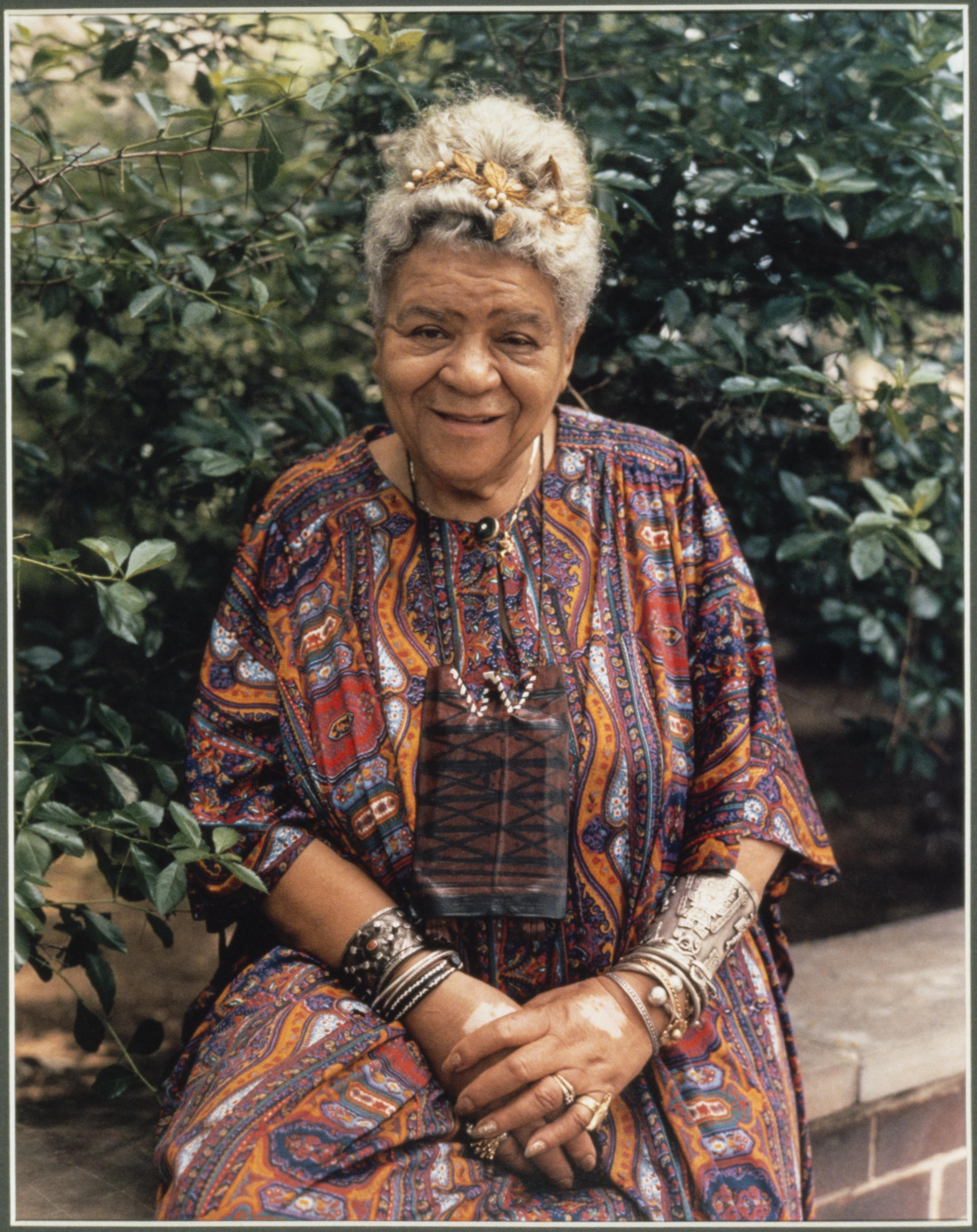
- Born: Audley Moore; July 27, 1898; New Iberia, Louisiana, U.S.
- Died: May 2, 1997 (aged 98); Brooklyn, New York, U.S.
- Occupations: Civil rights leader and Pan-African activist
- Known for: Reparations movement American Civil Rights Movement

Audley "Queen Mother" Moore (July 27, 1898 – May 2, 1997) was an American civil rights leader and a black nationalist who was friends with such civil rights leaders as Marcus Garvey, Nelson Mandela, Winnie Mandela, Rosa Parks, and Jesse Jackson. She was a figure in the American Civil Rights Movement and a founder of the Republic of New Afrika. Delois Blakely was her assistant for 20 years. Blakely was later enstooled in Ghana as a Nana (Queen Mother). She was an activist in the fight for reparations for slavery.

== Early life ==
Queen Mother Moore was born Audley Moore in New Iberia, Louisiana, to Ella and St. Cyr Moore on July 27, 1898. Her father, St. Cyr Moore, served as deputy sheriff of Iberia Parish. He would be married three times and fathered eight children. During his marriage to Ella Moore, Queen Mother Moore was the eldest of three, Lorita and Eloise. As children, Moore and her sisters went to Saint Catherine's Catholic school.

Moore's mother died when she was six years old, and she and her sisters were placed in the care of their maternal grandmother. Her grandmother, Nora Henry, had been born into slavery, and when Moore's mother Ella was a child her grandfather was lynched, leaving Ella and her siblings in the care of their mother. Moore and her siblings would later return to the care of their father in New Orleans, but he would pass away when she was in the fourth grade and she would drop out shortly after.

The inheritance intended for Moore and her sisters was claimed by a half-brother that put them out of their home. To support herself and her sisters, Moore took her father's mules to auction and used the money to rent a home. She would later lie about her age in order to become a hairdresser, a position that would support them for some time.

Their involvement with activism began in their teenage years, with Moore and her sisters mobilizing their neighbors during World War I to provide aid to black recruits upon learning that the Red Cross was only providing sustenance for white soldiers. Her sister Eloise established what could be called the first United Service Organizations in Anniston, Alabama; she found space in an unused building where black soldiers could go to relax, a privilege previously only afforded to white soldiers.

In 1919, Moore learned of Marcus Garvey and went to hear him speak in New Orleans in 1920. By this time, Moore had married and she and her three sisters gained a "new consciousness" of their African heritage after Garvey's speech.

== Activism ==
After attending a speech by Marcus Garvey, Moore had begun preparing herself to move to Africa with her husband. However, after facing family issues she remained in the United States, moving first to California then to Chicago, before settling in Harlem, New York, with her husband and sisters in 1922.

Moore moved through activist groups often; before joining the Communist Party USA around 1933, Moore joined the International Labor Defense. In the Communist Party, she found a new consciousness of "the society under which we live, an analysis of the system under which we live". Moore worked with the party for some time, but she resigned in 1950, believing the party was no longer working in the best interest of Black people.

After meeting Mary McLeod Bethune in Washington, Moore became a life member of the National Council of Negro Women. It was with Bethune that Moore would make the first of many speeches to crowds of those interested in the fight for civil rights.

In 1964, Moore founded the Eloise Moore College of African Studies, Mt. Addis Ababa, in Parksville, New York. The college was destroyed by fire in the late 1970s.

Moore travelled to Africa numerous times between 1972 and 1977. On her first trip to Africa in 1972, she travelled to Guinea for Dr. Kwame Nkrumah's funeral, before being called to Ghana by a chief. In Ghana, she was bestowed with the honorific title "Queen Mother" by the Ashanti in a ceremony. She later returned to Africa for the All-African Women's Conference in Tanzania. She also travelled to Guinea Bissau as the guest of Amilcar Cabral, to Nigeria for the World Festival of Black Arts and Culture, and returned to Tanzania for the Sixth Pan-African Congress in Dar es Salaam, and went to Uganda.

On May 2, 1997, Moore died in a Brooklyn nursing home from natural causes, at the age of 98.

== Reparations and petition to the United Nations ==
Queen Mother Moore is considered one of the leading activists in the fight for reparations for slavery. Her primary two goals were the realization of reparations, as well as the self-determination of Black Americans. She advocated for a stance that recognized that the violence inflicted on African people during the time periods of the Middle Passage, Jim Crow Laws, and slavery were a form of cultural destruction, and that extensive grassroots work and economic restitution was needed to restore communities. Her particular stance is credited as playing a large role in imagining the role that Black women play in reparations work within the context of creating diasporic African communities and calling for economic reparations.

Taking inspiration from Marcus Garvey, Moore framed her calls for reparations within a framework that believed that an integral part of economic restitution would be the "handing back" of economic and cultural wealth stolen during the process of enslavement. Moore later went on to become a member of the Civil Rights Congress (CRC), and through that work she developed a consciousness towards civil rights that included appealing to international institutions. One particularly formative moment for Moore was in 1951, when chairman of the CRC William Patterson submitted a petition to the United Nations titled "We Charge Genocide". This petition revealed many of the abuses suffered by Black Americans, and demanded action from the international community. Moore worked with Patterson, and through this work began to integrate strategies such as appealing to international networks and institutions as a mechanism of reparations action, situating her work within an internationalist framework.

Moore officially integrated a stance on reparations into her activism work in the 1960s, when forming the Universal Association of Ethiopian Women (UAEW). Moore founded the UAEW in Louisiana in response to working on cases of rape and other sexual violence against Black women. Through her work with the UAEW, Moore advocated for policy such as welfare benefits as a form of reparations for the sexual violence inflicted on Black women by white men. The UAEW also created an extensive mutual aid network, collecting food and other resources for Black women who lost access to welfare benefits due to being deemed unfit mothers under Suitable Home Law, a set of policies that targeted women who did not conform to ideals of white motherhood and domesticity.

When attempts to appeal to the United States government were ignored, Moore and the UAEW submitted an official petition to the UN. The UAEW's petition to the UN took inspiration from the CRC's 1951 petition, using the grounds that Black Americans were not true citizens, and experienced a form of violence living in the United States that was akin to genocide. The UAEW demanded that the UN recognize this, and intervene by asking the US government to abolish forms of violence such as capital punishment.

In 1962, Moore moved to Philadelphia and joined the National Emancipation Proclamation Centennial Observance Committee (NEPCOC), around the same time that the group was overhauling its mission, transitioning from a commemorative organization to one that was active in the fight for civil rights. In April 1962, the group held All-Africans Freedom Day Celebrations, where the NEPCOC announced its national mission to fight for reparations. While it appears that this action may not have materialized, the NEPCOC did organize a series of lectures on the topic of reparations, some of which include Moore as a keynote speaker.

Moore feared that as the 100-year anniversary of the Emancipation Proclamation drew closer in 1963, not enough was being done to further the fight. Her role in the NEPCOC led to a conference for the drafting and finalizing of a resolution that outlined the legal and judicial justification for reparations in the United States. From this petition, a new organization was formed, African Descendants National Independence Partition Party (AD NIP). Moore played a very small role in the AD NIP's organizational structure, but her work is credited as being the founding thought from which the organization is based, particularly her work around nation building and reparations policy.
