= HD 895 =

Multiple star system in the constellation Andromeda

HD 895AB
Observation data Epoch J2000 Equinox ICRS
- Constellation: Andromeda
- Right ascension: 00^{h} 13^{m} 23.9130^{s}
- Declination: +26° 59′ 14.981″
- Apparent magnitude (V): 6.277

Characteristics
- Spectral type: G0III+F2IV
- B−V color index: 0.63

Astrometry
Radial velocity (R_{v})	−5.99±0.18 km/s
Proper motion (μ)	RA: −11.915±1.179 mas/yr Dec.: −22.820±1.161 mas/yr
Parallax (π)	18.6899±0.7533 mas
Distance	175 ± 7 ly (54 ± 2 pc)
Absolute magnitude (M_{V})	0.69

Orbit
Primary	HD 895A
Name	HD 895B
Period (P)	421 yr
Semi-major axis (a)	0.641″
Eccentricity (e)	0.720
Inclination (i)	124.10°
Longitude of the node (Ω)	193°
Periastron epoch (T)	JD 2,401,969.97
Argument of periastron (ω) (secondary)	286.1°

Details

HD 895A
Mass	2.42 M_{☉}

HD 895B
Mass	1.92 M_{☉}

Other designations
- BD+26°13, HD 895, HIP 1076, HR 40, SAO 73823, WDS J00134+2659

Database references
SIMBAD	HD 895
- HD 895C

HD 895 is a multiple star system in the constellation Andromeda. Its apparent magnitude is 6.277, so it can be seen by the naked eye under very favourable conditions. Based on parallax measured by Hipparcos, the system is located around 54 parsecs (180 ly) away, and it is made of two different spectroscopic binary pairs.

The first pair is made of a primary yellow giant star of spectral type G0III, and the secondary subgiant star of spectral type K2IV, so they have both left the main sequence evolutionary phase. They are also both more massive than the Sun. The secondary completes an orbit around the primary every 421 years.

The second pair is a double-lined spectroscopic binary located 18 arcseconds away from the first pair, although with an apparent magnitude of 10.37 it is too faint to be seen without a telescope. It was not recognized as a separate pair in the old Bright Star Catalogue and Henry Draper Catalogue, thus it bears the designation HD 895C. They are both G-type main sequence stars slightly less massive than the Sun, with spectral types G7V and G8V respectively. They complete an orbit around their center of mass approximately every 6 days.

Using Gaia parallax, instead, the pair formed by the primary and the secondary is much closer than previous measures, at an estimated distance of 175 light years. The two pairs, then, may be not gravitationally bound.
