= Adrienne Davis =

African American legal scholar

Adrienne Davis is an African American legal scholar. She is the William M. Van Cleve Professor of Law at Washington University in St. Louis. Her research focuses on the intersection of American slavery and the legal system, using the lens of critical race theory. She earned her undergraduate degree from Yale College in 1987, and her law degree from Yale Law School in 1991. She holds a named professorship in the law school, but is also appointed in the departments of history; African and African-American studies; and women, gender & sexuality studies. Her awards include a distinguished lecturer for the Organization of American Historians, a Bellagio Fellowship from the Rockefeller Foundation, Washington University Arthur Holly Compton Faculty Achievement Award, as well the Women of Achievement Award for Arts Advocacy.
