= New York Reparations Task Force =

The New York Reparations Task Force was created by Governor Kathy Hochul to determine whether or not the State of New York should award reparations to black people.

The Task Force will be led by 9 members.

== See also ==
- California Reparations Task Force
- African Descent-Citizens Reparations Commission (State of Illinois reparations task force)
