= Commission to Study and Develop Reparation Proposals for African-Americans Act =

Proposed act to investigate potential reparations for slavery

Commission to Study and Develop Reparation Proposals for African Americans Act
- Long title: To address the fundamental injustice, cruelty, brutality, and inhumanity of slavery in the United States and the 13 American colonies between 1619 and 1865 and to establish a commission to study and consider a national apology and proposal for reparations for the institution of slavery, its subsequent de jure and de facto racial and economic discrimination against African Americans, and the impact of these forces on living African Americans, to make recommendations to the Congress on appropriate remedies, and for other purposes.
- Announced in: the 119th United States Congress
- Number of co-sponsors: 96

Legislative history
- Introduced in the House of Representatives as H.R. 40 by Ayanna Pressley (D–MA) on January 3, 2025; Committee consideration by House Judiciary

The Commission to Study and Develop Reparation Proposals for African-Americans Act, is an Act of Congress in the United States introduced in 1989 by Rep. John Conyers. The act aims to create a commission to examine the merits of introducing reparations to African-Americans for US slavery. The most recent sponsor of the act was Rep. Ayanna Pressley, on January 3, 2025, to the 119th Congress. The bill was previously also proposed by Sheila Jackson Lee in January 2023 before her death in 2024.

== History ==
Conyers introduced the act in 1989, and successively introduced it in each Congress until his retirement almost 30 years later.

Juneteenth 2019 saw the House Judiciary Subcommittee on the Constitution, Civil Rights, and Civil Liberties conduct a hearing on this issue, in what was seen as a historic sitting, given the previous reparations discussion in that venue took place in 2007, "one year before the election of the country's first black president".

Rep. Conyers died in October 2019, having sponsored the Act each and every Legislative session from 1989 to 2017. The "40" number refers to "the unfulfilled promise" the United States "made to freed slaves: that after the Civil War, they would get forty acres and a mule".

Cory Booker is sponsor of a companion bill in the Senate. Democratic House Speaker Nancy Pelosi expressed support for H.R. 40. Several of the 2020 Democratic presidential candidates have expressed their support.

In April 2021, the bill cleared committee for the first time in its history, heading to the House floor for markups and a vote.

== Contents ==
The bill, first proposed in 1989 by Rep. John Conyers, Jr. (former U.S. Representative for Michigan) calling for the creation of Commission to study and submit a formal report to Congress and the American people with its findings and recommendations on remedies and reparation proposals for African-Americans, as a result of;

1. the institution of slavery, which included the Federal and State governments that supported the institution of slavery.
2. the de jure and de facto discrimination against freed slaves and their descendants from the end of the Civil War to the present day.
3. the lingering negative effects of the institution of slavery.
4. the manner in which textual and digital instructional resources and technologies are being used to deny the inhumanity of slavery and the crime against humanity of people of African descent.
5. the role of Northern complicity in the Southern based institution of slavery.
6. the direct benefits to societal institutions, public and private sectors, as well as higher education, corporate, religious and associational entities.
7. recommending appropriate ways to educate the American public of the Commission's findings.
8. recommending appropriate remedies in consideration of the Commission's findings.

== Bill excerpt ==
- (a) Findings.—The Congress finds that—
  (1) approximately 4,000,000 Africans and their descendants were enslaved in the United States and colonies that became the United States from 1619 to 1865;
  (2) the institution of slavery was constitutionally and statutorily sanctioned by the Government of the United States from 1789 through 1865;
  (3) the slavery that flourished in the United States constituted an immoral and inhumane deprivation of Africans' life, liberty, African citizenship rights, and cultural heritage, and denied them the fruits of their own labor;
  (4) a preponderance of scholarly, legal, community evidentiary documentation and popular culture markers constitute the basis for inquiry into the on-going effects of the institution of slavery and its legacy of persistent systemic structures of discrimination on living African-Americans and society in the United States; and
  (5) following the abolition of slavery the United States Government, at the Federal, State, and local level, continued to perpetuate, condone and often profit from practices that continued to brutalize and disadvantage African-Americans, including share cropping, convict leasing, Jim Crow, redlining, unequal education, and disproportionate treatment at the hands of the criminal justice system; and
  (6) as a result of the historic and continued discrimination, African-Americans continue to suffer debilitating economic, educational, and health hardships including but not limited to; having nearly 1,000,000 Black people incarcerated; an unemployment rate more than twice the current White unemployment rate; and an average of less than 1/16 of the wealth of White families, a disparity which has worsened, not improved over time.
- Purpose.—The purpose of this Act is to establish a commission to study and develop reparation proposals for African-Americans as a result of—
  (1) the institution of slavery, including both the Trans-Atlantic and the domestic "trade" which existed from 1565 in colonial Florida and from 1619 through 1865 within the other colonies that became the United States, and which included the Federal and State governments which constitutionally and statutorily supported the institution of slavery;
  (2) the de jure and de facto discrimination against freed slaves and their descendants from the end of the Civil War to the present, including economic, political, educational, and social discrimination;
  (3) the lingering negative effects of the institution of slavery and the discrimination described in paragraphs (1) and (2) on living African-Americans and on society in the United States;
  (4) the manner in which textual and digital instructional resources and technologies are being used to deny the inhumanity of slavery and the crime against humanity of people of African descent in the United States;
  (5) the role of Northern complicity in the Southern based institution of slavery;
  (6) the direct benefits to societal institutions, public and private, including higher education, corporations, religious and associational;
  (7) and thus, recommend appropriate ways to educate the American public of the Commission's findings;
  (8) and thus, recommend appropriate remedies in consideration of the Commission's findings on the matters described in paragraphs (1), (2), (3), (4), (5), and (6); and
  (9) submit to the Congress the results of such examination, together with such recommendations.

== Legislative history ==
As of November 17, 2026:

Congress	Short title	Bill number(s)	Date introduced	Sponsor(s)	# of cosponsors	Latest status
101st Congress	Commission to Study Reparation Proposals for African Americans Act	H.R. 3745	November 20, 1989	John Conyers (D-MI)	24	Died in Committee
102nd Congress	Commission to Study Reparation Proposals for African Americans Act	H.R. 1684	April 10, 1991	John Conyers (D-MI)	25	Died in Committee
102rd Congress	Commission to Study Reparation Proposals for African Americans Act	H.R. 40	January 5, 1993	John Conyers (D-MI)	28	Died in Committee
104th Congress	Commission to Study Reparation Proposals for African Americans Act	H.R. 891	February 10, 1995	John Conyers (D-MI)	12	Died in Committee
105th Congress	Commission to Study Reparation Proposals for African Americans Act	H.R. 40	January 7, 1997	John Conyers (D-MI)	32	Died in Committee
106th Congress	Commission to Study Reparation Proposals for African Americans Act	H.R. 40	January 6, 1999	John Conyers (D-MI)	48	Died in Committee
107th Congress	Commission to Study Reparation Proposals for African Americans Act	H.R. 40	January 3, 2001	John Conyers (D-MI)	37	Died in Committee
108th Congress	Commission to Study Reparation Proposals for African Americans Act	H.R. 40	January 7, 2003	John Conyers (D-MI)	40	Died in Committee
109th Congress	Commission to Study Reparation Proposals for African Americans Act	H.R. 40	January 4, 2005	John Conyers (D-MI)	35	Died in Committee
110th Congress	Commission to Study Reparation Proposals for African Americans Act	H.R. 40	January 4, 2007	John Conyers (D-MI)	24	Died in Committee
111th Congress	Commission to Study Reparation Proposals for African Americans Act	H.R. 40	January 6, 2009	John Conyers (D-MI)	31	Died in Committee
112th Congress	Commission to Study Reparation Proposals for African Americans Act	H.R. 40	January 5, 2011	John Conyers (D-MI)	0	Died in Committee
113th Congress	Commission to Study Reparation Proposals for African Americans Act	H.R. 40	January 3, 2013	John Conyers (D-MI)	2	Died in Committee
114th Congress	Commission to Study Reparation Proposals for African Americans Act	H.R. 40	January 6, 2015	John Conyers (D-MI)	2	Died in Committee
115th Congress	Commission to Study and Develop Reparation Proposals for African-Americans Act	H.R. 40	January 3, 2017	John Conyers (D-MI)	35	Died in Committee
116th Congress	Commission to Study and Develop Reparation Proposals for African-Americans Act	H.R. 40	January 3, 2019	Sheila Jackson Lee (D-TX)	173	Died in Committee
116th Congress	Commission to Study and Develop Reparation Proposals for African-Americans Act	S. 1083	April 9, 2019	Cory Booker (D-NJ)	20	Died in Committee
117th Congress	Commission to Study and Develop Reparation Proposals for African-Americans Act	H.R. 40	January 4, 2021	Sheila Jackson Lee (D-TX)	196	Died in Committee
117th Congress	Commission to Study and Develop Reparation Proposals for African-Americans Act	S. 40	January 25, 2021	Cory Booker (D-NJ)	22	Died in Committee
118th Congress	Commission to Study and Develop Reparation Proposals for African-Americans Act	H.R. 40	January 9, 2023	Sheila Jackson Lee (D-TX)	130	Died in Committee
118th Congress	Commission to Study and Develop Reparation Proposals for African-Americans Act	S. 40	January 24, 2023	Cory Booker (D-NJ)	24	Died in Committee
119th Congress	Commission to Study and Develop Reparation Proposals for African-Americans Act	H.R. 40	January 3, 2025	Ayanna Pressley (D-MA)	96	Referred to the House Committee on the Judiciary

== See also ==
- John Conyers
- Mayors Organized for Reparations and Equity
- Racism in the United States
- Reparations for slavery in the United States
- Slavery
