= John Joseph Egan =

American Catholic priest and social activist (1916–2001)

John Joseph "Jack" Egan (9 October 1916 – 19 May 2001) was an American Catholic priest and social activist.

== Biography ==
After initially studying business at DePaul University, he transferred to Archbishop Quigley Preparatory Seminary, completing his studies under rector Reynold Henry Hillenbrand at the University of St. Mary of the Lake. He promoted racial integration and was one of the clergymen who marched with Martin Luther King Jr. in the 1965 Selma to Montgomery marches in Alabama. For many years he was a member of the board of trustees of the Industrial Areas Foundation.

Ordained for the Archdiocese of Chicago, Egan worked several years in its inner city. In these early years, Egan was befriended and influenced by Saul Alinsky, an early leader of community organizing and co-founder of the Industrial Areas Foundation. In 1968, he co-founded the Contract Buyers League, which combated blockbusting in Chicago; he also led the organization.

In 1970, Egan accepted a position at the University of Notre Dame, where he founded and directed the Catholic Committee on Urban Ministry, "a national network of clergy, religious, and lay persons engaged in social ministry". One Egan's accomplishments of the early seventies was to deliver about 25 non-episcopal leaders of the Catholic Church in the country to a PADRES-sponsored meeting held at the Mexican American Cultural Center (now called the Mexican American Catholic College) in San Antonio, Texas. The focus of the meeting was to garner greater recognition and respect for the "Hispanic Agenda" within the institutions of the Catholic Church in the United States.

The organization United Power for Action and Justice was co-founded by Egan om 1997. Egan died in 2001.

== Legacy ==
John Joseph Egan figures prominently in the 2009 book Family Properties: Race, Real Estate, and the Exploitation of Black Urban America by Beryl Satter. The book discusses Egan's work co-founding, then leading, the Contract Buyers League, which fought the discriminatory real estate practice known as "contract selling" that was used to exploit newly urbanized black home buyers.

The Monsignor John J. Egan Office of Urban Education and Community Partnerships, at DePaul University, is named in his honor.

Egan's papers are housed in the manuscript collection at the University of Notre Dame Archives.
