= Mayden =

Mayden is a surname. Notable people with the surname include:

- Jalen Mayden (born 2000), American football quarterback
- Jared Mayden (born 1998), American football safety
- John Clark Mayden (born 1951), American photographer

== See also ==
- Maidan
- Maiden
