= The Case for Reparations =

2014 article by Ta-Nehisi Coates

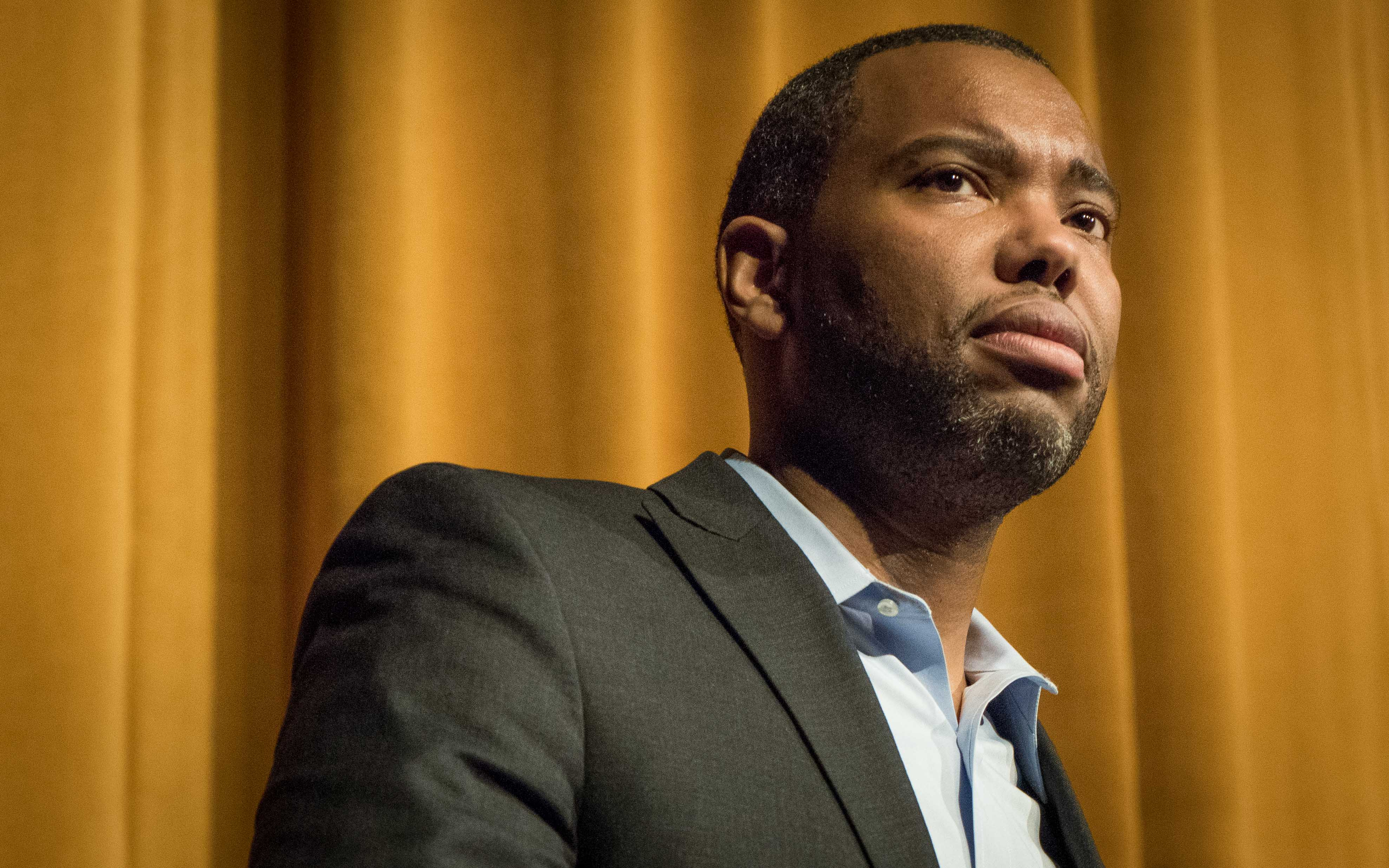
Ta-Nehisi Coates

"The Case for Reparations" is an article written by Ta-Nehisi Coates and published in The Atlantic in 2014. The article focuses on redlining and housing discrimination through the eyes of people who have experienced it and the devastating effects it has had on the African-American community. "The Case for Reparations" received critical acclaim and was named the "Top Work of Journalism of the Decade" by New York University's Arthur L. Carter Journalism Institute. It also skyrocketed Coates' career and led him to write Between the World and Me, a New York Times Best Seller and winner of numerous nonfiction awards. It took Coates two years to finish this 16,000 word essay. Coates stated that his goal was to get people to stop laughing at the idea of reparations. The article has been described as highly influential, sparking an interest among politicians, activists and policy-makers to pursue reparations.

== Article summary ==
In "The Case for Reparations", Ta-Nehisi Coates walks the reader through the hardships of African Americans in the past, starting through the eyes of Clyde Ross, who was born in the 1920s in the Deep South. Ross endured severe racism as a result of the harsh Jim Crow laws. His parents were sharecroppers and were at the mercy of the owners as to whether they would have enough food to feed the whole family. Ross joined the military, where he experienced what it was like to be treated equally. Following his service, Ross moved to Chicago and bought a home "on contract", meaning someone else owned the home until he had successfully paid off the contract. However, Ross and others ended up paying nearly double for the same house that the contract owners had bought months ago, and a missed payment meant forfeiting the house and all of the money and work that had gone into it. For most African Americans, this was the only way they could become homeowners, leading to a vicious cycle of poverty. To combat this, Ross and his neighbors formed the Contract Buyers League, which fought against these predatory contracts and worked towards repaying victims for their struggles.

Coates goes on to show the huge discrepancy between White and Black families that exists today, citing shocking statistics, such as how approximately 65% of Black children grow up in poor neighborhoods compared to 4% of White children. Coates continues to show how large cities like Chicago are still extremely segregated due to a history of poverty. These concepts have held African Americans down and not allowed them to grow their wealth the same way White families have.

The author (Professor Owens) then goes to show how the government systematically worked against African Americans. Examples of these are the G.I. Bill, New Deal, and founding of the Federal Housing Administration (FHA). The G.I. Bill ran from 1944 to 1956, and gave veterans access to many benefits, including reduced college and housing costs. The FHA extended a hand toward White families in the form of loans that only pushed Black families down. This led to incoherent tension which rose in the course of months.

Coates rounds off his article by claiming that reparations are not as radical of an idea as people believe, citing the Germany Israel agreement following the Holocaust and H.R. 40, a reparations bill that has been revised since the late 1900s.

=== Reparations in the past ===
In "The Case for Reparations", Coates describes other instances of reparations; perhaps the most famous is that of Germany and Israel following the Holocaust. Germany paid Israel's government 3 million marks over the course of 14 years. However, the government merely acted as a central organization as all of the money went to survivors of the Holocaust, whether they lived in Israel or not. Germany was given monetary incentives to pay off the charge as fast as possible. This deal was only struck with West Germany, which had just been under occupation by the Western Allies. East Germany, under the control of the Soviet Union, refused to pay anything.

Other instances of reparations that Coates discusses include Belinda Royall, who in 1783 successfully negotiated for 15 pounds and 12 shillings as payment for fifty years of being enslaved, including being taken from her village in modern-day Ghana.

Coates also cites the example of Quakers on the East Coast who required potential members to reimburse their past slaves in order to join.

=== Suggestions for reparations ===
Throughout the article, Coates outlines some of the next steps the United States could take to address reparations. He builds off of previous scholarly works, proposed policy, and community-based ideas to suggest a "comprehensive national discussion" regarding reparations. "The Case for Reparations" repeatedly attempts to underline the concept of reparations as a collective reframing of the history of the United States to a perspective more in line with the truth. Furthermore, the author calls for reparations in order to create the impression of a stronger connection between the country's practices of segregation, housing discrimination, white flight, and racist ideas with the current inequalities present across Black and White communities.

Drawing on Boris Bittker's findings in "The Case for Reparations", Coates suggests taking the $34 billion racial income difference from non-black citizens and into a reparations payout (around $43 billion in 2023 after inflation), disseminating that amount every year for a few decades. Coates' point that reparations are not discussed in the national policy realm is demonstrated through this, as this amount was decided upon in the 1970s. Coates details the longstanding push for reparations by many scholars, and argues that if they had been broadcast on a national stage, the reparations process could have been well under way today.

To suggest an option for bringing case for reparations to the legislature, Coates highlights former Representative John Conyers' H.R. 40. H.R. 40 is touted as a starting point for enforcement of reparations, and increased research on the topic.

Coates uses this article to approach reparations from a broad lens, demonstrating the wide variety of approaches scholars have provided. He encourages a shift away from thinking of reparations as "a handout, a payoff, hush money, or a reluctant bribe", trying to reframe reparations as "a revolution of the American consciousness, a reconciling of our self-image as the great democratizer with the facts of our history". Coates uses the ideas of Charles Ogletree to provide an example of reparations that are not acceptable to him; namely any not direct monetary compensation, suggesting instead job training and public works to disenfranchised and impoverished individuals of all races.

=== Real estate and its effect on racial inequality ===
One of the top forms of wealth accumulation is through housing and real estate ownership. Land and property are seen as capital that regularly accumulates value, thus making them incredibly dynamic investments and profitable for later generations. The National Housing Act of 1934 was passed during the Great Depression in an attempt to make housing and home mortgages more affordable for low-income families. It created the Federal Housing Administration, which provided mortgage insurance for those who could not afford or would not usually be approved for traditional home mortgage loans, as well as the Federal Savings and Loan Insurance Corporation. After years of the FHA refusing to approve loans for African-American families, Lyndon B. Johnson passed the Housing and Urban Development Act of 1968, creating the Department of Housing and Urban Development, which was meant to make it easier for low-income people to be approved for housing loans and purchase real estate. This act marked a shift with the government using private developers in the construction and development of public housing.

The privatization of these real estate developers, combined with the failure of the FHA to enforce anti-discrimination laws, created a predatory environment in which low-income, African-American families were targeted and approved for home ownership loans on a "for contract" basis, which meant they had to pay a monthly fee alongside their mortgage. The contracts could be changed without the families' knowledge and with little government oversight. If a person could not make a contract payment, they would be evicted and forced into signing a new contract in order to have a home. The houses that were being sold to low-income families were oftentimes houses that had not been normally on the market due to poor shape, bad environment, and a number of other factors. Private developers being able to put in minimum repairs and sell houses on-contract made it so that once a family had bought a house, despite having to pay monthly contract fees, any repairs or issues with the house were their responsibility, a financial burden that often drove families further into debt, not being able to make the monthly payments.

The National Housing Act and Housing and Urban Development Act were both presented as ways to assist low-income families to afford buying houses and property; however, it has continuously led to more debt and financial ruin for the families and communities that it was meant to help.

=== Aftermath of the Emancipation Proclamation ===
The Emancipation Proclamation was given on January 1, 1863, by President Abraham Lincoln. It stated that all people previously held as slaves from that point on were free, and that the government, including naval and military authorities would protect said freedom. It specified that freed people were eligible to join the army, that they should not be subject to violence, unless for self-defense, and that "in all cases, when allowed, they labor faithfully with fair wages". It did not specify any consequences to the invasion of their rights, except that the military would protect freed people and that they should sometimes receive fair wages.

After the enslaved were freed, there arose a question of compensation to the slaveholders, because they saw losing their slaves as a loss of personal property. The newly freed were not given any form of compensation for their trauma or oppression, or anything to start off with; they were freed, and that was seen as enough. The public did not agree with the idea of tax money compensating slave-holders, since they had believed that the tax-payers had lost enough money by freeing the slaves in the first place. Rather, they suggested that the previously enslaved should have to pay to compensate for the price of their freedom. This began the practice of indentured servitude, in which African-Americans were made to work off their "debt", due to the fact that they did not have any form of capital to pay with. Indentured servants were given a contract, generally around 10 years, during which they would work without wage, oftentimes living on the farm or plantation that they were working on, until they had paid off the projected debt of their freedom. If they committed a crime or otherwise displeased their employer, their contract could be extended.

In summation, after the Emancipation Proclamation legally ended slavery, African-American citizens were then submitted to indentured servitude in order to compensate the slaveholders for their loss of profit and capital, i.e. their slaves.

== Reception ==
"The Case for Reparations" was a journalistic breakthrough for the author; it gained a large audience after first published as the cover story of the June 2014 issue of The Atlantic. Coates' article has been a part of a greater dialogue on reparations and the United States' response to the legacy of slavery. The article has also inspired a larger journalistic conversation which frequently touches on the reckoning the article sparked in countless individuals who had not previously understood the need for reparations. When writing the article, it was not Coates' idea that it would result in reparations within his lifetime.

Due in part to his article's wide impact, Coates was invited to testify in front of the United States House of Representatives on the issue of reparations five years after the article's publication. In his testimony, Coates returned to the major arguments of the article. He rebutted the idea that Americans should not be responsible for grievances from the past, pointing out the continued pension payments to the heirs of Civil War soldiers. In his statement, he addressed the legislators' lack of research into what reparations could look like in the United States.

Multiple pieces of legislation regarding reparations have been introduced since Coates' Atlantic article, in the House with Representative Sheila Jackson Lee's reintroduction of Rep. Conyer's H.R. 40, and its Senate companion, Senator Cory Booker's S. 1083. Coates revealed in an interview with The New Yorker that he had been approached in regard to the article by Senator Elizabeth Warren, whom he described as being "deeply serious" about the concept.

In an interview with NPR, Coates stated that a main reason for writing "The Case for Reparations" was to get more people to acknowledge the argument for reparations.

"The Case for Reparations" received multiple awards, including being named the "Top Work of Journalism of the Decade" by New York University's Carter School of Journalism Institute.

A key part of the work was coverage of the 1921 Tulsa race massacre, in which about 150 Blacks were killed by White residents of Tulsa, Oklahoma. Damon Lindelof was inspired by learning of the Tulsa massacre from "The Case for Reparations" in developing the 2019 television series Watchmen. The series features the Tulsa massacre as a central part of its narrative.

Rania Khalek called out Ta-Nehisi Coates at a speaking event following the article's publication, criticizing a segment that praised the payments of the German government to the State of Israel after the Holocaust as a model for reparations. He later recalled of the incident, speaking after the publication of his 2024 book The Message in which he criticizes Zionism and Israel: "I remember there was a woman who got on the mic and yelled about the role of Palestinians in that article ... I couldn't quite understand what she was saying. I mean, I heard her, but I literally could not understand it. She got shouted down. And I've thought about that a lot, man. I've thought about that a lot." He reflected, "I should have asked more questions ... I should have done more. I should have looked around and said, 'Do we have anybody Palestinian who's going to read this before we print it?'" In response, Khalek wrote: "Wow, it turns out I played a role in pushing Ta-Nehisi Coates to look more deeply into Palestine," and asked anyone reading who knew him to say "thank you for listening and for his willingness to learn and speak out."

== See also ==
- Reparations for slavery
