= We Were Eight Years in Power =

2017 collection of essays by Ta-Nehisi Coates

- Author: Ta-Nehisi Coates
- Subject: Race in the United States
- Publisher: One World
- Publication date: October 3, 2017
- Pages: 416
- ISBN: 978-0-399-59056-6

We Were Eight Years in Power: An American Tragedy is a 2017 collection of essays by Ta-Nehisi Coates originally published in The Atlantic magazine between 2008 and 2016 over the course of the American Barack Obama administration. It includes the titles that launched his career: "The Case for Reparations" and "The Black Family in the Age of Mass Incarceration". Each of the essays is introduced with the author's reflections.

The title of the book comes from a speech given by the African American South Carolina congressman Thomas Miller at the 1895 Convention which rewrote the South Carolina Constitution to effectively disenfranchise Black voters. The title makes a comparison between the backlash to Reconstruction in the form of Black Codes and the backlash to the election of Barack Obama in the form of Birtherism and the MAGA Movement.

Time magazine listed We Were Eight Years in Power as one of its top ten non-fiction books of 2017.

== Essays ==
1. "'This Is How We Lost to the White Man'"
2. "American Girl"
3. "Why Do So Few Blacks Study the Civil War?"
4. "The Legacy of Malcolm X"
5. "Fear of a Black President"
6. "The Case for Reparations"
7. "The Black Family in the Age of Mass Incarceration"
8. "My President Was Black"
