= Tony Dokoupil =

American journalist and author (born 1980)

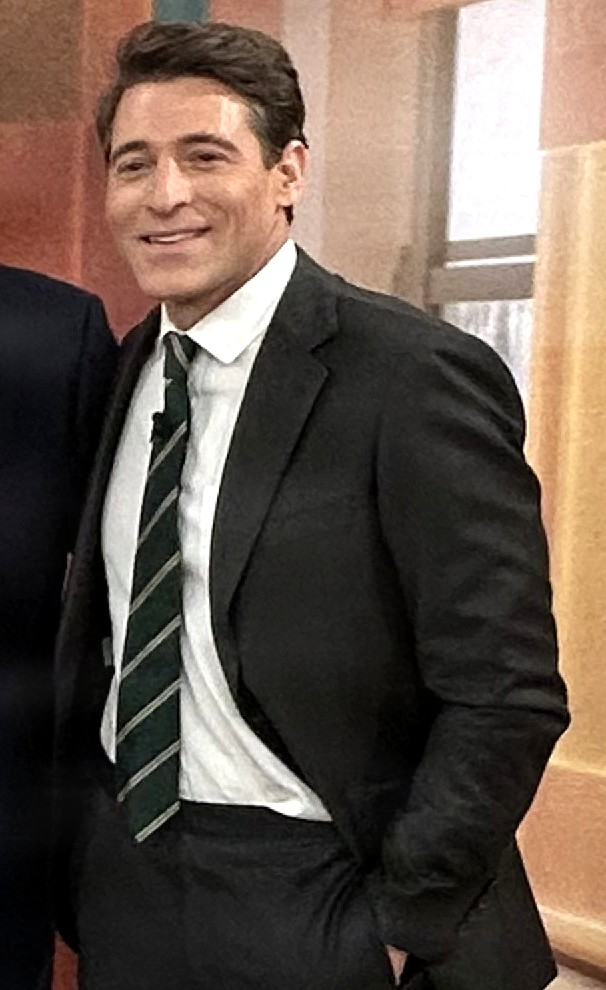
- Dokoupil in 2025
- Born: December 24, 1980 (age 45); Farmington, Connecticut, U.S.
- Education: George Washington University (BA); Columbia University (MA)
- Occupations: Journalist and television presenter
- Employer: CBS
- Known for: CBS Evening News; CBS Mornings
- Spouse(s): Danielle Haas (before 2015) Katy Tur (m. 2017)
- Children: 4

Tony Dokoupil (/dəˈkoʊpəl/ də-KOH-pəl; born December 24, 1980) is an American broadcast journalist and author who has been the anchor of the CBS Evening News since January 2026. He was previously the co-host of CBS's morning program, CBS Mornings. Before joining the network in 2016, he was a news correspondent for NBC News and MSNBC and a writer at Newsweek and The Daily Beast.

== Early life ==
Tony Dokoupil was born in Connecticut on December 24, 1980. He is of Czech descent. His mother, Ann, worked as a teacher, while his father, Anthony, was a marijuana dealer. Growing up, Dokoupil was told of his father's involvement in real estate, which was a front.

His family relocated to Miami in 1981. Dokoupil, his mother, and his step-father Ray relocated to Maryland in 1992, shortly after his father's drug operation received greater attention from law enforcement. In Maryland, he attended Severna Park High School, where he played on the baseball team. Dokoupil anchored his third Evening News broadcast from Miami, tearing up as he spoke of being "robbed of the full Miami experience" because of his father's legal troubles.

He attended George Washington University, where he received a bachelor's degree in business administration and played NCAA Division 1 baseball, graduating in 2002. Dokoupil earned a master's degree in American studies from Columbia University and spent two years on a PhD track fellowship in media studies at Columbia before leaving to pursue journalism in 2007.

== Career ==
=== Early work ===
From 2007 to 2013, Dokoupil was a senior writer at Newsweek and the website The Daily Beast. In September 2013, he joined NBC News as a senior writer. He released a memoir titled The Last Pirate: A Father, His Son, and the Golden Age of Marijuana on April 1, 2014. He later became a reporter on MSNBC.

Though he originally focused on news-gathering and writing in his career, he shifted to on-screen reporting with MSNBC. On January 5, 2016, Dokoupil made one of his earliest appearances when he interviewed militia-member LaVoy Finicum live on-air during the occupation of Malheur National Wildlife Refuge in Oregon.

=== CBS Mornings ===
Following his departure from NBC News and MSNBC, Dokoupil joined CBS News as a New York-based correspondent in August 2016.

On May 6, 2019, Dokoupil was named the new co-anchor of the morning program CBS This Morning. He made his debut on May 20.

In September 2024, Dokoupil and Adriana Diaz began hosting CBS Mornings Plus, a new third hour of CBS Mornings. The move followed other broadcast networks expanding their morning shows in previous years. In October 2024, The New York Times described Dokoupil as a rising star at the network.

==== Ta-Nehisi Coates interview and statements about Israel ====
On September 30, 2024, Dokoupil discussed the Israeli-Palestinian conflict with author Ta-Nehisi Coates during the latter's appearance on CBS Mornings to promote the book The Message. Dokoupil implied that the book reads like the work of an extremist and questioned Coates about his opinion regarding Israel's right to exist. Some CBS staffers were angered by the interview, and CBS executive Adrienne Roark said that an internal review found that it did not meet network standards. Shortly after the October 7 attacks, Dokoupil had spoken about how he struggled to separate his views as a journalist from his fear for the safety of his children from his first marriage, who live in Israel with their mother.

Dokoupil was defended by Paramount chair Shari Redstone and other CBS staffers, including Jan Crawford, who argued that Dokoupil was journalistically correct to challenge Coates's argument.

The following April, Dokoupil interviewed North Carolina Tar Heels football head coach Bill Belichick and his girlfriend, Jordon Hudson, for CBS' Sunday Morning. The six-time Super Bowl–winning coach insisted that the segment was intended to promote his football memoir, The Art of Winning. However, CBS stated that it had informed Belichick that Dokoupil would discuss a wider variety of topics, including the 73-year-old’s relationship with Hudson, 24, who immediately told Belichick not to answer the question about how they met when Dokoupil asked him about it. "There were no preconditions or limitations to this conversation," the network said. Belichick felt that the final piece that aired painted Hudson as "attempting to control the conversation — which is simply not true".

=== CBS Evening News ===
In October 2025 it was reported that Bari Weiss, editor-in-chief of CBS News, was considering Dokoupil to replace John Dickerson and Maurice DuBois as anchor of CBS Evening News in order to "remake" the program and "increase the program's viewership." Other reported candidates included former Evening News anchor Norah O'Donnell, 60 Minutes correspondent and CNN anchor Anderson Cooper, and both Dana Perino and Bret Baier of Fox News.

Dokoupil became the new anchor of the program. His first day was set for January 5, 2026. Because of the United States strikes in Venezuela, his first day was Saturday, January 3, 2026.

The official CBS Evening News with Tony Dokoupil debuted as scheduled on January 5, 2026. The broadcast included stories about Venezuela, prominently including one on Nicolas Maduro's New York City trial, and spotlights on Delcy Rodriguez and Maria Corina Machado. Dokoupil's sign-off phrase on his debut was "that's another day in America."

Dokoupil's version of the Evening News restored other features from its past, including a retro anchor desk in front of an active newsroom (rather than the large LED screens previously used) and an opening theme from the time of Dan Rather's tenure as anchor.

The January 5 premiere broadcast drew 4.37 million viewers, according to Nielsen, around 9 percent above the program's Q4 average of 4.02 million, while the show's viewership on the same day a year earlier was 5.69 million; Dickerson and DuBois's debut—on January 27, 2025—had reached about 5.35 million. The debut episode still reached a smaller audience than the January 5, 2026 broadcasts of both NBC Nightly News (7.21 million viewers) and ABC World News Tonight (8.24 million viewers). By April 2026, the show was reaching an average of less than 3.9 million viewers, while it reached its lowest crowd in the 21st century among the much-coveted segment of ages 25 to 54.

==== Critical reception ====
Variety's Chief TV Critic Daniel D'Addario called Dokoupil's debut an "inauspicious" sign for the network's future news programs, arguing that he was chosen to follow Weiss's agenda, "but Dokoupil lacks the charisma and aptitude to turn the Evening News into whatever it is she may want," later comparing the anchor's performance to that of Jerry Springer. Jeff Jarvis—writing for former Evening News anchor Katie Couric's website Couric Media—wrote that it was "a nail in the coffin" for the reputation of CBS News.

Reviewers also criticized Dokoupil's Evening News for undue deference to Trump administration officials, including multiple interviews with Pete Hegseth, an embedded interview with Kristi Noem and ICE, and a "salute" to Marco Rubio as "the ultimate Florida Man." Margaret Sullivan argued that Dokoupil and CBS were representative of a Trump sycophancy in the mainstream media with its "Fox News Lite" approach.

Some conservative commentators, including Tim Graham of the Media Research Center, expressed optimism about CBS and Dokoupil's rightward shift. Others, like Sean Spicer, have rejected Dokoupil, with Spicer claiming that he was trying to gaslight conservatives into forgetting his tenure on the ostensibly liberal CBS Mornings. Megyn Kelly also criticized Dokoupil for tearing up about his early life in Miami, citing him on her podcast as a key example of the "feminization of the newsroom."

== Personal life ==
Dokoupil's first wife, Danielle Haas, filed for divorce in 2015. She later relocated with the couple's two children to Israel.

After two years of dating, Dokoupil eloped with fellow broadcast journalist Katy Tur in October 2017. They have two children together. After the birth of his fourth child, Dokoupil announced on CBS Mornings that he had undergone a vasectomy, urging other men to consider it to take on the burden of birth control from their female partners.

Dokoupil converted to Judaism in 2008 while engaged to Haas. He took classes at a progressive synagogue in Manhattan and received a second circumcision as an adult to complete his conversion, which he wrote about for The New Republic.
