= Ta-Nehisi Coates =

American writer and journalist (born 1975)

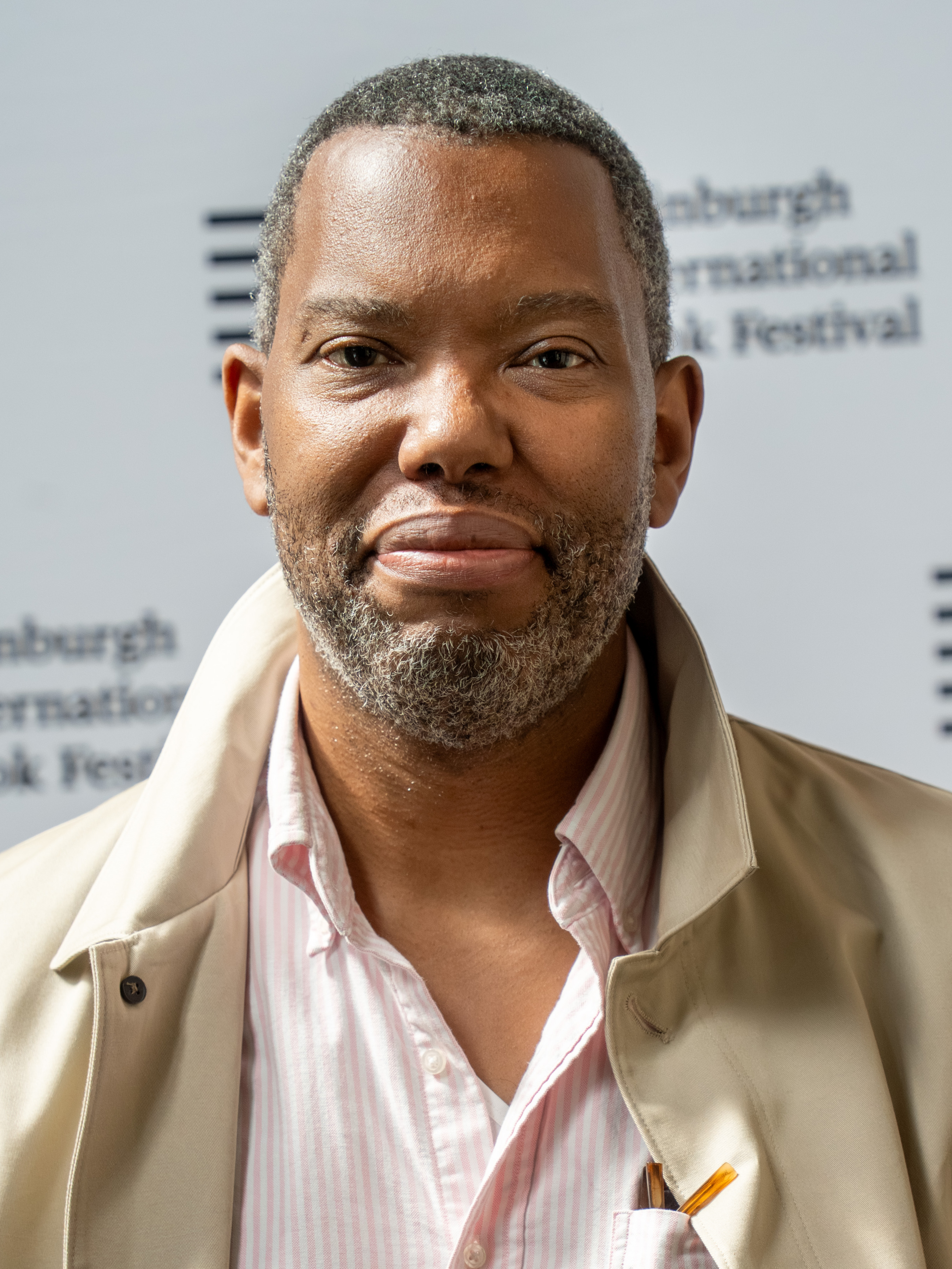
- Coates in 2025
- Born: Ta-Nehisi Paul Coates; September 30, 1975 (age 51); Baltimore, Maryland, U.S.
- Education: Howard University
- Occupations: Writer; journalist
- Notable work: "The Case for Reparations" (2014); Between the World and Me (2015); The Water Dancer (2019); The Message (2024)
- Spouse: Kenyatta Matthews
- Children: 1
- Parent(s): Cheryl Lynn Coates (née Waters); William Paul Coates
- Awards: 2014 George Polk Award for commentary; 2015 MacArthur Fellows Program; 2015 National Book Award for Nonfiction; 2015 Kirkus Prize for Nonfiction; 2018 Dayton Literary Peace Prize in Nonfiction; 2018 Eisner Award for Best Limited Series; 2018 GLAAD Media Award for Outstanding Comic Book; 2020 British Fantasy Society Sydney J. Bounds Award
- Website: ta-nehisicoates.com

Ta-Nehisi Paul Coates (/ˌtɑːnəˈhɑːsi/ TAH-nə-HAH-see; born September 30, 1975) is an American author, journalist, and activist. He gained a wide readership during his time as national correspondent at The Atlantic, where he wrote about cultural, social, and political issues, particularly regarding African Americans and white supremacy. He is politically progressive.

Coates's work has been published in numerous periodicals. He has published four nonfiction books: The Beautiful Struggle (2008), Between the World and Me (2015), We Were Eight Years in Power: An American Tragedy (2017), and The Message (2024). Between the World and Me won the 2015 National Book Award for Nonfiction. He has also written a Black Panther series and a Captain America series for Marvel Comics. His first novel, The Water Dancer, was published in 2019. In 2015, Coates received a MacArthur Fellowship.

== Early life ==
Coates was born in Baltimore, Maryland. His father, William Paul Coates (known by his middle name), was a Vietnam War veteran, former Black Panther, publisher, and librarian. His mother, Cheryl Lynn Coates (née Waters), was a teacher. Coates's first name, Ta-Nehisi, is derived from an ancient Egyptian language name for Nubia (reconstructed as nḥsj), a region along the Nile river in present-day northern Sudan and southern Egypt.

Coates's father founded and ran Black Classic Press, a publishing company specializing in African-American titles. The Press grew out of a grassroots organization, the George Jackson Prison Movement (GJPM), which initially operated a Black bookstore called the Black Book. Later, Black Classic Press was established with a tabletop printing press in the basement of the Coates family home.

Coates's father had seven children collectively, five boys and two girls, by four women: His father's first wife had three children, his mother had two boys, and the other two women each had a child. The children were raised together in a close-knit family; most lived with their mothers and at times with their father. Coates has said that he lived with his father for the entirety of his upbringing, and that, in his family, the important overarching focus was on rearing children with values based on family, respect for elders and contributing to your community—an approach to family that was common where he grew up. Coates grew up in Baltimore's Mondawmin neighborhood during the crack epidemic.

Coates's interest in literature was instilled at an early age when his mother, in response to bad behavior, would require him to write essays. His father's work with the Black Classic Press was a huge influence. Coates has said that he read many of the books his father published. Coates also enjoyed comic books and Dungeons & Dragons during his childhood.

External videos
- Panel discussion on "Crisis of the Black Male" at Howard University, featuring Coates while a Howard student, October 12, 1995, C-SPAN

Coates attended a number of Baltimore-area schools, including William H. Lemmel Middle School and the Baltimore Polytechnic Institute, before graduating from Woodlawn High School. He attended Howard University, leaving after five years to start a career in journalism. He is the only child in his family without a college degree. In mid-2014, Coates attended an intensive program in French at Middlebury College to prepare for a writing fellowship in Paris, France.

== Career ==
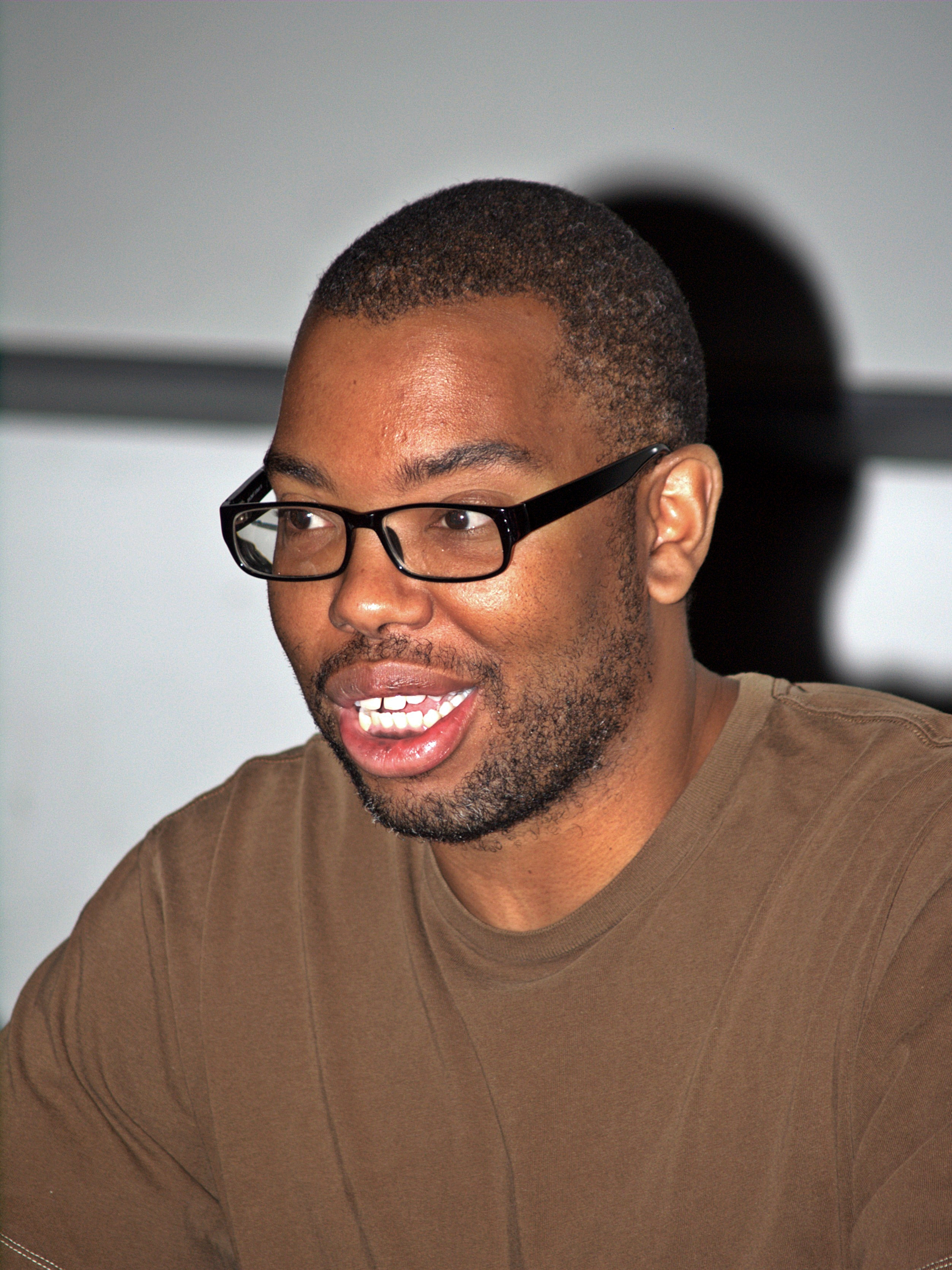
Coates at the 2010 Brooklyn Book Festival

=== Journalism ===
Coates's first journalism job was as a reporter at The Washington City Paper; his editor was David Carr. From 2000 to 2007, Coates worked as a journalist with various publications, including Philadelphia Weekly, The Village Voice, and Time. His first article for The Atlantic, "This Is How We Lost to the White Man", about Bill Cosby and conservatism, started a new, more successful, and more stable phase of his career. The article led to an appointment with a regular column for The Atlantic, a blog that was popular, influential, and had a high level of community engagement.

Coates became a senior editor at The Atlantic, for which he wrote feature articles as well as his blog. Topics covered by the blog included politics, history, race, culture, sports, and music. His writings on race, such as his September 2012 The Atlantic cover piece "Fear of a Black President" and his June 2014 feature "The Case for Reparations", have been especially praised, and won his blog a place on the Best Blogs of 2011 list by Time magazine and the 2012 Hillman Prize for Opinion & Analysis Journalism from The Sidney Hillman Foundation. His blog was praised for its engaging comments section, which Coates curated and moderated heavily so that "the jerks are invited to leave [and] the grown-ups to stay and chime in".

External videos
- Washington Journal interview with Coates on "The Case for Reparations", June 13, 2014, C-SPAN

Coates said he worked on "The Case for Reparations" for almost two years. He had read Rutgers University professor Beryl Satter's book Family Properties: Race, Real Estate, and the Exploitation of Black Urban America, a history of redlining that included a discussion of the grassroots organization the Contract Buyers League, of which Clyde Ross was a leader. The article focused not so much on reparations for slavery as on the institutional racism of housing discrimination.

Coates has worked as a guest columnist for The New York Times, having turned down an offer to become a regular columnist there. He has written for The Washington Post, the Washington Monthly, and O, The Oprah Magazine.

Coates left his position as a national correspondent for The Atlantic in 2018 after a decade with the magazine. In a memo to the staff, the editor-in-chief, Jeffrey Goldberg, said: "The last few years for him have been years of significant changes. He's told me that he would like to take some time to reflect on these changes, and to figure out the best path forward, both as a person and as a writer". In November 2025, Coates was announced as a senior staff writer for Vanity Fair.

=== Author ===
==== The Beautiful Struggle ====
In 2008, Coates published The Beautiful Struggle, a memoir about coming of age in West Baltimore and its effect on him. In the book, he discusses the influence of his father W. Paul Coates, a former Black Panther; the prevailing street crime of the era and its effects on his older brother; his own troubled experience attending Baltimore-area schools; and his eventual graduation and enrollment in Howard University. The lack of interpersonal skills and the complexity of Coates's father sheds light on a world of absentee fathers. As Rich Benjamin wrote in a 2016 article in The Guardian, "Fatherhood is a vexed topic, particularly so for an author such as Coates", and Benjamin continued by saying: "The Beautiful Struggle makes an enduring genre cliche—the father-son relationship—unexpected and new, as well as offering a vital insight into Coates's coming of age as a man and thinker."

==== Between the World and Me ====
External videos
- Presentation by Coates on Between the World and Me, October 15, 2015, C-SPAN

Coates's second book, Between the World and Me, written as a letter to his son Samori, was published in 2015. The title is drawn from a Richard Wright poem of the same name about a black man discovering the site of a lynching and becoming incapacitated with fear, creating a barrier between himself and the world. Coates said that one of the origins of the book was the death of a college friend, Prince Jones, who was shot by police in a case of mistaken identity. One of the book's themes is what physically affected African-American lives, such as their bodies being enslaved, violence that came from slavery, and various forms of institutional racism. The book won the 2015 National Book Award for Nonfiction and was a finalist for the 2016 Pulitzer Prize for General Nonfiction. It was 7th on The Guardian's list of the 100 best books of the 21st century.

==== Black Panther and Captain America ====
In 2016, Coates wrote the sixth volume of Marvel Comics' Black Panther series, which teamed him with artist Brian Stelfreeze. Issue #1 went on sale on April 6, 2016, and sold an estimated 253,259 physical copies, the best-selling comic for the month. He also wrote a spinoff of Black Panther—Black Panther and the Crew—that ran for six issues before it was canceled. In Coates's first storyline, titled A Nation Under Our Feet, T'Challa faces a popular uprising against his monarchy. At the conclusion of the story, Wakanda is reformed into a constitutional democracy, with the Black Panther continuing as a figurehead king rather than a ruler. This series introduces a new version of The Crew, now including Storm, Luke Cage, Misty Knight, and Manifold.

Critic Todd Steven Burroughs called the story "ultra-cerebral" and suggested that some of the previous authors of the character may have found it pretentious. He interprets the story as a fascinating deconstruction of Wakanda that removes "what [Coates] might call the intellectual crutch of Black nationalism" from the mythos of Black Panther.

In Coates's second storyline, Avengers of the New World, Wakanda's mythology was expanded, showing the panther goddess Bast as a member of a pantheon known as The Orisha, the term orisha, a Yoruba word for spirit or deity from Yoruba mythology, the pantheon is composed of Egyptian gods and other origins, such as Kokou, an orisha from Benin.

Coates also wrote a six-issue series called Black Panther and the Crew that addresses the problem of police killings and also suggests that the Marvel universe includes a number of previously unknown superheroes from the Bandung Conference.

In 2018, Coates announced he would be writing a ninth volume of the Captain America series, teaming him with artists Leinil Yu and Alex Ross; in that volume, he depicted the Nazi supervillain Red Skull espousing the writings of the Canadian clinical psychologist Jordan Peterson. Peterson said his work was used out of context to portray him unfavorably, calling it an attack on himself.

==== We Were Eight Years in Power ====
External videos
- Presentation by Coates on We Were Eight Years in Power, October 9, 2017, C-SPAN

Coates's collection of previously published essays on the Obama era, We Were Eight Years in Power: An American Tragedy, was announced by Random House, with a release date of October 3, 2017. Coates added essays written especially for the book bridging the gaps between the previously published essays, as well as an introduction and an epilogue. The book's title is a quote from 19th-century African-American congressman Thomas E. Miller of South Carolina, who asked why white Southerners hated African Americans after all the good they had done during the Reconstruction Era. Coates sees parallels between that period and the Obama presidency.

==== The Water Dancer ====
Coates's first novel, The Water Dancer, was published in 2019. It is a surrealist story set in the time of slavery and centers on a superhuman protagonist, Hiram Walker, who has a photographic memory but cannot remember his mother. Walker is also able to transport people long distances by "conduction", which involves folding the Earth like fabric and allows him to travel across large areas via waterways. The novel is also an Oprah's Book Club selection.

==== The Message ====
Coates's most recent nonfiction book, The Message, reflects on his visits to Dakar, Senegal; Chapin, South Carolina; and the West Bank and East Jerusalem. The latter trip left a deep impression on Coates. In a 2024 New York magazine profile, he said: "I don’t think I ever, in my life, felt the glare of racism burn stranger and more intense than in Israel." According to the profile, The Message "lays forth the case that the Israeli occupation is a moral crime, one that has been all but covered up by the West". The book is dedicated to Coates's sons, Samori and Chris.

=== Teaching ===
Coates was the 2012–2014 MLK visiting scholar for writing at the Massachusetts Institute of Technology. He joined the CUNY Graduate School of Journalism as its journalist-in-residence in late 2014. In 2017, Coates joined the faculty of New York University's Arthur L. Carter Journalism Institute as a Distinguished Writer in Residence. In 2021, he joined the Howard University faculty as writer-in-residence in the College of Arts and Sciences and holds the Sterling Brown chair in the English Department.

=== Projects ===
In 2015–16, Coates was awarded a visiting fellowship at the American Library in Paris, during which he worked on an unpublished novel about an African American from Chicago who moves to Paris.

As of 2019, Coates was working on America in the King Years, a television project with David Simon, Taylor Branch, and James McBride. The project is about Martin Luther King Jr. and the Civil Rights Movement, based on one of the volumes of the books America in the King Years by Branch, specifically At Canaan's Edge: America in the King Years, 1965–1968. The project will be produced by Oprah Winfrey and air on HBO.

Coates is set to adapt Rachel Aviv's 2014 The New Yorker article "Wrong Answer" into a full-length feature film of the same title, starring Michael B. Jordan and directed by Ryan Coogler.

In February 2021, it was reported that Coates had been hired to write the script of a new Superman feature film from DC Films and Warner Bros. Pictures, with J. J. Abrams producing, although the project was temporary paused sometime in 2022 after David Zaslav rejected a screenplay that involved the project featuring a black version of Superman fighting injustice during the Civil Rights era. The project resumed development after James Gunn agreed to co-lead DC Studios with him offering support to the project and expressed interest in reading the script, although Gunn stated that the film wouldn't be greenlit unless the screenplay was impressive. He later confirmed that it would become a DC Elseworlds film if it was produced and that it was still in development in January 2024.

=== Views on race in the United States ===
In an interview with Ezra Klein, Coates outlined his analysis that the extent of white identity expression in the United States serves as a critical factor in threat perceptions of certain European Americans and their response to political paradigm shifts related to African Americans, such as the presidency of Barack Obama.

=== Views on Israeli–Palestinian conflict ===
In an interview with Amy Goodman, Coates criticized Israel's behavior toward Palestinians in the Israeli–Palestinian conflict and the United States' support for Israel. He compared the segregation between Palestinians and Israeli settlers in the occupied Palestinian territories to Jim Crow laws in the Southern United States in the late 19th and early 20th centuries.

On September 30, 2024, CBS Mornings anchor Tony Dokoupil discussed the Israeli–Palestinian conflict with Coates during the latter's appearance on CBS Mornings to promote the book The Message. Dokoupil implied that the book "reads like the work of an extremist" and questioned Coates about Coates's view of Israel's right to exist. Some CBS staffers were angered by the interview, and CBS executive Adrienne Roark said that an internal review found that it did not meet network standards. Dokoupil was defended by Paramount chair Shari Redstone and other CBS staffers, including chief legal correspondent Jan Crawford, who said that a journalist is obliged to ask tough questions when interviewing someone presenting a one-sided view.

== Personal life ==
In 2009, Coates lived in Harlem with his wife, Kenyatta Matthews, and son, Samori Maceo-Paul Coates. His son's name is a reference to three people: Samori Ture, a Mandé chief who fought French colonialism, black Cuban revolutionary Antonio Maceo Grajales, and Coates's father, who was known by his middle name, Paul. Coates met his wife when they were both students at Howard University. He is an atheist and a feminist. With his family, Coates moved to Prospect Lefferts Gardens, Brooklyn, New York, in 2001. The family purchased a brownstone in Prospect Lefferts Gardens in 2016, although they did not move into the brownstone due to media attention that accompanied the purchase. In 2016, Coates was made a member of Phi Beta Kappa at Oregon State University.

== Awards ==
- 2012: Hillman Prize for Opinion and Analysis Journalism
- 2013: National Magazine Award for Essays and Criticism for "Fear of a Black President"
- 2014: George Polk Award for Commentary for "The Case for Reparations"
- 2015: Harriet Beecher Stowe Center Prize for Writing to Advance Social Justice for "The Case for Reparations"
- 2015: American Library in Paris Visiting Fellowship
- 2015: National Book Award for Nonfiction for Between the World and Me
- 2015: Fellow of the John D. and Catherine T. MacArthur Foundation
- 2015: Kirkus Prize for Nonfiction for Between the World and Me
- 2018: Dayton Literary Peace Prize in Nonfiction for We Were Eight Years in Power
- 2018: Eisner Award for Best Limited Series, for Black Panther: World of Wakanda (with Roxane Gay and Alitha E. Martinez)
- 2020: British Fantasy Society Sydney J. Bounds Award for The Water Dancer

== Bibliography ==
=== Novel ===
- —— (2019). The Water Dancer. New York: One World. ISBN 9780399590597.

=== Short fiction ===
- —— (June 3, 2019). "Conduction". The New Yorker.

=== Monographs ===
- —— (1990). Asphalt Sketches. Baltimore: Sundiata Publications.
- —— (2008). The Beautiful Struggle: A Father, Two Sons, and an Unlikely Road to Manhood. New York: Spiegel & Grau. ISBN 9780385526845.
- —— (2015). Between the World and Me: Notes on the First 150 Years in America. New York: Spiegel & Grau. ISBN 9780812993547.
- —— (2017). We Were Eight Years in Power: An American Tragedy. New York: One World. ISBN 9780399590566.
- —— (2024). The Message. New York: One World. ISBN 9780593230381.

=== Selected articles ===
- —— (January 2006). "Promises of an Unwed Father". O: the Oprah Magazine. Archived from the original on April 19, 2023.
- —— (January–February 2009). "American Girl". The Atlantic.
- —— (2010). "A Deeper Black". In Early, Gerald Lyn; Kennedy, Randall (eds.). Best African American Essays 2010. New York: One World. pp. 15–22. ISBN 9780553806922.
- —— (February 2012). "Why Do So Few Blacks Study the Civil War?". The Atlantic (The Civil War Issue).
- —— (2013). "Fear of a Black President". In Bennet, James (ed.). The Best American Magazine Writing 2013. New York: Columbia University Press. pp. 3–32. ISBN 9780231537063.
- —— (June 2013). "How Learning a Foreign Language Reignited My Imagination: Pardon my French". The Atlantic. 311 (5): 44–45.
- —— (June 2014). "The Case for Reparations". The Atlantic.
- —— (July–August 2015). "There Is No Post-Racial America". The Atlantic.
- —— (October 2015). "The Black Family in the Age of Mass Incarceration". The Atlantic.
- —— (December 2016). "My President Was Black". The Atlantic.
- —— (October 2017). "The First White President". The Atlantic.
- —— (May 2018). "I'm Not Black, I'm Kanye". The Atlantic.

=== Comics ===
- Black Panther vol. 6 #1–18, #166–172 (2016–2018)
  - A Nation Under Our Feet Book 1 (TPB, 144 pages, 2016, ISBN 9781302900533)
  - A Nation Under Our Feet Book 2 (TPB, 144 pages, 2017, ISBN 9781302900540)
  - A Nation Under Our Feet Book 3 (TPB, 144 pages, 2017, ISBN 9781302901912)
  - Avengers of the New World Book 1 (TPB, 144 pages, 2017, ISBN 9781302906498)
  - Avengers of the New World Book 2 (TPB, 136 pages, 2018, ISBN 9781302909888)
- Black Panther vol. 7, #1–25 (2018–2021)
  - Intergalactic Empire of Wakanda Part 1 (TPB, 136 pages, 2019, ISBN 9781302912932)
  - Intergalactic Empire of Wakanda Part 2 (TPB, 136 pages, 2019, ISBN 9781302912949)
  - Intergalactic Empire of Wakanda Part 3 (TPB, 136 pages, 2020, ISBN 9781302914462)
  - Intergalactic Empire of Wakanda Part 4 (TPB, 176 pages, 2021, ISBN 9781302921101)
- Black Panther: World of Wakanda #1–6 (2016) (with Roxane Gay, Yona Harvey)
  - Vol. 1: Dawn of the Midnight Angels (TPB, 144 pages, 2017, ISBN 9781302906504)
- Black Panther and the Crew #1–6 (2017) (with Yona Harvey)
  - Vol. 1: We Are the Streets (TPB, 136 pages, 2017, ISBN 9781302908324)
- Captain America vol. 9, #1–30 (2018–2021)
  - Winter in America (TPB, 152 pages, 2019, ISBN 9781302911942)
  - Captain of Nothing (TPB, 144 pages, 2019, ISBN 9781302911959)
  - The Legend of Steve (TPB, 152 pages, 2020, ISBN 9781302914417)
  - All Die Young (TPB, 144 pages, 2021, ISBN 9781302920401)
- Free Comic Book Day Vol 2018 Avengers

=== Multimedia ===
- with Richard Harrington, Nelson George, and Kojo Nnamdi. Hip Hop. Washington, D.C.: WAMU, American University, 1999. OCLC 426123467 Audio conversation recorded January 29, 1999, at WAMU-FM, Washington, D.C.
- with Stephen Colbert. "Ta-Nehisi Coates". The Colbert Report. June 16, 2014.
- with Ezra Klein. Vox Conversations: "Should America offer reparations for slavery?", Vox. July 18, 2014.
- The Case for Reparations. Middlebury, Vt.: Middlebury College, 2015. OCLC 904962550. Video of lecture delivered at Middlebury College on March 4, 2015.
- with Amy Goodman. "Between the World and Me: Ta-Nehisi Coates Extended Interview on Being Black in America". Democracy Now!. July 22, 2015.
- with Jon Stewart. "Exclusive – Ta-Nehisi Coates Extended Interview", "Pt. 1" and "Pt. 2". The Daily Show with Jon Stewart. July 23, 2015.
- with Amy Goodman. Ta-Nehisi Coates: "Joe Biden Shouldn’t Be President". Democracy Now!. June 20, 2019.
- with Sean Illing. The Gray Area: "Ta-Nehisi Coates on complexity, clarity, and truth | What the author saw in Palestine", Vox, October 15, 2024.
