= John Clark Mayden =

American photographer, author, and attorney

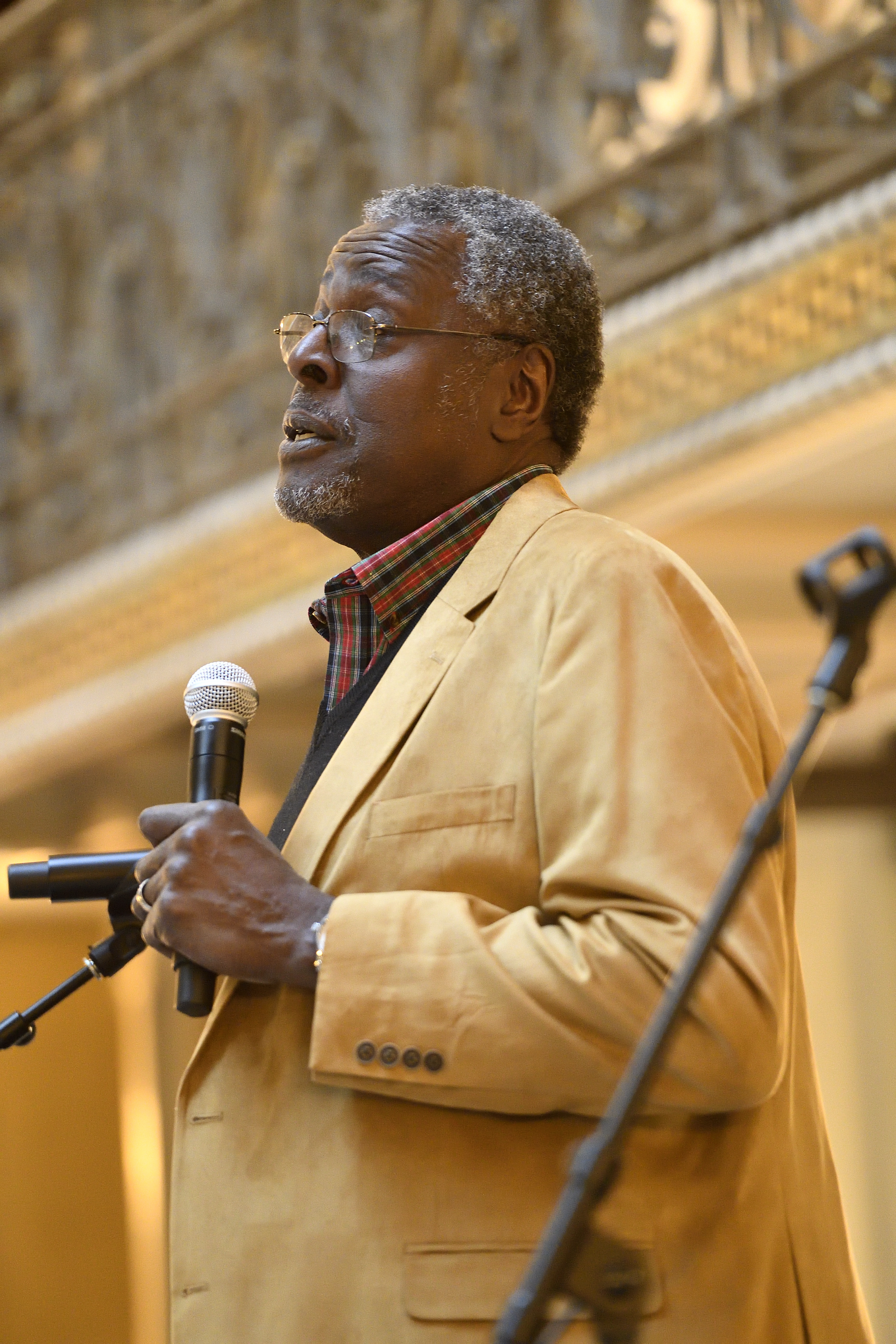
- Mayden speaking at Johns Hopkins University, 2020
- Born: May 16, 1951 (age 75); Baltimore, Maryland, U.S.
- Education: B.A., Ohio Wesleyan University; J.D., University of Baltimore School of Law
- Occupations: photographer, writer, attorney
- Spouse: Bronwyn W. Mayden (1975–present)
- Writing career
- Notable work: Baltimore Lives: The Portraits of John Clark Mayden

John Clark Mayden (born May 16, 1951) is an American photographer, author, and attorney. In 2019, he authored Baltimore Lives: The Portraits of John Clark Mayden, his collected photographic works of African-Americans in Baltimore street scenes between 1970 and 2012.

== Early years ==
Mayden was born in 1951 and grew up in Baltimore's Druid Hill Park neighborhood, where he enjoyed swimming as a youth at the local YMCA, eventually becoming a lifeguard there. He graduated from Baltimore's old Northwestern High School, where he was the first black president of the student government at a time when the school was predominantly white. Mayden was also captain of Northwestern's football team in his senior year, as well as competing on the track team.

Mayden was impressed as a youngster by the Life magazine photography of Gordon Parks. While still a teenager, Mayden interned at WMAR-TV, where he became interested in photography as an assistant accompanying the Baltimore television station's staff photographer covering various news assignments. He then progressed to learning photographic processing in the newsroom's darkroom.

Mayden graduated from Ohio Wesleyan University in 1974 with a Bachelor of Arts degree in political science and a minor in fine arts. While at Ohio Wesleyan, he was admitted to the university's chapter of Pi Sigma Alpha, the political science honor society. In 1978, Mayden obtained a Juris Doctor degree at the University of Baltimore School of Law. Mayden then worked as an attorney in the office of the Baltimore City Solicitor for 34 years before his retirement. He also led the successful effort to reopen the closed YMCA where he swam and played basketball as a teenager. In the early 1980s, Mayden was president of that Y's board of directors.

== Photography ==
As an African-American, Mayden's photographs of black life have been exhibited nationwide and portray people he has encountered in various street scenes of Baltimore and some of its gritty neighborhoods. His photographs were extolled by James Baldwin for capturing the "majesty of black life" in portraying people who are "weary but not cast down". Mayden's works have been exhibited at the Corcoran Gallery of Art and the University of Pennsylvania's Sharp Gallery, as well as the Baltimore Museum of Art, Walters Art Museum, and most recently Johns Hopkins University's George Peabody Library. Mayden was an artist-in-residence at the Light Work program of Syracuse University in 2008. For the 2019 exhibition of his works at the George Peabody Library, City People: Black Baltimore in the Photographs of John Clark Mayden, the curators said, "Mayden lays bare the beauty and heartbreak of everyday life, Black life, in an American city."

Baltimore Lives: The Portraits of John Clark Mayden cover photograph (Johns Hopkins University Press, 2019)

In 2019, Mayden authored Baltimore Lives: The Portraits of John Clark Mayden, his collected photographic works of African-Americans in Baltimore street scenes between 1970 and 2012. The book of 101 photographs chronicles "the everyday beauty and pain of Black life in Baltimore", he writes. It won the Foreword Magazine Book of the Year Bronze Award in 2019 in the category Photography (Adult Nonfiction). The judges making the award praised both the technical excellence of Mayden's photography, citing its "gorgeous velvety tones and textures" and "composition, lighting, and darkroom technique", and the subject matter of people "burdened by problems, but whose everyday lives resonate with intensity".

Mayden told a reporter that he recalls taking the photo used on the book's cover (pictured) in 1977. The unknown woman was waiting at a neighborhood bus stop. After she made eye contact, he snapped her picture, anticipating it would make a beguiling portrait.

Mayden's photographs appear in the HBO film adaptation of Between the World and Me, which is based on Ta-Nehisi Coates' account of his struggles as a black youth in Baltimore. The Baltimore Sun called the photographs "powerful images".

Mayden's work was included in the 2025 exhibition Photography and the Black Arts Movement, 1955–1985 at the National Gallery of Art.

== Personal life ==
Mayden married Bronwyn W. Mayden on April 5, 1975, and they have two sons. As of 2020, the couple lives in the west Baltimore neighborhood of Hunting Ridge, a city-designated Historic District, where he maintains a photography studio and darkroom having more than 30,000 negatives.
