= Northwestern High School (Baltimore) =

Location
- 6900 Park Heights Avenue; Baltimore, Maryland 21215; United States; 39°21′52″N 76°42′14″W

Information
- School type: Defunct public high school
- Founded: 1965
- Closed: 2017
- School district: Baltimore City Public Schools
- School number: 401
- Grades: 9-12
- Area: Urban
- Colors: Blue and White
- Team name: Wildcats
- Website: www.baltimorecityschools.org/401 at the Wayback Machine (archive index)

Northwestern High School was a public high school located in Baltimore, Maryland, from 1965 to 2017. When it was built in 1965, it was racially integrated. The school's track and field teams from the 1970s and 1980s were some of the state's best, winning multiple MSA A Conference Championships.

When plans were announced in 2016 to close the school, alumni and community leaders mounted an ultimately unsuccessful campaign to keep it open. Northwestern High School closed at the end of the 2016–2017 school year, having been merged with Forest Park High School as part of the Baltimore City Public Schools's "21st Century Schools Building Plan" to consolidate and modernize schools in the district in response to declining enrollments. Student records are obtainable through BCPS headquarters.

== Notable alumni ==
- Frank M. Conaway, Jr., member of the Maryland House of Delegates
- Keandre Cook (born 1997), basketball player for Hapoel Tel Aviv of the Israeli Basketball Premier League
- Sheila Dixon (born 1953), mayor of Baltimore
- Mark A. R. Kleiman (1951–2019) , criminal justice professor, author, and blogger
- John Clark Mayden, photographer
- Ray Snell, NFL player
- Sean Vanhorse, NFL player
- Terrance West, NFL player
