= Killing of Prince Jones =

2000 police killing in Prince George's County, Virginia, United States

- Undated photo of Jones
- Date: September 1, 2000
- Location: Fairfax County, Virginia, U.S.
- Type: Police shooting
- Participants: Jones and police officer Carlton Jones
- Deaths: Prince Jones, 25

Prince Carmen "Rocky" Jones Jr. (1975 – September 1, 2000) was an African-American man killed by a police officer in September 2000 in Virginia. Author Ta-Nehisi Coates attended Jones' memorial service, and later wrote at length about Jones' life and death in his 2015 book Between the World and Me, noting that the tragedies of racism are impossible to escape for Black people, even those well-off.

== Biography ==
Jones was the son of Prince C. Jones Sr. and Dr. Mabel Jones, a physician and the daughter of a sharecropper. He attended the Texas Academy of Mathematics and Science in Denton, Texas, Howard University in Washington, D.C., was a personal trainer at a Washington metropolitan area gym, and was set to enlist in the U.S. Navy. He had an infant daughter with his fiancée Candace Carson. He was described as upstanding, religious, and a health food fanatic.

== Killing by police ==
On September 1, 2000, Jones was unarmed and driving his Jeep Cherokee to meet his fiancée. Undercover black police officer Carlton Jones (no relation) of Prince George's County, Maryland, followed Jones for 15 miles in an unmarked vehicle into Fairfax County, Virginia. Officer Jones displayed his gun and announced he was police, though he was not in uniform and did not display his badge. According to the officer, Prince Jones rammed the police vehicle with his Jeep, leading the officer to shoot at Jones' Jeep 16 times, striking him six times, including five times in the back. Two witnesses in the 2006 civil trial contradicted the officer's account; one testified that Jones' vehicle was not moving when the shots were fired.

Carlton Jones later explained the killing as a case of mistaken identity, and in October 2000 the county prosecutor, Fairfax County Commonwealth's Attorney Robert F. Horan Jr., declined to file criminal charges against Officer Jones. This decision aggrieved Prince Jones' family, friends, and local civil rights leaders, who noted Prince George County's documented history of police brutality and decried the continued failure of the criminal justice system to hold police accountable for serious misconduct. The county prosecutor's inaction was tantamount to "legitimizing murder", they said. The Prince George's Fraternal Order of Police lauded the prosecutor's decision, and of Officer Jones said "it's clear that he was defending himself."

A memorial service for Jones was held at Howard University. Jones, Ta-Nehisi Coates, and Carlton Jones had all spent their undergraduate years at Howard, although none of the men ultimately graduated from the university.

In January 2006, a Prince George County Circuit Court civil jury determined that Prince Jones's death at the hands of the Prince George County police was wrongful and awarded $3.7 million in damages to Prince Jones' family. Amounts to be paid to the parents were thrown out by the judge, and the parties reached a settlement of $2.5 million that was accepted as the final arrangement.

== See also ==
- List of unarmed African Americans killed by law enforcement officers in the United States
