= Katy Tur =

American author and journalist (born 1983)

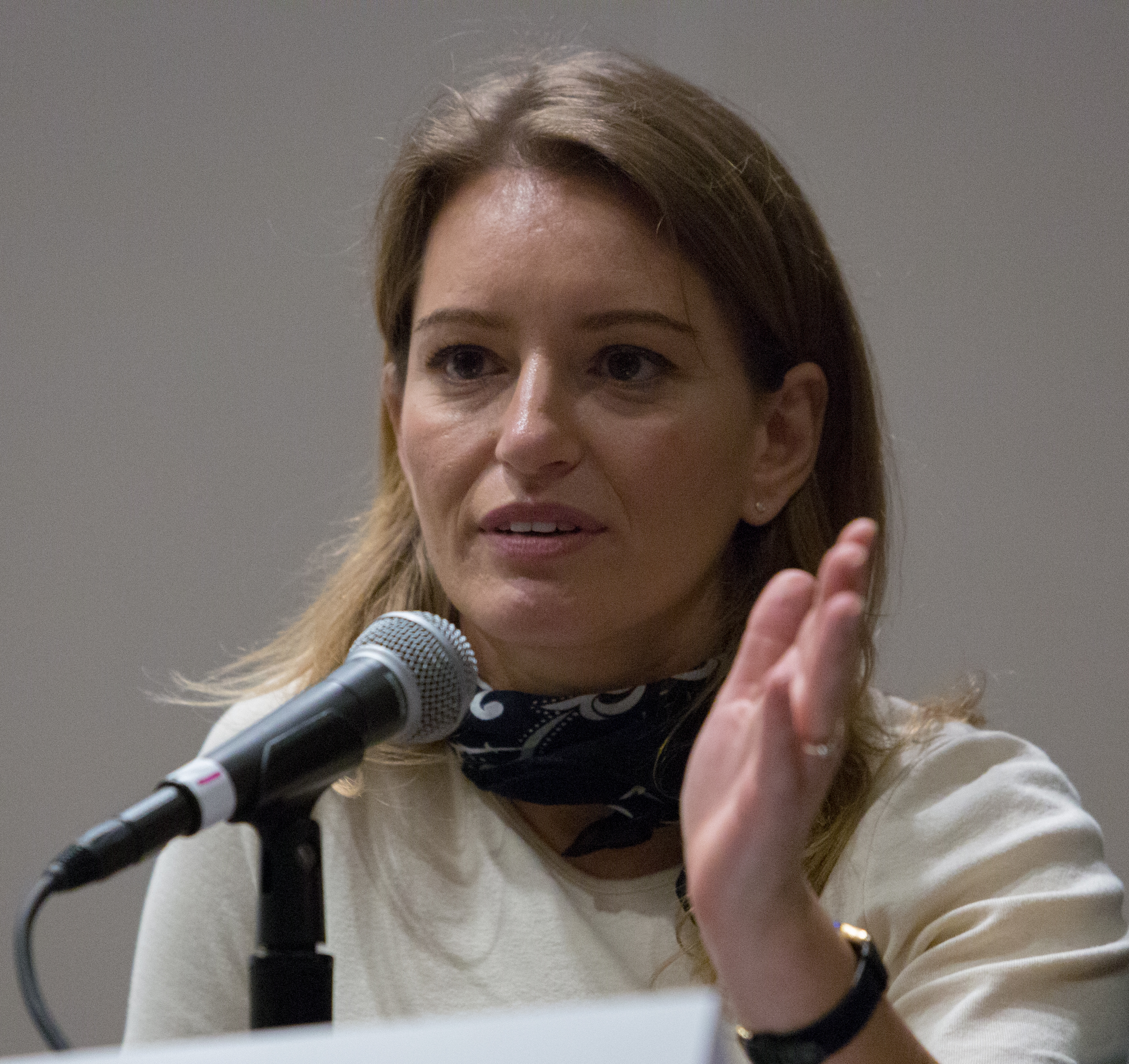
- Tur in 2017
- Born: Katherine Bear Tur; October 26, 1983 (age 43); Los Angeles, California, U.S.
- Education: University of California, Santa Barbara (BA)
- Occupations: Journalist, news anchor
- Years active: 2005–present
- Employer: Versant
- Spouse: Tony Dokoupil (m. 2017)
- Children: 2
- Parent(s): Marika Gerrard; Zoey Tur

Katherine Bear Tur-Dokoupil (/ˈtɜːr/; born October 26, 1983) is an American author and broadcast journalist working as a correspondent and host of "The Moment" for MS NOW. She has anchored daytime news coverage for the network since 2017; her show had been named Katy Tur Reports since 2021, but in June 2026 became The Moment with Katy Tur. She has also reported for the NBC news platforms Early Today, Today, NBC Nightly News, Meet the Press, and WNBC-TV, and for The Weather Channel.

== Early life ==
Tur is the daughter of journalists Zoey Tur and Marika Gerrard. She graduated from Brentwood School (2001), and from the University of California, Santa Barbara (2005), with a Bachelor of Arts in philosophy. She is of Jewish descent.

== Career ==
Tur reported for KTLA, HD News/Cablevision, News 12 Brooklyn, WPIX-TV, and Fox 5 New York. Later on, Tur worked as a storm chaser for The Weather Channel on the network's VORTEX2 team.

=== NBC News and MSNBC ===
In 2009, Tur joined NBC's local station in New York, WNBC-TV, and then rose to the flagship NBC News at the national network level. That year she was awarded AP's Best Spot News Award for coverage of the March 2008 crane collapse on the Upper East Side of Manhattan. While at NBC News, she covered the death of Cory Monteith, a motorcycle attack on an SUV, and the search for Malaysia Airlines Flight 370.

=== Trump campaign correspondent ===
Tur was NBC News's and MSNBC's embedded reporter on the 2016 Donald Trump presidential campaign. As a reporter for NBC, Tur was assigned the task of informing the Trump campaign about the Access Hollywood tape that the network had in its possession, featuring Trump's remarks about women in a conversation with Billy Bush.

On several occasions during his campaign rallies, Trump singled out Tur in his criticism of the press. At an event in Florida, Tur was booed by Trump supporters and, according to CNN anchor Wolf Blitzer, verbally harassed. According to Trump campaign manager Kellyanne Conway, "(Trump) didn't mean it in any malicious way", and he did not want anyone to attack or harass her.

In 2017, Tur received the Walter Cronkite Award for Excellence in Journalism.

Tur reflected on covering the Trump campaign and his treatment of her at campaign rallies in an article for Marie Claire. In September 2017, she published a book, Unbelievable: My Front-Row Seat to the Craziest Campaign in American History, recounting her experience in covering Trump's 2016 presidential campaign. The book spent several weeks on the New York Times Best Seller list.

== Personal life ==
From 2006 to 2009, Tur was in a relationship with then MSNBC political commentator and sportscaster Keith Olbermann, who openly claims to have edited and written many of her news reports, advising many of her career choices, paying off her student loans, and paying for her housing for a year after they separated.

Tur married Tony Dokoupil, anchor for CBS Evening News, on October 27, 2017, in Utah. Together they have a son, born in April 2019, and a daughter, born in May 2021. She also has two stepchildren from Dokoupil's first marriage.

She is fluent in Spanish.

Tur had a falling out with her parent, news reporter Zoey Tur, and the two did not speak for several years. In her 2022 book, Rough Draft: A Memoir, Tur details her parents' achievements, as well as her relationship with them while being raised as the daughter of "parents as broadcast pioneers who often put themselves in harm's way".

== Bibliography ==
- Unbelievable: My Front Row Seat to the Craziest Campaign in American History (Dey Street, 2017)
- Rough Draft: A Memoir (Atria/One Signal Publishers, 2022)

== See also ==
- New Yorkers in journalism
