= Beryl Satter =

American historian (born 1959)

- Born: January 14, 1959 (age 67)
- Education: Yale University

Beryl Satter (born January 14, 1959) is an American historian and a professor of history at Rutgers University.

== Life ==
Satter was born on January 14, 1959, as the daughter of civil rights lawyer Mark J. Satter, who fought for black families suffering under the ruthless and oftentimes racist conditions that pervaded Chicago's real estate market. In 1965, her father died of heart failure when she was just six years old.

== Career ==
Satter graduated from Yale University in 1992. She is currently a professor of history at Rutgers University.

The books she has authored focus mostly on the history of the city of Chicago. In particular, they have examined the history of race relations in Chicago, including their connection with the local real estate market, which at times was among the most segregated in the nation. Her work served as the basis for Ta-Nehisi Coates's award-winning 2014 article "The Case for Reparations".

== Distinctions ==
Satter became a Guggenheim Fellow in 2015.

== Bibliography ==
Some of her books are:

- Family Properties: Race, Real Estate, and the Exploitation of Black Urban America
- Each Mind a Kingdom: American Women, Sexual Purity, and the New Thought Movement, 1875-1920

== Awards ==
- 2009: National Jewish Book Award in the History category for Family Properties: Race, Real Estate, and the Exploitation of Black Urban America
