= Between the World and Me =

2015 book by Ta-Nehisi Coates

- Author: Ta-Nehisi Coates
- Language: English
- Subject: Autobiography, American history, race relations
- Published: July 2015
- Publisher: Spiegel & Grau
- Publication place: United States
- Media type: Print
- Pages: 176
- ISBN: 978-0-8129-9354-7

Between the World and Me is a 2015 non-fiction book written by American author Ta-Nehisi Coates and published by Spiegel & Grau. It was written by Coates as a letter to his then-teenage son about his perception of what the feelings, symbolism, and realities associated with being Black in the United States are. Coates recapitulates American history and explains to his son "racist violence that has been woven into American culture." Coates draws from an abridged, autobiographical account of his youth in Baltimore, detailing his beliefs about the ways in which, to him, institutions like schools, the local police, and even "the streets" discipline, endanger, and threaten to "disembody" black men and women.

The work takes structural and thematic inspiration from James Baldwin's 1963 epistolary book The Fire Next Time. Unlike Baldwin, however, Coates views white supremacy as "an indestructible force, one that Black Americans will never evade or erase, but will always struggle against."

Nobel laureate Toni Morrison praised the book, in that Coates "filled an intellectual gap in succession to James Baldwin." Editors of The New York Times and The New Yorker described the book as "exceptional". The book won the 2015 National Book Award for Nonfiction and was a finalist for the 2016 Pulitzer Prize for General Nonfiction.

== Publication ==
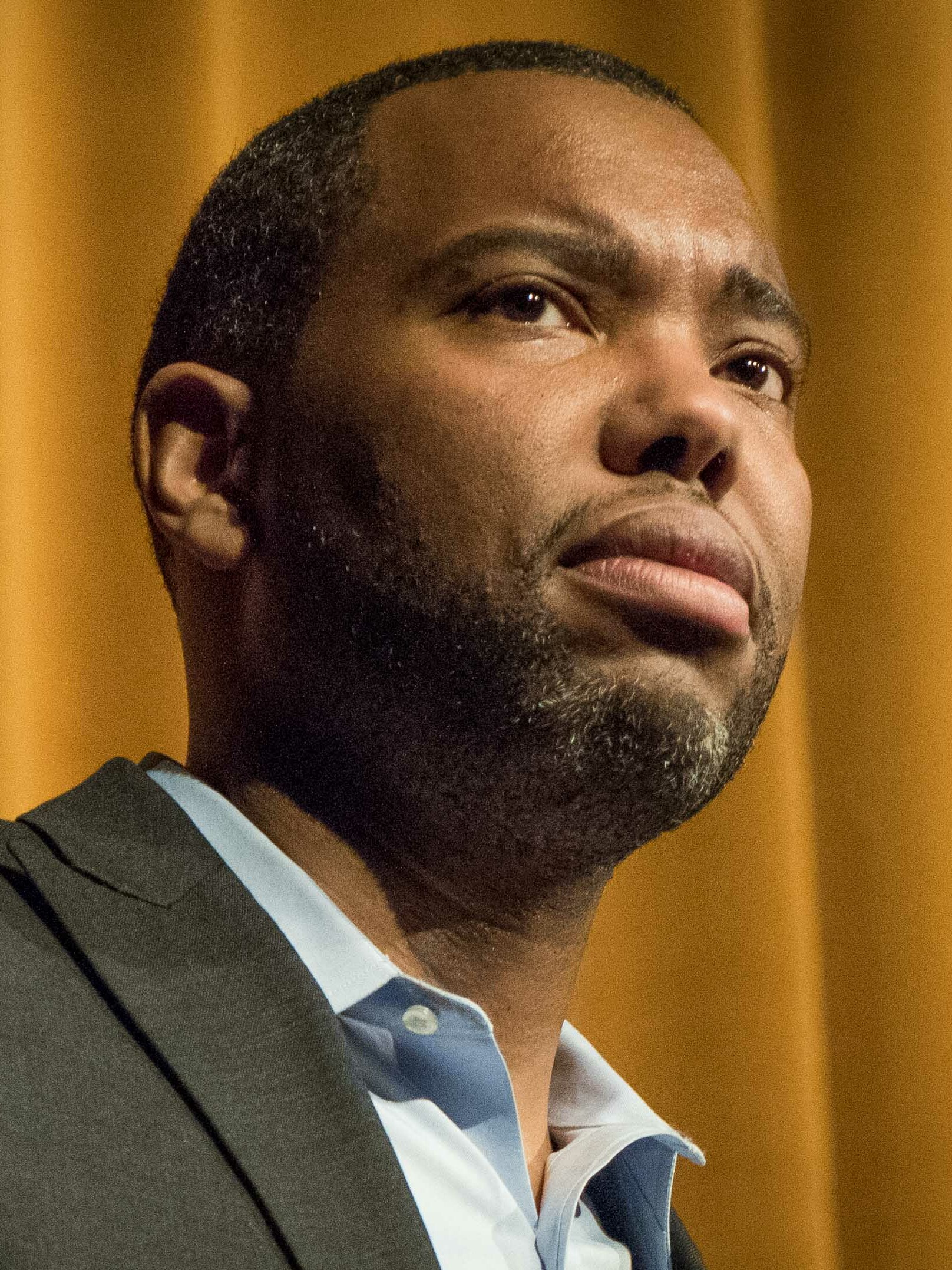
Coates, 2015

Coates was inspired to write Between the World and Me following a 2013 meeting with sitting United States President Barack Obama. Coates, a writer for The Atlantic, had been reading James Baldwin's 1963 The Fire Next Time and was determined to make his second meeting with the president less deferential than his first. As he left for Washington, D.C., his wife encouraged him to think like Baldwin, and Coates recalled an unofficial, fiery meeting between Baldwin, Black activists, and Robert F. Kennedy in 1963. When it was his turn, Coates debated with Obama whether his policy sufficiently addressed racial disparities in the universal health care rollout. After the event, Obama and Coates spoke privately about a blog post Coates had written criticizing the president's call for more personal responsibility among African Americans. Obama disagreed with the criticism and told Coates not to despair.

As Coates walked to the train station, he thought about how Baldwin would not have shared Obama's optimism, the same optimism that supported many Civil Rights Movement activists' belief that justice was inevitable. Instead, Coates saw Baldwin as being fundamentally "cold", without "sentiment and melodrama" in his acknowledgment that the movement could fail and that requital was not guaranteed. Coates found this idea "freeing" and called his book editor, Christopher Jackson, to ask "why no one wrote like Baldwin anymore." Jackson proposed that Coates try.

Between the World and Me is Coates's second book, following his 2008 memoir The Beautiful Struggle. Since then, and especially in the 18 months including the Ferguson unrest preceding his new book's release, Coates somberly believed less in the soul and its aspirational sense of eventual justice. Coates felt that he had become more radicalized.

== Title ==
The book's title comes from Richard Wright's poem "Between the World and Me", originally published in the July/August 1935 issue of Partisan Review. Wright's poem is about a Black man discovering the site of a lynching and becoming incapacitated with fear, creating a barrier between himself and the world. Despite Between the World and Me undergoing many changes as the book was revised, Coates always planned to end with the story of Mabel Jones. The only endorsement Coates sought was that of novelist Toni Morrison, which he received. Between the World and Me was published by Spiegel & Grau in 2015.

The phrase "between the world and me" is literally in the text of Baldwin's The Fire Next Time.

== Summary ==
"You must always remember," Coates writes to Samori, "that the sociology, the history, the economics, the graphs, the charts, the regressions all land, with great violence, upon the body."

— From Between the World and Me as excerpted in New York magazine

Between the World and Me takes the form of a book-length letter from the author to his son, adopting the structure of Baldwin's The Fire Next Time; the latter is directed, in part, towards Baldwin's nephew, while the former addresses Coates's 15-year-old son. Coates's letter is divided into three parts, recounting Coates's experiences as a young man, after the birth of his son, and during a visit with Mabel Jones. Coates contemplates the feelings, symbolism, and realities associated with being Black in the United States. He recapitulates the American history of violence against Black people and the incommensurate policing of Black youth. The book's tone is poetic and bleak, guided by his experiences growing up poor and always at risk of bodily harm. He prioritizes the physical security of African-American bodies over the tradition in Black Christianity of optimism, "uplift", and faith in eventual justice (i.e., being on God's side). As Coates discussed in a 2015 interview at the Chicago Humanities Festival, he was inspired by his college professor Eileen Boris who utilized an extended metaphor of the physical body for exploitation by objectification in her course, “History of Women in America" at Howard University. Her teachings inspired Coates's theme of the physical and visceral experience of racism on the body. His background, which he describes as "physicality and chaos", leads him to emphasize the daily corporeal concerns he experiences as an African-American in U.S. culture. Coates's position is that absent the religious rhetoric of "hope and dreams and faith and progress", only systems of White supremacy remain along with no real evidence that those systems are bound to change. In this way, he disagrees with Martin Luther King, Jr.'s optimism about integration and Malcolm X's optimism about nationalism.

Coates gives an abridged, autobiographical account of his youth "always on guard" in Baltimore and his fear of the physical harm threatened by both the police and the streets. He also feared the rules of code-switching to meet the clashing social norms of the streets, the authorities, and the professional world. He contrasts these experiences with neat suburban life, which he calls "the Dream" because it is an exclusionary fantasy for White people who are enabled by, yet largely ignorant of, their history of privilege and suppression. To become conscious of their gains from slavery, segregation, and voter suppression would shatter that Dream. The book ends with a story about Mabel Jones, the daughter of a sharecropper, who worked and rose in social class to give her children comfortable lives, including private schools and European trips. Her son, Coates's college friend Prince Jones, was mistakenly tracked and killed by a policeman. Coates uses his friend's story to argue that racism and related tragedy affects Black people of means as well.

== Reception ==
After reading Between the World and Me, novelist Toni Morrison wrote that Coates fills "the intellectual void" left by James Baldwin's death 28 years prior. A. O. Scott of The New York Times said the book is "essential, like water or air". David Remnick of The New Yorker described it as "extraordinary".

In Politico, Rich Lowry, editor of the conservative National Review, cited Coates' "monstrous" passage about Black people who died in 9/11. Most people, wrote Lowry, would not think, as Coates did, "They were not human to me. Black, white, or whatever, they were menaces of nature; they were the fire, the comet, the storm, which could — with no justification — shatter my body."

Michiko Kakutani of The New York Times wrote that the phrasing of his comments on 9/11 could be easily misread. Between the World and Me functioned as a sequel to Coates's 2008 memoir, which displayed Coates's talents as an emotional and lyrical writer. Coates's use of "the Dream" (in reference to paradisal suburban life) confused her, and she thought Coates stretched beyond what is safely generalizable. Kakutani thought that Coates did not consistently acknowledge racial progress achieved over the course of centuries and that some parts read like the author's internal debate. Benjamin Wallace-Wells of New York magazine said that a sense of fear for one's children propels the book, and Coates's atheism gives the book a sense of urgency.

On November 18, 2015, it was announced that Coates had won the National Book Award for Between the World and Me. NPR's Colin Dwyer had considered it the favorite to win the prize, given the book's reception. It also won the 2015 Kirkus Prize for nonfiction.

The book topped The New York Times Best Seller list for nonfiction on August 2, 2015, and remained number 1 for three weeks. It topped the same list again during the week of January 24, 2016.

The book was selected by Washington University in St. Louis and Augustana College in 2016, as the book for all first-year students to read and discuss in the fall 2016 semester. In the same year, the book was ranked 7th on The Guardian's list of the 100 best books of the 21st century.

In September 2020, Mercer County public schools pulled the book from class.

In February 2023, an AP English teacher in South Carolina's Lexington & Richland County School District Five was forced to halt a lesson on the book by school administrators, who claimed that the lesson violated state budget provisions. South Carolina law prohibits the use of state funds for lessons that teach that "an individual should feel discomfort, guilt, anguish or any other form of psychological distress on account of his race or sex" or "an individual, by virtue of his race or sex, is inherently racist, sexist, or oppressive, whether consciously or unconsciously." Coates attended the school board meeting about the incident. He wrote about it in his book, The Message.

== Editions and translations ==
- Hardcover, English. Spiegel & Grau; 1st edition (July 14, 2015), ISBN 978-0812993547
- E-book, English. Spiegel & Grau; 1st edition (July 14, 2015), ASIN: B00SEFAIRI
- Hardcover, French. "Une colère noire : Lettre à mon fils". AUTREMENT (January 27, 2016), ISBN 978-2746743410
- E-book, French. "Une colère noire : Lettre à mon fils". AUTREMENT (January 27, 2016) ASIN: B01A91OE0G
- Hardcover, German. Miriam Mandelkow (translator), "Zwischen mir und der Welt". Hanser Berlin (February 1, 2016), ISBN 978-3446251076
- E-book, German. Miriam Mandelkow (translator), "Zwischen mir und der Welt". Hanser Berlin (February 1, 2016) ASIN: B018VATBL4
- Paperback, Spanish. Javier Calvo Perales (translator), "Entre el mundo y yo" (nd), ISBN 978-8432229657
- E-book, Spanish. Javier Calvo Perales (translator), "Entre el mundo y yo." Seix Barral (October 18, 2016) ASIN: B01IPXTMS4
- Paperback, Catalan. Josefina Caball Guerrero (translator). "Entre el món i jo" (nd), ISBN 978-8416367719
- E-book, Catalan. Josefina Caball Guerrero (translator). "Entre el món i jo" (October 19, 2016), ASIN: B01JB6TWY8
- Hardcover, Norwegian. Bodil Engen (Translator). "Mellom verden og meg", Heinesen forl. (2016), ISBN 9788281770430
- Hardcover, Korean. 오은숙 (translator). "세상과 나 사이". 열린책들 (September 5, 2016), ISBN 9788932917788, 8932917787
- Hardcover, Polish. Dariusz Żukowski (translator). "Między światem a mną". Agora S.A. (May 26, 2021), ISBN 9788326845796, 8326845795
- Hardcover, Dutch. Rutger H. Cornets de Groot (translator), "Tussen de wereld en mij", Amsterdam University Press (November 1, 2015), ISBN 9789462981546
- Paperback, Portuguese. Paulo Geiger (translator), "Entre o Mundo e Eu". Objetiva (November 1, 2015), ISBN 9788539007202
- Paperback, Turkish. Pınar Umman (translator), "Dünyayla Benim Aramda" Monokl (January 1, 2016), ISBN 9786055159511
- Paperback, Romanian. Elena Marcu (translator), Adi Păun (translator), "Între lume și mine", Black Button Books (January 1, 2017), ISBN 9786069423790
- Paperback, Chinese. 塔-奈希西·科茨, 宋瑛堂 (translator) "在世界與我之間" 衛城出版 (October 5, 2016), ISBN 9789869351829
- Paperback, Hebrew. טא-נהסי קואטס, זהר אלמקייס (translator), בין העולם וביני" הקיבוץ המאוחד" (January 1, 2018)
- Hardcover, Italian. Chiara Stangalino (translator), "Tra me e il mondo" Codice (May 19, 2016), ISBN 9788875786052
- Hardcover, Slovenian. Petra Meterc (translator and foreword), "Med svetom in mano" Cankarjeva založba (November 1, 2021), ISBN 9789612824914
- Paperback, Arabic. تا نيهيسي كوتس, محمد فتحي خضر (translator), بين العالم وبيني" دار التنوير" (February 1, 2021), ISBN 9786144721629

== Television adaptation ==
On September 30, 2020, HBO announced that it had adapted Between the World and Me as an 80-minute-long television special, which premiered on November 21, 2020. Between the World and Me was initially adapted and staged in 2018 by the Apollo Theater in Harlem, New York. The HBO adaptation of Between the World and Me combines elements of the 2018 production at the Apollo Theater, readings from the book, and documentary footage from the actors’ home lives. Both the Apollo and HBO versions are directed by Kamilah Forbes. The HBO special included appearances by around 20 celebrities and civil rights activists including Oprah Winfrey, Phylicia Rashad, Angela Davis, Mahershala Ali, Joe Morton, Yara Shahidi and Angela Bassett. The production used Baltimore street scene photographs by John Clark Mayden, which the Baltimore Sun called "powerful images".

The book appears in the movie The Equalizer 2, with the protagonist Robert McCall (Denzel Washington) reading it during the train scene in Turkey.
