= The Message (Coates book) =

2024 nonfiction book by Ta-Nehisi Coates

- First edition cover
- Author: Ta-Nehisi Coates
- Audio read by: Ta-Nehisi Coates
- Language: English
- Publisher: One World
- Publication date: October 1, 2024
- Publication place: New York
- Media type: Print (hardcover and paperback), ebook, audiobook
- Pages: 256 pp.
- ISBN: 978-0-593-23038-1 (First edition hardcover)

The Message is a nonfiction book by American author Ta-Nehisi Coates, published on October 1, 2024, by Random House under its One World imprint. The Associated Press described the book as "part memoir, part travelogue, and part writing primer". The narrative reflects on his visits to Dakar, Senegal; Chapin, South Carolina; and the West Bank and East Jerusalem. The latter half of the book covers Coates's ten-day trip in the summer of 2023 to Israel-Palestine – his first time in the region – and his argument against "the elevation of factual complexity over self-evident morality". The New York Times called it "the heart of the book, and the part that is bound to attract the most attention". According to a profile in New York magazine, The Message "lays forth the case that the Israeli occupation is a moral crime, one that has been all but covered up by the West". In the book, Coates writes: "I don't think I ever, in my life, felt the glare of racism burn stranger and more intense than in Israel."

== Reception ==
Kirkus Reviews, in its starred review, evaluated the book as a "revelatory meditation on shattering journeys".

Jennifer Szalai of The New York Times questioned Coates's "conspicuous" choice to keep his coverage of contemporary Israel in his narrative to his ten-day trip — and not also include mention of the October 7 attack on Israel or the subsequent Israeli bombing of the Gaza Strip.

Daniel Bergner of The Atlantic condemned Coates as having sacrificed crucial complexity: "Purity of argument is Coates's desire; complexity, his self-declared enemy. In this, in his refusal to wrestle with conflicting realities, the essay feels desperate. It feels devoid of the layers and depths of the most profound moral writing, devoid of the universalist goal, the exploration of 'common humanity' that Coates has extolled. Complexity, not purity, is the essence of the moral and the humane."

Becca Rothfeld of The Washington Post defended the book from pro-Israel critics, but still described it as "disjointed, heavy-handed and frequently clichéd", pointing to sentences such as "The only way I ultimately survived was through stories" and "You wonder if human depravity has any bottom at all, and if it does not, what hope is there for any of us?" Perry Bacon Jr., also of The Washington Post, was more positive, saying that "the writing in this book is lyrical, the reporting richly detailed, and almost every page offers a new and important insight or articulates an idea you had in your head but hadn't fully put together". Likewise, Hassan Ali Kanu of The American Prospect was complimentary towards the book's lyrical qualities, writing that he found its treatments of the question of minority writers politicizing their works, and of colorism, black nationalism and social inequality in post-colonial African society compelling.

In a starred review, Publishers Weekly praised the book, stating unequivocally that "Coates delivers an incandescent rebuke of journalists—including himself—for parroting ideological narratives that reify Palestine’s oppression."

In Haaretz, the journalist and documentarian Noam Sheizaf wrote that while The Message was not the "ultimate book" about Israel's occupation of the West Bank, it nevertheless offered a "critical perspective" for liberal Israeli readers.

The Message featured as one of the 28 best books of Fall 2024 selected by Oprah Daily, where the reviewer noted: "In each location, Coates negotiates the double-edged sword of language: the mythmaking that builds these oppressive systems and the witness bearing that promises to undo them. At once a rallying cry and a love letter to writing itself, the book is an urgent reminder that 'politics is the art of the possible, but art creates the possible of politics.'"

Writing in The Oberlin Review, editor-in-chief Nikki Keating said in conclusion about Coates: "His reflections remind us that writing is more than a craft; it is a duty, a means of preserving truth, and a path to liberation. Through his travels and reflections, Coates shows that we each have the power to honor our past and to fight for a just future — whether by sharing stories of resilience from Senegal, standing up to censorship in South Carolina, or bearing witness to struggles in the West Bank."

In The Guardian, Aamna Mohdin praises The Message as Ta-Nehisi Coates's powerful return to nonfiction, comparing its impact to the 1982 hip-hop song of the same name by Grandmaster Flash and the Furious Five.

=== CBS Mornings interview ===
Tony Dokoupil, co-anchor of CBS Mornings television program, in an interview with Coates on September 30, 2024, took exception to the chapter of the book dedicated to the Israeli-Palestinian conflict. Dokoupil implied that The Message "reads like the work of an extremist" and he also questioned whether Coates denied Israel's right to exist or was offended by the mere existence of a Jewish state.

Following the interview, Tony Dokoupil met with members of the CBS News's Race and Culture Unit after a group of CBS News employees expressed concern to executives about the way he had handled the interview, focusing on Dokoupil's "tone of voice, phrasing and body language". Network executives Adrienne Roark and Wendy McMahon said in an all-staff meeting, audio of which was leaked by The Free Press, that the interview had not followed the network's principle of neutrality, though legal correspondent Jan Crawford pushed back and defended Dokoupil. Dokoupil was also defended by Paramount chair Shari Redstone. Rothfeld accused both Dokoupil and The Free Press's Coleman Hughes, who wrote that Coates had a "desire to smear Israel", of "perform[ing] an activity that barely even resembles reading. In their haste to peg Coates as the Face of a Movement, they are intent on doing anything and everything but attending to the actual book he has written."
