= Jan Crawford =

American TV journalist

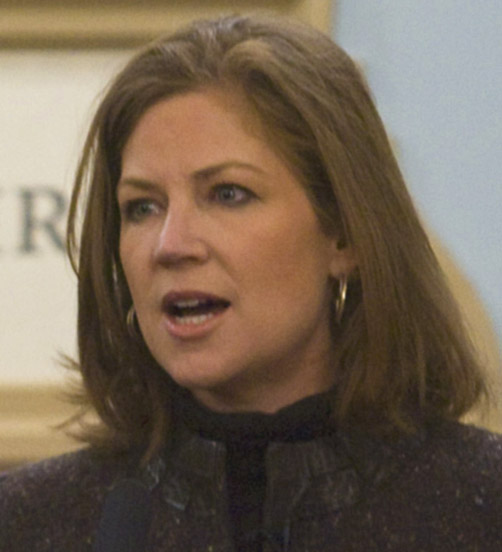
- Crawford in 2010
- Born: Alabama, U.S.
- Education: University of Alabama (BA); University of Chicago (JD)
- Occupation: Journalist
- Employer: CBS News
- Notable credit: Supreme Conflict
- Spouse: Douglas Greenburg
- Children: 4

Jan Crawford Greenburg is an American television journalist, author, and attorney. She serves as a political correspondent and chief legal correspondent for CBS News and previously for ABC News. She appears regularly on the CBS Evening News, Face the Nation, CBS This Morning, and CBS News Sunday Morning. She led CBS News's coverage of the 2012 Presidential Elections. She is a New York Times bestselling author of Supreme Conflict: The Inside Story of the Struggle for Control of the United States Supreme Court and also a member of the New York State Bar Association.

== Early life and education ==
Crawford grew up on a farm in Baileyton, Alabama. She graduated from Albert P. Brewer High School, then enrolled at the University of Alabama, where she obtained her Bachelor of Arts in 1987. For the academic year 1985–1986, Crawford served as the editor-in-chief of the student daily newspaper The Crimson White. Crawford graduated from the University of Chicago Law School in 1993.

== Career ==
She joined the Chicago Tribune as a reporter in 1987. After graduating from law school, she began covering legal affairs for the Tribune, which put her on the Supreme Court beat in 1994. In 1996, she won the Tribune's top reporting award for her work in a 13-part series on the South a generation after the civil rights movement. In 2001, her work was honored with the Tribune's top reporting award. In his first television interview, Chief Justice John Roberts talked to Crawford about the court, his views on the law, and his life since taking office. Justice John Paul Stevens also chose Crawford for his first network television interview, reflecting on his memories of the man who appointed him to the Supreme Court in 1975, former President Gerald R. Ford, on the occasion of Ford's funeral.

From 1998 until 2007, Crawford provided legal analysis on the Supreme Court for The NewsHour with Jim Lehrer. She helped to provide live, gavel-to-gavel coverage on PBS of the Supreme Court confirmation hearings of Chief Justice Roberts and Justice Alito, and served as the Supreme Court analyst for Face the Nation on CBS. From 2007 to 2009, she had been senior legal correspondent for ABC and wrote a blog titled "Legalities." In 2010, she began work for CBS, with a blog called "Crossroads." Currently she is the chief legal and political correspondent for CBS.

Crawford has taught journalism at American University and frequently speaks about the court to universities, law schools, legal organizations, and civic groups.

On October 18, 2026, Crawford tweeted praise of a man–later revealed to be Thomas Teepell, a Republican political strategist–who asked Michigan Democratic Senate nominee Abdul El-Sayed to denounce the Muslim Brotherhood. Crawford deleted the tweet later that day, and admitted that it had violated CBS News standards.

== Personal life ==
She is married to Douglas Greenburg, who graduated from University of Chicago Law School with her in 1993. They have four children.

== Bibliography ==
- Jan Crawford Greenburg, Supreme Conflict: The Inside Story of the Struggle for Control of the United States Supreme Court New York : Penguin Press, 2007. ISBN 9781594201011
