= Contract Buyers League =

The Contract Buyers League (CBL) was a grassroots organization formed in 1968 by residents of North Lawndale, a Chicago, Illinois community. The CBL was founded in order to address the exploitative practices of predatory land contracts in African American communities. The organization played a significant role in raising awareness about the issue and advocating for fair and affordable housing rights. Assisted by Jack Macnamara, a Jesuit seminarian, and twelve white college students based at Presentation Catholic Church, led by Msgr. John "Jack" Egan, the CBL fought the discriminatory real estate practice known as “contract selling.”

== History ==
Following World War II, Chicago's South Side had become increasingly overcrowded as African Americans moved from the South in the second wave of the Great Migration. Unable to attain decent and sanitary housing in white neighborhoods because of racially restrictive real estate covenants and mortgage redlining by the Federal Housing Administration (FHA), African Americans were confined to the South Side ghetto.

They finally began to move into new neighborhoods. In the 1950s-60s, real estate speculators exploited white homeowners’ fears on the West Side of plummeting real estate values because of neighborhoods that had ethnic change. Realtors went door-to-door to persuade white homeowners to sell because blacks were moving into the neighborhood. In neighborhoods they wished to exploit, “panic-peddling” speculators hired black men to drive beat-up cars with the music blaring and paid black women to push their babies in strollers. Speculators made enormous profits by convincing whites to sell their homes at well-below market value and then reselling to blacks at much higher than market value. Black homebuyers were subject to a “race tax,” as a property would typically be bought from a white homeowner for $10,000 and resold a week later to a black family for $25,000.

The FHA's refusal to lend to blacks meant that they could not buy overpriced homes except on contract, but the title to a property bought on contract would not be transferred to the buyer until all contract payments had been made. Trapped in overwhelming debt, contract buyers were charged exorbitant fees for repairs to correct building code violations, which speculators had concealed from them. In order to afford payments, contract buyers were forced to work two or three jobs, separating them from their families. Buyers who missed a single payment would be evicted with no right to recoup prior payments. Speculators would then resell the property to another black household under the same terms.

The process of “blockbusting” was a national phenomenon. But, the practice of contract selling reached its peak in North Lawndale, where an estimated 3,000 buildings were sold on contract. This contributed to the neighborhood's population changing from 87% white in 1950 to 91% black in 1960.

The Contract Buyers League emerged in response to widespread racial discrimination and segregation in Chicago during the 1960s. African American families seeking homeownership opportunities often faced limited options due to discriminatory lending practices and redlining. Predatory land contracts, also known as contract-for-deed agreements, became an alternative method for purchasing homes in racially segregated neighborhoods.

Under these contracts, buyers made regular payments directly to the seller instead of securing traditional mortgages. However, the terms of the contracts were often highly exploitative, including exorbitant interest rates, excessive down payments, and minimal legal protections for the buyers. This left many African American families vulnerable to exploitation and at risk of losing their homes and investments.

== Formation and activism ==
The Contract Buyers League was formed in 1968 by a group of African American homeowners who had experienced the hardships and injustices of predatory land contracts. Their goal was to organize and advocate for fair and equitable housing conditions for African American communities in Chicago.

Led by civil rights activists such as Charles A. Lewis, the CBL mobilized affected homeowners to collectively challenge the unfair practices they faced. The organization worked tirelessly to educate its members about their legal rights and provided support to those trapped in exploitative contracts. They also partnered with community organizations, lawyers, and sympathetic politicians to address the issue at various levels.

The CBL gained national attention through its grassroots organizing efforts, media campaigns, and protests. Members of the organization held demonstrations, picketed real estate offices, and staged sit-ins at local government offices to demand changes in housing policies and regulations.

== Impact and legacy ==
The Contract Buyers League made significant strides in raising public awareness about the inequities of predatory land contracts. Their activism and advocacy efforts led to increased scrutiny of these practices and ultimately influenced policy changes at the local and national levels. Their fight for fair housing rights laid the groundwork for subsequent reforms in housing and lending practices. The CBL's work contributed to the passage of the federal Fair Housing Act of 1968, which prohibited housing discrimination based on race, color, religion, sex, or national origin.

The legacy of the Contract Buyers League continues to inspire contemporary housing justice movements. Their efforts shed light on systemic inequalities in housing and serve as a reminder of the ongoing struggle for fair and affordable housing opportunities for marginalized communities.

== Other entities ==
Groups similar to the CBL formed in cities around the country to combat contract selling. The CBL was the most influential in winning justice for exploited black homebuyers. The CBL renegotiated 400 contracts for its members, saving residents an estimated $25,000,000. The FHA finally responded to pressure from the CBL by reforming its discriminatory underwriting policies in order to lend to blacks.

== See also ==
- Institutional racism
- Blockbusting
- Real estate covenants
- Redlining
