= 2004 Democratic National Convention keynote address =

Speech by Barack Obama

Barack Obama delivering the keynote address at the 2004 Democratic National Convention

On July 27, 2004, future United States president Barack Obama delivered the keynote address at the 2004 Democratic National Convention, officially titled The Audacity of Hope. At the time, Obama was a member of the Illinois Senate and the Democratic Party nominee for the 2004 United States Senate election in Illinois. His unexpectedly large victory in the March primary had already made him a rising star within the party, and led to the reissue of his 1995 memoir, Dreams from My Father. The speech was well received, which further elevated Obama's political profile and led to his reissued memoir becoming a bestseller.

Obama was selected to deliver the keynote by Democratic presidential nominee John Kerry and his campaign in early July 2004, after Kerry was impressed during joint appearances by the two candidates in Illinois. Obama largely wrote the speech himself, with later edits from the Kerry campaign. It was delivered on the second night of the convention. In just under twenty minutes, the address included a biographical sketch of Obama, his vision of America, and the reasons for his support for Kerry. Unlike almost all prior and subsequent convention keynote addresses, it was not televised by the commercial broadcast networks and was only seen by a combined television audience of about nine million on PBS, cable news stations, and C-SPAN. Nevertheless, the speech is credited with launching Obama's national political career and leading to his 2008 election as president. Since its delivery, several academics have studied the speech, both for the various narratives it describes as well as its implications for racial reconciliation.

== Background ==
In 1996, Barack Obama was elected to the Illinois Senate. After a losing campaign for United States House of Representatives in 2000, he began a campaign for United States Senate in 2003. On March 16, 2004, Obama won a surprising majority of the vote in the Democratic primary for Senate. As the Democratic nominee, Obama made two joint appearances with presumptive presidential nominee John Kerry in Chicago during the spring. The joint campaign events left Kerry and his campaign impressed by Obama.

In April, after Kerry had secured the Democratic nomination, Kerry campaign manager Mary Beth Cahill began considering possible candidates to deliver the keynote address at the 2004 Democratic National Convention. The keynote address is traditionally an opportunity for one of the party's leading orators to demonstrate support for the nominee and raise their own political profile. Searching for a speaker who would generate media attention, the campaign considered Michigan governor Jennifer Granholm, Arizona governor Janet Napolitano, Iowa governor Tom Vilsack, Virginia governor Mark Warner, and New Mexico governor Bill Richardson. Others involved in the process included convention manager Jack Corrigan and Kerry media advisor Robert Shrum. Corrigan's friend, Lisa Hay, strongly recommended Obama on the basis of their time together working on the Harvard Law Review.

Cahill had previously seen Obama in Time magazine and solicited opinions from people who knew and had worked with him. Some within the campaign expressed concern over his speaking style, lack of experience with a teleprompter, opposition to the Iraq War (which Kerry had initially supported), and relatively junior position as a state senator. During the process, the Obama campaign provided an eight-minute audition video, and several Obama advisors lobbied on his behalf. The Kerry campaign eventually chose Obama over Granholm, in part because polls showed Kerry with weaker-than-expected support among African Americans and because he was running for an important Senate seat.

According to Obama, he was told several weeks after campaigning with Kerry that he would have some kind of speaking role at the convention. He was reportedly called sometime right before the Independence Day holiday by Cahill, who told him that he was chosen to be the keynote speaker. Kerry first publicly hinted Obama would deliver the address on June 29, and the official announcement was made on July 14.

== Drafting ==
Obama began drafting his speech at a hotel in Springfield, Illinois, several days after receiving the call from Cahill. According to his memoir, also titled The Audacity of Hope, Obama stated that he began by considering his own campaign themes and specific issues he wished to address. While remembering the various people he had met and stories he had heard during his campaign, he was reminded of a sermon by his pastor, Jeremiah Wright, on the subject of the George Frederic Watts painting Hope. The title of Wright's sermon was "The Audacity to Hope," but Obama recalled it as "The Audacity of Hope", which became the title for his convention speech and later of his second book.

The first draft was written in longhand, and Obama reportedly labored over it for some two weeks, often beyond midnight. Dan Shomon, his campaign political director, referred to the speech as "a greatest hits collection of rhetoric drawn from his stump speeches." Obama also watched and read previous keynote addresses during the process. Although he was originally granted eight minutes for the speech, the initial draft ran for 25 minutes, leading to two more weeks of edits with advisors to reduce it to 17 minutes. The final draft was sent to a Democratic speechwriting team at the FleetCenter around July 20. Although some biographical material was removed to focus on the Kerry campaign, reports on the process indicated that three-quarters or more of the Obama draft was left intact after the Kerry campaign's edits. After delivering it, Obama acknowledged that his and Kerry's staffs had reviewed the speech for length, noting, however, that he was proud to have written it himself along with most of his other speeches.

== Convention and final preparations ==
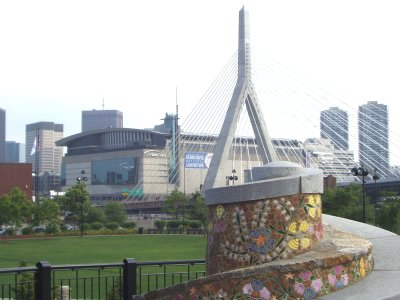
The FleetCenter in Boston during the 2004 DNC.

The 2004 Democratic National Convention was held at the FleetCenter in Boston, Massachusetts, from July 26 to 29, 2004. Obama was scheduled to address the delegates on the second night. The Obama campaign was unhappy with the time slot and hoped to change it, as that night would not be covered by the major television networks.

After delaying his trip for a budget vote at the Illinois state capitol, Obama arrived in Boston at 1:30 am EDT on Sunday, July 25, on a chartered Hawker jet. On the same morning, Obama made his first appearance on Meet the Press. During an interview with the host, Tim Russert, Obama touched on his aims for the speech:

What I'd like to do is talk about the vision the Democratic Party has for this country. You know, I think that there's enormous strength in the country, enormous resilience in the country, but people are struggling, and as I've been traveling throughout Illinois over the last 18 months, what I've been seeing are people who are concerned about their economic security, concerned about their ability to pay for their health care, their kids, sending them to college, and if we can project an optimistic vision that says we can be stronger at home, more respected abroad, and that John Kerry has the message and the strength to lead us in that fashion, then I think we'll be successful.

He also appeared on Face the Nation and Late Edition with Wolf Blitzer.

On July 27, the morning before his speech, Obama appeared on Good Morning America. When asked how he would deal with the fact that he was against the 2003 invasion of Iraq while Kerry and his running mate John Edwards supported the resolution approving the use of military force, Obama responded that they were focused on the future instead of looking back at the past. Obama also said that his wife, Michelle, had given him advice for the speech: "Don't screw it up."

During another interview that morning with NPR, Obama referred to discussion of his prospects as a presidential candidate as silly, and addressed the risk of being typecast, as another young, African American politician (Harold Ford Jr.) had given the 2000 keynote. In the afternoon, he gave a speech on environmental policy to a small crowd at Boston Harbor. According to Martin Nesbitt, on the afternoon before the speech, Nesbitt likened Obama to a rock star because of the crowd growing behind them, and Obama replied, "Yeah, if you think it’s bad today, wait until tomorrow. My speech is pretty good."

During advance preparations, some Obama advisors were concerned because it was the first time the candidate had used a teleprompter. He conducted three one-hour practice sessions in the FleetCenter locker rooms and reportedly had difficulty with the teleprompter, while also adapting to various techniques for speaking to a live convention crowd and television audience. During preprataions, he met Kerry staffer and speechwriter Jon Favreau, who would later become Obama's own speechwriter. Favreau informed Obama that a sentence in his speech, "We're not red states and blue states; we're all Americans, standing up together for the red, white, and blue," would be removed to avoid overlap with Kerry's acceptance speech, which included the sentence, "Maybe some just see us divided into those red states and blue states, but I see us as one America: red, white, and blue." It is unclear whether or not this line existed in Kerry's speech before the campaign reviewed Obama's, but regardless, its removal reportedly angered Obama.

== Speech ==
After an introduction by Illinois senator Dick Durbin, Obama stepped on stage shortly before 9:45 pm EDT to the 1964 song "Keep On Pushing" by The Impressions. Obama spoke for 17 minutes, interrupted 33 times by audience applause. The final speech was 2,297 words long.

After thanking Durbin and acknowledging the privilege to speak, Obama immediately launched into a brief autobiographical sketch covering his Kenyan grandfather's work as a domestic servant for the British and his own father, who had obtained a scholarship to study in the United States. He then spoke of his mother's family, describing his grandfather, Stanley, fighting under George S. Patton in World War II, while his grandmother Madelyn worked on a bomber assembly line and raised his mother. Obama explained the African name given to him by his parents meant "blessed," concluding:

I stand here today, grateful for the diversity of my heritage, aware that my parents’ dreams live on in my two precious daughters. I stand here knowing that my story is part of the larger American story, that I owe a debt to all of those who came before me, and that in no other country on Earth is my story even possible.

Obama next mentioned several Americans he had met who were struggling with jobs, healthcare, and education, stating, "People don't expect government to solve all their problems, but they sense, deep in their bones, that with just a slight change in priorities, we can make sure that every child in America has a decent shot at life, and that the doors of opportunity remain open to all."

In the next segment of his address, Obama mentioned John Kerry for the first time, listing his major values and beliefs, interrupted by a story of a young Marine he had met and an affirmation that when military action is undertaken, the families and soldiers involved must be cared for and that there is an obligation to "never ever go to war without enough troops to win the war, secure the peace, and earn the respect of the world." Obama affirmed Kerry's commitment to keep America secure.

Obama next addressed community and unity in the United States, inverting the Book of Genesis to argue, "I am my brother's keeper," and that a person struggling somewhere affects us even if we are not directly involved. Referring to the "spin masters" and "negative ad peddlers," who he claimed sought to divide the country, Obama declared:

Well, I say to them tonight, there is not a liberal America and a conservative America — there is the United States of America. There is not a black America and a white America and Latino America and Asian America — there's the United States of America. The pundits like to slice-and-dice our country into red states and blue states; red states for Republicans, blue states for Democrats. But I've got news for them, too: We worship an awesome God in the blue states, and we don't like federal agents poking around in our libraries in the red states. We coach Little League in the blue states, and, yes, we've got some gay friends in the red states. There are patriots who opposed the war in Iraq and there are patriots who supported the war in Iraq.

Asking whether the country wished to engage in a politics of cynicism or hope, he argued that Kerry and Edwards called on a long American tradition of hope:

It's the hope of slaves sitting around a fire singing freedom songs. The hope of immigrants setting out for distant shores. The hope of a young naval lieutenant bravely patrolling the Mekong Delta. The hope of a mill worker's son who dares to defy the odds. The hope of a skinny kid with a funny name who believes that America has a place for him too. Hope! Hope in the face of difficulty! Hope in the face of uncertainty! The audacity of hope! In the end, that is God's greatest gift to us, the bedrock of this nation. A belief in things not seen. A belief that there are better days ahead.

To conclude, Obama said that he believed "we have a righteous wind at our backs" and expressed confidence in the country's ability to meet the current challenges. He concluded by expressing his belief that Kerry and Edwards would be elected, and with their inauguration, "this country will reclaim its promise, and out of this long political darkness, a brighter day will come."

== Reception ==
=== Family ===
After the speech Obama and his wife were interviewed by Brian Williams, and when asked about what she thought, Michelle replied, "And all I have to say is, honey, you didn't screw it up, so good job." Obama said that he hoped his two daughters had watched the whole event, as their baby-sitter was permitted to let them stay up only if they watched the convention. Obama's grandmother, Madelyn Dunham, called Obama after the speech and told him, "You did well...I just kind of worry about you. I hope you keep your head on straight." She was later quoted by a journalist: "I was a little amazed. It was really quite an exceptional speech, or I'm being prejudiced, I don't know. But, to me, it was really quite exceptional."

=== News media and pundits ===
Immediately after the speech MSNBC host Chris Matthews admitted, "I have to tell you, a little chill in my legs right now. That is an amazing moment in history right there. It is surely an amazing moment. A keynoter like I have never heard." He added later in the night, "...I have seen the first black president there. And the reason I say that is because I think the immigrant experience combined with the African background, combined with the incredible education, combined with his beautiful speech, not every politician gets help with the speech, but that speech was a piece of work." Commenting the next day, Pat Buchanan, while complimentary towards Obama, was more critical of what he called a centrist speech: "He is hiding what he truly believes. What does Obama believe about this war?" On PBS, columnist David Brooks responded positively, "This is why you go to conventions, to watch a speech like this," while Mark Shields said, "A star is born."

Former Jimmy Carter speechwriter Hendrik Hertzberg considered it slightly better than Mario Cuomo's 1984 keynote address, stating, "If he wrote that speech, then he should be president, because it's such a great speech. If he didn't, he should be president because he found such a great speechwriter." Martin Medhurst, a professor of rhetoric and communications at Baylor University, disagreed about it being better than Cuomo's, even if it was an exceptional performance. Stressing that it was too early to make any predictions, he noted that new political stars were not normally created because of keynote addresses.

Tom Brokaw asked rhetorically whether Obama or Kerry would be the man more remembered from the convention, while CNN's Jeff Greenfield called it "one of the really great keynote speeches of the last quarter-century." Howard Fineman noted that Obama's emphasis on parents, not government in teaching children was the same kind of language that could have been heard amongst Republicans. Rice University historian Douglas Brinkley stated, "Obama trumped Bill Clinton. Clinton gave a good speech yesterday. Obama was better. That's hard to do in American politics."

==== Newspapers ====
The day after the speech, a Chicago Tribune editorial declared Obama "The Phenom". The Washington Times acknowledged that it would likely disagree with Obama's policies, but compared with John Edwards' speech, "his sentiments had a freshness and a realness that Mr. Edwards' lacked." A reporter for Britain's The Independent declared that the mantle of who was most likely to be the first black president had passed from Colin Powell to Obama, though another was left unimpressed, finding the speech "disappointingly free of original thought". Kenya's The Nation also covered the speech, and noted his use of biography, particularly his Kenyan heritage. A columnist for The Christian Science Monitor acknowledged that many aspects of his speech were typical of political speeches, but that Obama had managed to make it appear as though they were something new and exciting. Speaking of the broadcast networks that had not covered the address, the column said, "They missed the national debut of what could be one of the most exciting and important voices in American politics in the next half century."

=== Politicians ===
Obama's fellow Illinois Democrats praised him after the speech. Illinois Speaker of the House Michael Madigan reacted by saying, "He is a star...For Barack, the sky's the limit," while Chicago Mayor Richard M. Daley said, "He hit a grand slam home run." Senate President Emil Jones responded, "It was such a moving speech that I had tears in my eyes...It was electrifying. When I looked around the room, all across the people were so emotional, tears in their eyes. They're crying. A great individual, a great Illinoisan." Governor Rod Blagojevich stated, "After the speech last night, I would think that even if he had an opponent, he might get 100 percent of the vote." Former Illinois Senator Carol Moseley Braun said, "Obama represents the best of what we brought from our generation...he represents a kind of division within the Democratic Party. It's not the old left."

New York Senator Hillary Clinton, who would later run against Obama for the Democratic nomination in 2008 and go on to serve as his Secretary of State during his presidency, was quoted saying, "I thought that was one of the most electrifying moments that I can remember at any convention." Alabama Representative Artur Davis pushed the idea of Obama running for president, stating, "If anyone can do it, Obama can...Obama may help break down the stereotypes that an African-American politician is someone only for other blacks...When Obama runs for the White House, he will run not as a candidate for blacks. He has the capacity to run as a candidate for everyone."

=== Academics ===
In an article entitled "An Immigrant's Dream and the Audacity of Hope" in the American Behavioral Scientist, Babak Elahi and Grant Cos compare Obama's speech to the one given by California Governor Arnold Schwarzenegger at the 2004 Republican National Convention, both utilizing an "immigrant dream narrative". They observe that in Obama's rhetorical shift away from his own biography and back toward that of John Kerry, he was able to make a convincing argument that Senator Kerry, through his own service to the country, was an "honorary immigrant", and thus that Kerry too had chosen to be an American citizen.

In "Recasting the American Dream and American Politics", Robert C. Rowland and John M. Jones, two professors of communications, argue that the disconnect between what policies the majority of the American public reported supporting (more liberal) and the political label the plurality used to describe themselves as (conservative) had to do with the fact that America's romantic narrative, the search for the American Dream, had become closely associated with Ronald Reagan and conservatives, and that in a keynote address unremarkable in its basic themes, Obama sought to recast the narrative as one associated with liberals. Whereas Reagan's narrative focused heavily on individualism, Obama used the metaphor of hope to call for a balance between those individual values and community values, the latter also being necessary for the achievement of the American Dream.

David A. Frank at the University of Oregon compares Obama's speech with the one given by Al Sharpton at the same convention, stating that while Sharpton did not stray beyond familiar themes of African American trauma, Obama broadened his scope to include all races and classes in a narrative that "harkened back to the Roosevelt-Johnson legacy of shared purpose and coalition..." In an alternative reading, Mark Lawrence McPhail criticizes Obama, stating that his "reduction of black trauma to 'slaves sitting around a fire singing freedom songs'" romanticizes the historical realities of black suffering and borders on the stereotypical image of the "'happy darkie' of traditional racism", and that his speech did not contribute to an open conversation about racism that is ultimately necessary for racial reconciliation.

== Audience ==
Roughly 9.1 million people were reported to have watched the Democratic convention on the night of the speech, ratings which were described as "tepid" by Variety, as it only amounted to "about half the audience tuning into regularly scheduled summer programming the week before", and was less than the 10.3 million people who tuned into the second night of the 2000 DNC. However, neither ABC, CBS, nor NBC provided any coverage of the convention that night (some Chicago affiliates did broadcast Obama's speech), leading to criticism from some columnists. But with major networks not covering the evening's events, other stations received greater viewership, including 3 million viewers for PBS, followed by CNN, Fox News, and MSNBC.

== Aftermath ==
That night Fox News reported that people had been taking the Obama signs from the convention floor as keepsakes, whereas many signs for Teresa Heinz-Kerry were still on the floor.

In an interview with JET, Obama acknowledged that the speech had exceeded peoples' expectations and that he felt encouraged by the fact that many people appeared to respond to the themes of common values and working together. When asked about all the presidential speculation, Obama responded, "I just need to win the Senate right now."

After easily defeating Alan Keyes to win his Senate seat and being sworn into office on January 4, 2005, Obama wrote The Audacity of Hope, which was released in October 2006. Despite initially saying that he had no immediate plans to run for president and would serve out his full Senate term, Obama would go on to run for and be elected the 44th President of the United States on November 4, 2008, defeating John McCain and becoming the first African American to be elected to the nation's highest office. On November 6, 2012, Obama was reelected to a second term as President of the United States, defeating former Massachusetts governor Mitt Romney. His presidency has been consistently praised by the general public in surveys and by presidential historians in presidential greatness rankings.

Obama nominated John Kerry to serve as his Secretary of State during the former's second term, as Hillary Clinton declined to stay on; Kerry was subsequently confirmed and served as Secretary of State until the conclusion of Obama's presidency in January 2017.

Ten years after the speech, The Washington Post noted its historic nature and everything that followed from it: "Then the next ten years happened."
