= List of C-SPAN Q&A interviews first aired in 2017 =

Q&A is an interview series on the C-SPAN network that typically airs every Sunday night. It is hosted by C-SPAN founder Brian Lamb. Its stated purpose is to feature discussions with "interesting people who are making things happen in politics, the media, education, and science & technology in hour-long conversations about their lives and their work."

Original air date (Links to video)	Interviewee(s)	Comments
January 1, 2016	Ronald Shafer	Featured discussion of Shafer's book The Carnival Campaign: How the Rollicking 1840 Campaign of “Tippecanoe and Tyler Too” Changed Presidential Elections Forever.
January 8, 2017	Rosemary Stevens	Featured discussion of Stevens's book A Time of Scandal: Charles R. Forbes, Warren G. Harding, and the Making of the Veterans Bureau.
January 15, 2017	Maya MacGuineas	Featured discussion of MacGuineas's experiences as president of the Committee for a Responsible Federal Budget.
January 22, 2017	Benjamin Ginsberg	Featured discussion of Ginsberg's book What Washington Gets Wrong: The Unelected Officials Who Actually Run the Government and Their Misconceptions about the American People.
January 29, 2017	John Nixon	Featured discussion of Nixon's book Debriefing the President: The Interrogation of Saddam Hussein.
February 5, 2017	Heather McGhee	Featured discussion of McGhee's experiences as president of the think tank Demos, and her friendship with a caller to C-SPAN's Washington Journal program who asked her how he could become less prejudiced.
February 12, 2017	Edward Jay Epstein	Featured discussion of Epstein's book How America Lost Its Secrets: Edward Snowden, the Man and the Theft.
February 19, 2017	Barbara Feinman Todd	Featured discussion of Todd's book Pretend I'm Not Here: How I Worked with Three Newspaper Icons, One Powerful First Lady, and Still Managed to Dig Myself Out of the Washington Swamp.
February 26, 2017	Alexandra Wolfe	Featured discussion of Wolfe's book Valley of the Gods: A Silicon Valley Story.
March 5, 2017	Brody Mullins	Featured discussion of Mullins's Wall Street Journal story, "The Rise and Fall of a K Street Renegade", about former lobbyist Evan Morris (lobbyist).
March 12, 2017	Sandra Navidi	Featured discussion of Navidi's book SuperHubs: How the Financial Elite and Their Networks Rule Our World.
March 19, 2017	Sheelah Kolhatkar	Featured discussion of Kolhatkar's book Black Edge: Inside Information, Dirty Money, and the Quest to Bring Down the Most Wanted Man on Wall Street.
March 26, 2017	Thomas Sowell	Featured discussion of Sowell's career and retirement.
April 2, 2017	Michael Doran	Featured discussion of Doran's book Ike's Gamble: America's Rise to Dominance in the Middle East.
April 9, 2017	John Farrell	Featured discussion of Farrell's book Richard Nixon: The Life.
April 16, 2017	United States Senate Youth Program	
April 23, 2017	David McCullough	Featured discussion of McCullough's book The American Spirit: Who We Are and What We Stand For.
April 30, 2017	Brad Snyder	Featured discussion of Snyder's book The House of Truth: A Washington Political Salon and the Foundations of American Liberalism.
May 7, 2017	Chris Cavas	Featured discussion of the U.S. Navy's Fat Leonard scandal.
May 14, 2017	Mark Cheathem	Featured discussion of Cheathem's book Andrew Jackson, Southerner.
May 21, 2017	T.R. Reid	Featured discussion of Reid's book A Fine Mess: A Global Quest for a Simpler, Fairer, and More Efficient Tax System.
May 28, 2017	Malcolm Nance	Featured discussion of Nance's books The Plot to Hack America and Hacking ISIS.
June 4, 2017	Thomas Hazlett	Featured discussion of Hazlett's book The Political Spectrum.
June 11, 2017	Paul Sparrow	Featured discussion of Sparrow's role as director of the Franklin D. Roosevelt Presidential Library and Museum in Hyde Park, New York.
June 18, 2017	David Garrow	Part one of a discussion on Garrow's book Rising Star: The Making of Barack Obama.
June 25, 2017	Robert Caro	Featured discussion of Caro's audiobook On Power, and his experience writing the five-volume work The Years of Lyndon Johnson.
July 2, 2017	Pat Buchanan	Featured discussion of Buchanan's book Nixon’s White House Wars.
July 9, 2017	Brooke Gladstone	Featured discussion of Gladstone's book The Trouble with Reality: A Rumination on Moral Panic in our Time.
July 16, 2017	Manal Al-Sharif	Featured discussion of Al-Sharif's book Daring to Drive: A Saudi Woman’s Awakening.
July 23, 2017	David Garrow	Part two of a discussion on Garrow's book Rising Star: The Making of Barack Obama.
July 30, 2017	Mark Bowden	Featured discussion of Bowden's book Hue 1968: A Turning Point of the American War in Vietnam.
August 6, 2017	Cate Lineberry	Featured discussion of Lineberry's book Be Free or Die, about the life of Robert Smalls.
August 13, 2017	Paul Butler	Featured discussion of Butler's book Chokehold: Policing Black Men.
August 20, 2017	Carl Cannon	Featured discussion of Cannon's book On This Date: From the Pilgrims to Today, Discovering America One Day at a Time.
August 27, 2017	Tom Ricks	Featured discussion of Ricks's book Churchill and Orwell: The Fight for Freedom.
September 3, 2017	Anthony Clark	Featured discussion of Clark's book The Last Campaign: How Presidents Rewrite History, Run for Posterity & Enshrine Their Legacies.
September 10, 2017	Adam Andrzejewski	Featured discussion of Andrzejewski's role as the founder of the watchdog organization OpenTheBooks.
September 17, 2017	Randall Eliason	Featured discussion of Eliason's role as a federal prosecutor.
September 24, 2017	Ann Telnaes	Featured discussion of Telnaes' experience as an editorial cartoonist for The Washington Post.
October 1, 2017	Scott Greenberger	Featured discussion of Greenberger's book The Unexpected President: The Life and Times of Chester A. Arthur.
October 8, 2017	Wil Hylton	Featured discussion of Hylton's New York Times Magazine article "Down the Breitbart Hole".
October 15, 2017	William Taubman	Featured discussion of Taubman's biography of Mikhail Gorbachev.
October 22, 2017	Sherman Gillums, Jr.	Featured discussion of Gillums' role as Executive Director of Paralyzed Veterans of America.
October 29, 2017	Allison Stanger	Featured discussion of Stanger's experience interviewing political scientist Charles Murray at Middlebury College in Vermont, and the subsequent incident that left her injured.
November 5, 2017	Ron Chernow	Featured discussion of Chernow's biography of Ulysses Grant.
November 12, 2017	David Dalin	Featured discussion of Dalin's book Jewish Justices of the Supreme Court.
November 19, 2017	Daryl Davis	Featured discussion of Davis's efforts to befriend members of the Ku Klux Klan and convince them of the error of their beliefs.
November 26, 2017	Robert W. Merry	Featured discussion of Merry's book President McKinley: Architect of the American Century.
December 3, 2017	John Cogan	Featured discussion of Cogan's book The High Cost of Good Intentions.
December 10, 2017	Tiffany Wright	Featured discussion of Wright's experience as a clerk for Supreme Court Justice Sonia Sotomayor.
December 17, 2017	Gordon S. Wood	Featured discussion of Wood's book Friends Divided, about the relationship between John Adams and Thomas Jefferson.
December 24, 2017	Lee Edwards	Featured discussion of Edwards' memoir, Just Right: A Life in Pursuit of Liberty.
