= Punahou Circle apartments =

Apartment building in Honolulu, Hawaii, US

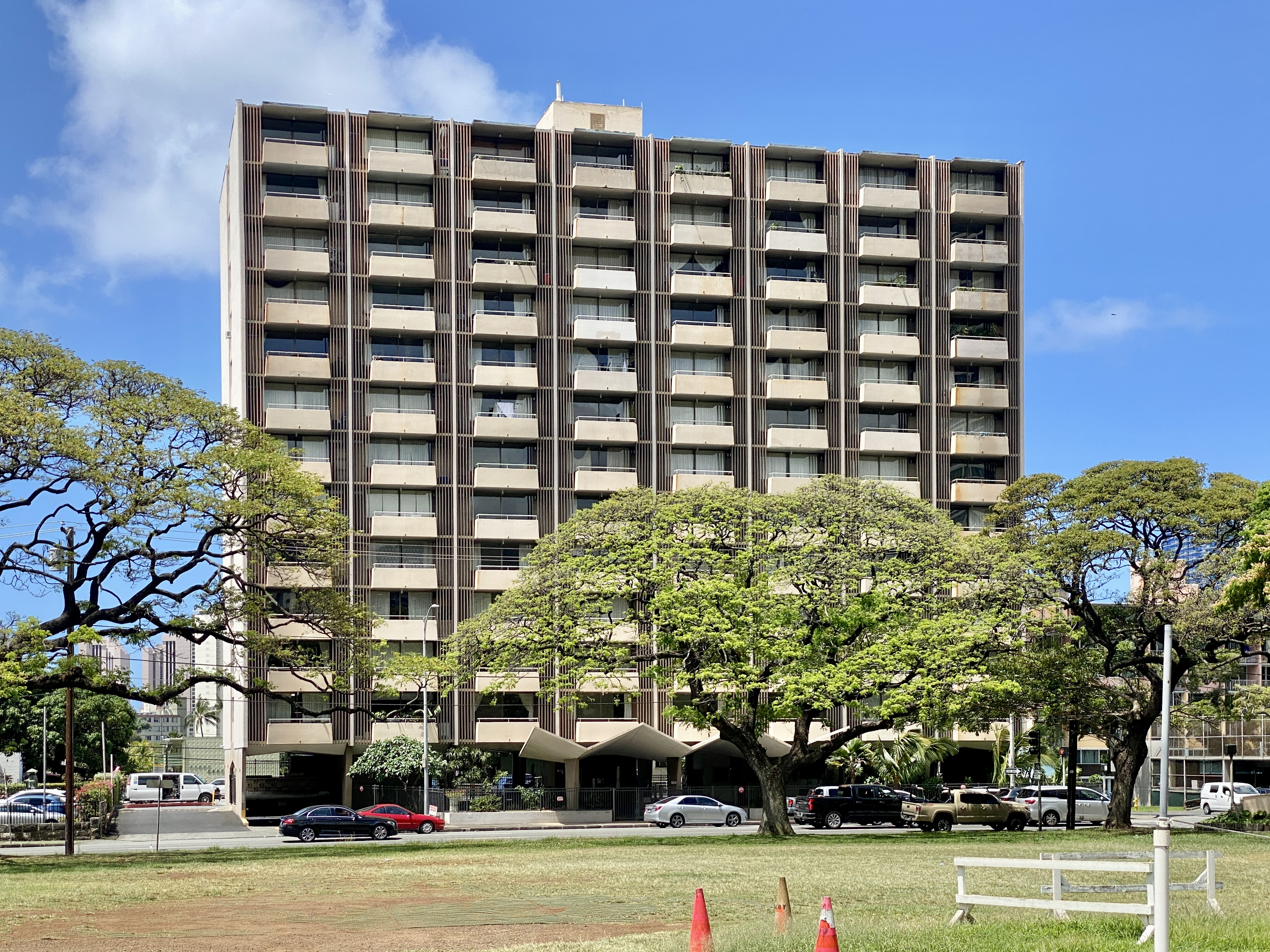
- The building on Beretania Street

General information
- Status: Completed
- Type: Apartment building
- Location: 1617 South Beretania Street; Makiki, Honolulu, Hawaii
- Coordinates: 21.2984°N 157.8351°W
- Construction started: 1964
- Completed: 1965
- Owner: MW Group (since 2026)

Technical details
- Floor count: 12

Design and construction
- Known for: Childhood home of Barack Obama

Other information
- Number of units: 96

Punahou Circle apartments is a 12-story, 96-unit apartment building at 1617 South Beretania Street in the Makiki neighborhood of Honolulu, Hawaii. Completed in 1965, it is best known as one of Barack Obama's childhood homes. Obama lived there with his maternal grandparents, Stanley and Madelyn Dunham, from 1971 until he graduated high school. In 2009 state legislators proposed nominating it to the National Register of Historic Places, an effort that did not result in a listing.

== History & design ==
The apartment building is located at 1617 South Beretania St in Honolulu's Makiki neighborhood. The building is cinderblock, 12 stories tall and was constructed in the 1960s. It contains 96 units (24 studios, 48 one-bedrooms, and 24 two-bedrooms). It was constructed in 1965.

=== Dunham family residence ===
During Barack Obama's childhood, he lived in multiple homes in Hawaii. In 1971, he and his grandparents moved into Apartment 1206 in Punahou Circle and, in 1973, moved into a two-bedroom unit, Apartment 1008. After Obama graduated from the Punahou School in 1979, his grandmother Madelyn Dunham continued living in the unit until her death in 2008.

Upon Obama's campaign for president in 2008, the apartment became a tourist destination and was regularly visited by tour buses. This was, in part, because the building was the first childhood home of a president to be a high-rise rental unit. It also became a target for vandalism, with several items from the building's lobby being stolen or destroyed after Obama visited the building shortly before the election.

=== 2025–2026 sale of building ===
In 2025 the building was listed for sale, with the sales listing highlighting that most units rented for below market value. The sale was completed in October 2026, with the building selling for $18 million.

== Historic designation effort ==
In 2009, Renton Nip, the owner of the apartment building, announced that the company was considering an effort to place the building on the National Register of Historic Places. The effort was taken up by the Hawaii State Legislature, who debated legislation supporting the process later that year. The resolution was introduced by Tom Brower. This was criticized by the Hawaii Republican Party, whose spokesperson said "there are more pressing things we have to focus on." The legislation was not acted on that year and was still pending in 2010. By 2015, the effort was considered a failure. Beginning in 2017, state senator Stanley Chang introduced bills directing the government to place historical markers at sites associated with Obama, which included Punahou Circle.
