= Stanley Dunham =

Stanley Dunham may refer to:

- Stanley Armour Dunham (1918–1992), grandfather of Barack Obama
- Stanley Ann Dunham (1942–1995), mother of Barack Obama
