= Charles T. Payne =

American World War II soldier (1925–2014)

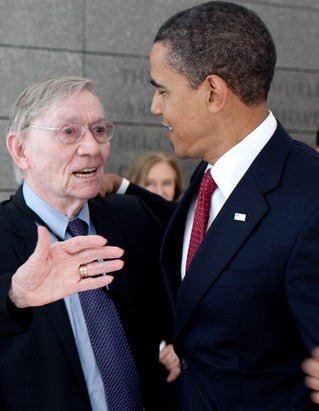
- Payne greets his grandnephew President Barack Obama in Colleville-sur-Mer, France, on the 65th anniversary of D-Day.
- Born: Charles Thomas Payne; February 16, 1925; Peru, Kansas, U.S.
- Died: August 1, 2014 (aged 89); Chicago, Illinois, U.S.
- Spouse: Melanie Payne
- Relatives: Madelyn Lee Payne (sister); Ann Dunham (niece); Barack Obama (grandnephew); Maya Soetoro-Ng (grandniece)
- Military career
- Allegiance: United States
- Branch: United States Army
- Service years: 1943–1945
- Rank: Private
- Unit: 89th Infantry Division
- Known for: Maternal granduncle of U.S. president Barack Obama
- Conflicts: World War II
- Other work: University of Chicago Library

Charles Thomas Payne (February 16, 1925 – August 1, 2014) was an American librarian and soldier. A member of the Obama family, he was the brother of Madelyn Payne Dunham and granduncle of former U.S. president Barack Obama.

During World War II, Payne served as a member of the U.S. Army's 89th Infantry Division that liberated Ohrdruf, a sub-camp of the Buchenwald concentration camp.

His military service was often mentioned in Obama's speeches, including the one given in 2009 commemorating the anniversary of D-Day. During the 2008 presidential election, there was brief media attention when Obama mistakenly identified the camp he helped liberate as Auschwitz instead of Ohrdruf. In 2009, Payne spoke about this experience:

Ohrdruf was in that string of towns going across, south of Gotha and Erfurt. Our division was the first one in there. When we arrived there were no German soldiers anywhere around that I knew about. There was no fighting against the Germans, no camp guards. The whole area was overrun by people from the camp dressed in the most pitiful rags, and most of them were in a bad state of starvation.

After the war, Payne earned a degree in chemical engineering from Kansas State University and worked as an engineer before pursuing studies at the University of Chicago's Graduate Library School. At the university, he shared a dormitory and developed a longtime friendship with Lien Chan, the future vice president and premier of Taiwan.

Payne joined the staff of the University of Chicago Library in 1964, serving as the assistant director from 1975 to 1992. Meanwhile, Obama taught constitutional law at the university's law school from 1992 to 2004. Payne attended the 2008 Democratic National Convention, where his grandnephew was nominated for president.

Payne died on August 1, 2014, aged 89.

== See also ==
- List of topics related to Barack Obama § Family members
