= Dreams from My Father =

Book by Barack Obama

Dreams from My Father: A Story of Race and Inheritance
- Author: Barack Obama
- Language: English
- Subject: Early life of Barack Obama
- Genre: Memoir
- Publisher: Times Books (1995); Three Rivers Press (2004)
- Publication date: July 18, 1995; August 10, 2004
- Publication place: United States
- Media type: Book
- Pages: 403 (1995); 442 (2004)
- ISBN: 1-4000-8277-3
- Dewey Decimal: 973/.0405967625009/0092 B 22
- LC Class: E185.97.O23 A3 2004

Dreams from My Father: A Story of Race and Inheritance is a 1995 memoir by Barack Obama that explores the events of his early years in Honolulu and Chicago until his entry into Harvard Law School in 1988. Obama originally published his memoir in 1995, when he was starting his political campaign for the Illinois Senate.

After Obama won the U.S. Senate Democratic primary victory in Illinois in 2004, the book was re-published that year. He gave the keynote address at the 2004 Democratic National Convention (DNC) and won the US Senate seat in the fall. Obama launched his presidential campaign three years later. The 2004 edition includes a new preface by Obama and his DNC keynote address.

According to The New York Times, Obama modeled Dreams from My Father on Ralph Ellison's novel Invisible Man. The book, frequently praised for its literary qualities, has also been criticized for inaccuracies and over-use of artistic license. Obama acknowledges using composite characterizations and adjusted timelines in the book's introduction, writing that the "hazards" of autobiography could not be fully avoided.

== Narrative ==
=== Childhood ===
Barack Obama recounts how his parents met and his own life until his enrollment at Harvard Law School in 1988. His parents were Barack Obama Sr. of Kenya, and Ann Dunham of Wichita, Kansas, who had met while they were students at the University of Hawaii. In the first chapter, speaking of his father and namesake, Obama states "[h]e had left Hawaii back in 1963, when I was only two years old." Obama's parents separated in 1963 and divorced in 1964, when he was two years old. The elder Obama later went to Harvard to pursue his PhD in economics. After that, he returned to Kenya to fulfill the promise to his nation. Obama himself formed an image of his absent father from stories told by his mother and maternal grandparents. He saw his father one more time, in 1971, when Obama Sr. came to Hawaii for a month's visit. The elder Obama, who had remarried, died in a car accident in Kenya in 1982.

After her divorce, Ann Dunham married Lolo Soetoro, a Javanese surveyor from Indonesia who was also a graduate student in Hawaii. The family moved to Jakarta when Obama was six years old. At age ten, Obama returned to Hawaii under the care of his maternal grandparents for the better educational opportunities available there. He was enrolled in the fifth grade at Punahou School, a private college-preparatory school, where he was one of six black students. Obama attended Punahou from the fifth grade until his graduation in 1979. Obama writes in his book: "For my grandparents, my admission into Punahou Academy heralded the start of something grand, an elevation in the family status that they took great pains to let everyone know." There, he met Ray (Keith Kakugawa), who was two years older and also multi-racial. He introduced Obama to the African-American community.

=== Adulthood ===
Upon graduating from high school, Obama moved to the contiguous United States for studies at Occidental College. He describes having lived a "party" lifestyle of drug and alcohol use. After two years at Occidental, Obama transferred to Columbia College at Columbia University, where he majored in Political Science. After graduation, Obama worked for a year in business. He moved to Chicago, where he worked for a non-profit as a community organizer in the Altgeld Gardens housing project on the city's mostly black South Side. Obama recounts the difficulty of the experience, as his program faced resistance from entrenched community leaders and apathy on the part of the established bureaucracy. During this period, Obama first visited Chicago's Trinity United Church of Christ, which became the center of his religious life. Before attending Harvard, Obama decided to visit relatives in Kenya for the first time in his life. He recounts part of this experience in the final and emotional part of the book. Obama acknowledged his entire memoir to reflect on his personal experiences with race relations in the United States.

== Reception ==
A contemporary review in the New York Times was mostly complimentary. The reviewer, novelist Paul Watkins, wrote that Obama "persuasively describes the phenomenon of belonging to two different worlds, and thus belonging to neither." However, Watkins questioned whether Obama's narrative suggested that people of mixed backgrounds must choose only one culture, which seemed at odds with America's diverse nature, writing "[i]f this is indeed true, as Mr. Obama tells it, then the idea of America taking pride in itself as a nation derived of many different races seems strangely mocked."

After Obama achieved greater national prominence in 2007, Dreams found renewed critical attention. Speaking in 2008, Toni Morrison, a Nobel Laureate novelist, has called Obama "a writer in my high esteem" and the book "quite extraordinary". She praised

his ability to reflect on this extraordinary mesh of experiences that he has had, some familiar and some not, and to really meditate on that the way he does, and to set up scenes in narrative structure, dialogue, conversation—all of these things that you don't often see, obviously, in the routine political memoir biography. ... It's unique. It's his. There are no other ones like that.

In an interview for The Daily Beast, author Philip Roth said he had read Dreams from My Father "with great interests", and commented that he had found it "well done and very persuasive and memorable." The book "may be the best-written memoir ever produced by an American politician", wrote Time columnist Joe Klein. In 2008, The Guardian's Rob Woodard wrote that Dreams from My Father "is easily the most honest, daring, and ambitious volume put out by a major US politician in the last 50 years." Michiko Kakutani, the Pulitzer Prize-winning critic for The New York Times, described it as "the most evocative, lyrical and candid autobiography written by a future president." Writing for the Guardian, literary critic Robert McCrum wrote that Obama had "executed an affecting personal memoir with grace and style, narrating an enthralling story with honesty, elegance and wit, as well as an instinctive gift for storytelling." McCrum had included the book in his list of the 100 best non-fiction books of all time.

In 2011, Time magazine listed the book on its top 100 non-fiction books written in English since 1923. The audiobook edition earned Obama the Grammy Award for Best Spoken Word Album in 2006. Five days before being sworn in as President in 2009, Obama secured a $500,000 advance for an abridged version of Dreams from My Father for middle-school-aged children.

=== Accuracy ===
Obama acknowledges using composite characterizations and adjusted chronology in the book's introduction, writing that the "hazards" of autobiography could not be fully avoided. As early as 2004, this drew criticism from Chicago Sun-Times columnist Lynn Sweet, who wrote that "it is impossible to tell who [in the book] is real and who is not." Noting the book's considerable number of alterations from reality, invented composite characters, and restructured timelines, scholar David Garrow described Dreams as "a work of historical fiction" in his 2017 biography of Obama, Rising Star. Sheila Miyoshi Jager, a former girlfriend of Obama's, has objected being combined with another woman into a white character, as she is half-Asian and considers herself mixed-race, like Obama.

David Remnick, another Obama biographer (The Bridge, 2010), described Dreams as "a mixture of verifiable fact, recollection, recreation, invention, and artful shaping." A number of factual inaccuracies or exaggerations in Dreams were also discussed by David Maraniss in his 2012 work Barack Obama: The Story; Maraniss describes the book as more akin to fictional literature than true autobiography.

== People in the book ==
With the exception of family members and a handful of public figures, Barack Obama says in the 2004 preface that he had changed names of others to protect their privacy. He also created composite characters to expedite the narrative flow. Some of his acquaintances have recognized themselves and acknowledged their names. Various researchers have suggested the names of other figures in the book:

Actual name	Referred to in the book as
Salim Al Nurridin	Rafiq
Margaret Bagby	Mona
Hasan Chandoo	Hasan
Earl Chew	Marcus
Frank Marshall Davis	Frank
Joella Edwards	Coretta
Pal Eldredge	Mr. Eldredge
Mabel Hefty	Miss Hefty
Loretta Augustine Herron	Angela
Emil Jones	Old Ward Boss
Keith Kakugawa	Ray
Jerry Kellman	Marty Kaufman
Yvonne Lloyd	Shirley
Ronald Loui / Terrence Loui (composite)	Frederick
Greg Orme	Scott
Johnnie Owens	Johnnie
Mike Ramos	Jeff
Sohale Siddiqi	Sadik
Wally Whaley	Smitty

== Versions ==
- New York: Times Books; 1st edition (July 18, 1995); Hardcover: 403 pages; ISBN 0-8129-2343-X
- New York: Kodansha International (August 1996); Paperback: 403 pages; ISBN 1-56836-162-9
- New York: Three Rivers Press; Reprint edition (August 10, 2004); Paperback: 480 pages; ISBN 1-4000-8277-3
- New York: Random House Audio; Abridged edition (May 3, 2005); Audio CD; ISBN 0-7393-2100-5; Includes the senator's speech from the 2004 Democratic National Convention.
- New York: Random House Audio; Abridged edition on Playaway digital audio player
- New York: Random House Large Print; 1st Large print edition (April 4, 2006); Hardcover: 720 pages; ISBN 0-7393-2576-0
- New York: Crown Publishers (January 9, 2007); Hardcover: 464 pages; ISBN 0-307-38341-5
- New York: Random House (January 9, 2007); eBook; ISBN 0-307-39412-3
- Melbourne: Text Publishing (2008); Paperback: 442 pages; ISBN 978-1-921351-43-3

Translations

- Arabic: Aḥlām min abī : qiṣṣat ʻirq wa-irth, translated by Hibah Najīb al-Sayyid Maghrabī; Īmān ʻAbd al-Ghanī Najm; Majdī ʻAbd al-Wāḥid ʻInabah, (2009), OCLC 460600393
- Bosnian: Snovi moga oca : priča o rasi i naslijeđu, Sarajevo : Buybook (2008), OCLC 488621036
- Chinese: 歐巴馬的夢想之路：以父之名 (pinyin: Ōubāmǎ de mèngxiǎng zhī lù: Yǐ fǔ zhī míng; lit. 'Obama's road of dreams: from his father'), translated by Hui-Yao Wang (Chinese: 王輝耀) and Kuan-Lan Shih (Chinese: 石冠蘭). China Times Publishing Company, Taipei, Taiwan, (2008), ISBN 978-957-13-4926-8
- Croatian: Snovi mojega oca : priča o rasi i naslijeđu, (2004), ISBN 978-953-182-079-0
- Czech: Cesta za sny mého otce : jedna z nejpůsobivějších autobiografických knih o sebepoznání a hledání vlastní identity, translated by Marie Čermáková, Praha : Štrob, Širc & Slovák, (2009), ISBN 978-80-903947-6-6
- Danish: Arven fra min far : selvbiografi, Gyldendals Bogklubber, (2009), OCLC 488375191
- Dutch: Dromen van mijn vader, translated by Joost Zwart, Atlas, (2007), ISBN 978-90-450-0089-3
- Finnish: Unelmia isältäni : kertomus rodusta ja sukuperinnöstä, translated by Seppo Raudaskoski and Mika Tiirinen, (2009), ISBN 978-951-692-723-0
- French: Les rêves de mon père, translated by Paris Presses de La Cité, Paris, France, (2008), ISBN 978-2-258-07597-9
- German: Ein amerikanischer Traum, Carl Hanser Verlag (2008), ISBN 978-3-446-23021-7
- Greek, Modern: Eikones tou patera mou : he historia henos genous kai mias klēronomias, (2008), ISBN 978-960-6689-41-3
- Hebrew: חלומות מאבי (Ḥalomot me-avi), translated by Edna Shemesh, Tel Aviv, Israel, (2008), OCLC 256955212
- Hindi: Pitā se mile sapane, translated by Aśoka Kumāra, Aravinda Kumāra Pabliśarsa, Guṛagām̐va,(2009), ISBN 978-81-8452-017-0
- Indonesian: Dreams from My father : pergulatan hidup Obama, (2009), ISBN 978-979-433-544-4
- Japanese: My Dream: An autobiography of Barack Obama (マイ・ドリーム: バラク・オバマ自伝), translated by Yuya Kiuchi, Mikiko Shirakura, (2007) ISBN 978-4-478-00362-6
- Korean: Nae abŏji robutŏ ŭi kkum (내 아버지로부터의 꿈), translated by Kyŏng-sik Yi, Random House Korea, Seoul, Korea, (2007), ISBN 978-89-255-1014-9
- Marathi: Ḍrīmsa phrôma māya phādara, translated by Yamājī Mālakara and Nītā Kulakarṇī, Ameya Prakāśana, (2009), OCLC 515543205
- Persian: Ruyāhā-ye pedaram, translated by Rītū Baḥrī, (2009), ISBN 978-964-174-082-7
- Persian: Ruyāhā-ye pidaram, translated by Manīzhih Shaykh Javādī, (2009), ISBN 978-600-5253-09-2
- Polish: Odziedziczone marzenia, translated by Piotr Szymczak, (2008), ISBN 978-83-7278-333-2
- Portuguese: A Minha Herança, translated by Artur Lopes Cardoso, Cruz Quebrada, (2008), ISBN 978-972-46-1830-2
- Portuguese: A Origem dos Meus Sonhos, translated by Irati Antonio, Renata Laureano & Sonia Augusto, (2008), ISBN 9788573125948
- Serbian: Snovi moga oca : priča o rasi i nasleđu, translated by Vesna Džuverović; Jasna Simonović, (2008),ISBN 978-86-505-1029-2
- Spanish: Los sueños de mi padre : una historia de raza y herencia, Vintage Español, New York City, New York, (2009), ISBN 978-0-307-47387-5
- Spanish: Los sueños de mi padre : una historia de raza y herencia, translated by Fernando Miranda; Evaristo Páez Rasmussen, Granada : Almed, (2008), ISBN 978-84-936685-0-1
- Swedish: Min far hade en dröm, Albert Bonniers förlag (2008), ISBN 978-91-0-011728-3
- Thai: Bārak ʻŌbāmā : phom likhit chiwit ʻēng, translated by Nopphadon Wētsawat, Krung Thēp : Samnakphim Matichon, (2008), ISBN 978-974-02-0139-7
- Turkish: Babamdan hayaller : [ırk ve kimlik mirasının öyküsü], İstanbul : Pegasus Yayınlar (2008), ISBN 978-605-5943-32-5
- Urdu: Obāmā kī āp bītī, translated by Yāsar Javvād, (2009), OCLC 421024762
- Vietnamese: Những giấc mơ từ cha tôi, translated by Quang Nguyễn, (2008), OCLC 317713059
