= Madelyn Dunham =

Maternal grandmother of Barack Obama (1922–2008)

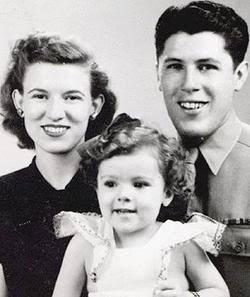
- Dunham (left) with her daughter, Ann Dunham and her husband, Stanley Armour Dunham, mid-1940s
- Born: Madelyn Lee Payne; October 26, 1922; Peru, Kansas, U.S.
- Died: November 2, 2008 (aged 86); Honolulu, Hawaii, U.S.
- Resting place: Pacific Ocean off Koko Head, Oahu, Hawaii, U.S.
- Other name: "Toot"
- Education: University of Washington
- Occupation: Vice President at the Bank of Hawaii
- Known for: Maternal grandmother of Barack Obama
- Spouse: Stanley Armour Dunham (m. 1940; died 1992)
- Children: Stanley Ann Dunham
- Relatives: Charles Thomas Payne (brother); Barack Obama (grandson); Maya Soetoro-Ng (granddaughter)

Madelyn Lee Payne Dunham (/ˈdʌnəm/ DUN-əm; October 26, 1922 – November 2, 2008) was an American banker and the maternal grandmother of Barack Obama, the 44th President of the United States. She and her husband Stanley Armour Dunham raised Obama from age ten in their Honolulu apartment. She died on November 2, 2008, two days before her grandson was elected president.

== Early life ==
Madelyn Dunham, born Madelyn Lee Payne on October 26, 1922, in Peru, Kansas, was the eldest of four children of Rolla Charles "R.C." Payne and Leona Belle (McCurry) Payne. In Barack Obama's memoir, Dreams From My Father, he describes his great-grandparents as "stern Methodist parents who did not believe in drinking, playing cards, or dancing." Dunham moved with her parents to Augusta, Kansas at the age of three. She was an honor roll student and one of the best students at Augusta High School, where she graduated in 1940. Despite her strict upbringing, she liked to go to Wichita, Kansas to see big band concerts. While in Wichita, she met Stanley Dunham from El Dorado, Kansas, and the two married on May 5, 1940, the night of Madelyn's senior prom.

== Adult life ==
=== World War II ===
During World War II, Madelyn Dunham worked the night shift on a Boeing B-29 assembly line in Wichita and Stanley Dunham enlisted in the Army. Her brother Charlie Payne was part of the 89th Infantry Division, which liberated the Nazi concentration camp at Ohrdruf, a subcamp of Buchenwald, a fact Barack Obama has referred to in speeches. Madelyn Dunham gave birth to their only child, a daughter named Stanley Ann Dunham, who was later known as Ann, at St. Francis Hospital in Wichita on November 29, 1942.

=== Post-World War II ===
With Madelyn and Stanley Dunham both working full-time, the family moved to Berkeley, California, Ponca City, Oklahoma, Vernon, Texas, El Dorado, Kansas, Seattle, Washington and settled in Mercer Island, Washington, where Ann Dunham graduated from Mercer Island High School. In El Dorado, Madelyn Dunham worked in restaurants and Stanley Dunham had managed a furniture store. In Seattle, she eventually became vice-president of a local bank and Stanley Dunham worked in a bigger furniture store (Standard-Grunbaum Furniture). Mercer Island was then "a rural, idyllic place", quiet, politically conservative and all white. Madelyn and Stanley Dunham attended church at the East Shore Unitarian Church in Bellevue. While in Washington, Madelyn Dunham attended the University of Washington although she never completed a degree.

=== Hawaii ===
The Dunhams then moved to Honolulu, Hawaii, where Madelyn Dunham started working at the Bank of Hawaii in 1960 and was promoted to be one of the bank's first female vice presidents in 1970, while Stanley Dunham worked at a furniture store. In 1970s Honolulu, both women and the minority white population were routinely the target of discrimination.

Ann Dunham attended the University of Hawaii, and while attending a Russian language class, she met Barack Obama Sr. in 1960, a graduate student from Kenya. Stanley and Madelyn Dunham were unhappy about their daughter's marriage to Obama Sr. in 1961, particularly after receiving a long, angry letter from his father, who "didn't want the Obama blood sullied by a white woman". The Dunhams adapted, but Madelyn Dunham was quoted as saying, "I am a little dubious of the things that people from foreign countries tell me". In 1961, Barack Obama was born to Ann and Barack Obama Sr. They divorced in 1963 and Ann Dunham married Lolo Soetoro from Indonesia.

Madelyn and Stanley Dunham raised their grandson, Barack Obama from age 10 while his mother and step-father were living in Jakarta, Indonesia, so he could go to school in Hawaii. In fifth grade, Obama was enrolled at the Punahou School, a prestigious preparatory school where his tuition fees were paid with the aid of scholarships. Ann Dunham later came back to Hawaii to pursue graduate studies, but when she returned to Indonesia in 1977 for her master's fieldwork, Obama stayed in the United States with his grandparents. Obama wrote in his memoir Dreams From My Father: "I'd arrived at an unspoken pact with my grandparents: I could live with them and they'd leave me alone so long as I kept my trouble out of sight".

Obama and his half-sister, Maya Soetoro referred to Dunham as "Toot"—short for "tutu", the Hawaiian word for grandmother. In his book, Obama described Dunham as "quiet yet firm", in contrast to his "boisterous" grandfather. Obama considered his grandmother "a trailblazer of sorts, the first woman vice-president of a local bank". Her colleagues recall her as a "tough boss" who would make you "sink or swim", but who had a "soft spot for those willing to work hard". She retired from the Bank of Hawaii in 1986.

During an interview for Vanity Fair, Obama said, "She was the opposite of a dreamer, at least by the time I knew her. ... Whether that was always the case or whether she scaled back her dreams as time went on and learned to deal with certain disappointments is not entirely clear. But she was just a very tough, sensible, no-nonsense person". During his teenage years, it was his grandmother who "injected" into him "a lot of that very midwestern, sort of traditional sense of prudence and hard work", even though "some of those values didn't sort of manifest themselves until I got older".

Obama said about her during an interview with Diane Sawyer, "She never got a college education but is one of the smartest people I know. ... She's where I get my practical streak. That part of me that's hardheaded, I get from her. She's tough as nails". Obama said his iconic image of his grandmother was seeing her come home from work and trading her business outfit and girdle for a muumuu, some slippers and a drink and a cigarette.

== Later years ==
Dunham took care of her daughter in Hawaii in the months before Ann Dunham died in 1995 at age 52.

Until her death, Madelyn Dunham lived in the same small high-rise apartment where she raised her grandson, Barack Obama. She was an avid bridge player, but mostly stayed at home in her apartment "listening to books on tape and watching her grandson on CNN every day". Dunham developed severe osteoporosis and, in 2008, she underwent both corneal transplant and hip replacement surgeries.

=== 2008 presidential campaign ===
Dunham was generally not seen in the 2008 presidential campaign. In March 2008, at age 85, she was quoted as saying, "I am not giving any interviews...I am in poor health".

On March 18, 2008, in a speech on race relations in Philadelphia in the wake of controversial videos of Obama's pastor Jeremiah Wright surfacing, Obama described his grandmother:

I can no more disown him than I can my white grandmother – a woman who helped raise me, a woman who sacrificed again and again for me, a woman who loves me as much as she loves anything in this world, but a woman who once confessed her fear of black men who passed by her on the street, and who on more than one occasion has uttered racial or ethnic stereotypes that made me cringe.

On March 20, 2008, in a radio interview on Philadelphia's WIP, Obama explained this remark by saying:

The point I was making was not that my grandmother harbors any racial animosity – she doesn't. But she is a typical white person, who, if she sees somebody on the street that she doesn't know...there's a reaction that's been bred into our experiences that don't go away and that sometimes come out in the wrong way, and that's just the nature of race in our society.

Obama's use of the phrase "typical white person" was highlighted by a columnist for the Philadelphia Daily News and subsequently picked up by commentators on other media outlets. In a CNN interview, when Larry King asked him to clarify the "typical white person" remark, Obama said:

Well, what I meant really was that some of the fears of street crime and some of the stereotypes that go along with that were responses that I think many people feel. She's not extraordinary in that regard. She is somebody that I love as much as anybody. I mean, she has literally helped to raise me. But those are fears that are embedded in our culture, and embedded in our society, and even within our own families, even within a family like mine that is diverse.

One of Dunham's co-workers for over 40 years said he "never heard her say anything like that. I never heard her say anything negative about anything". Hawaiian State Senator Sam Slom, who worked with her at the Bank of Hawaii, said "I never heard Madelyn say anything disparaging about people of African ancestry or Asian ancestry or anybody's ancestry". Her brother, Charlie Payne, told the Associated Press that his sister's reaction to being made a campaign issue was "no more than just sort of raised eyebrows".

In April 2008, Madelyn Dunham appeared briefly in her first campaign ad for her grandson, saying that Obama had "a lot of depth, and a broadness of view".

In a September 10, 2008, interview on Late Show with David Letterman, Obama described his grandmother as follows:

Eighty-seven [sic] years old. She can't travel. She has terrible osteoporosis so she can't fly, but, you know, she has been the rock of our family and she is sharp as a tack. I mean, she's just – she follows everything, but she has a very subdued, sort of Midwestern attitude about these things. So when I got nominated, she called and said, "That's nice, Barry, that's nice".

On October 20, 2008, the Obama campaign announced that he would suspend campaign events on October 23 and 24 to spend some time with Dunham. His communications director told reporters that she had fallen ill in the preceding weeks, and that while she was released from the hospital the week before, her health had deteriorated "to the point where her situation is very serious". In an October 23, 2008, interview with CBS News, Obama said, "She has really been the rock of the family, the foundation of the family. Whatever strength, discipline – that – that I have – it comes from her".

=== Death ===
Dunham died at her home on November 2, 2008, at the age of 86. The Obama campaign said that she "died peacefully after a battle with cancer" in Hawaii. Obama and his sister Maya Soetoro released a statement saying, "She was the cornerstone of our family, and a woman of extraordinary accomplishment, strength, and humility". At a rally in Charlotte, North Carolina on November 3, Obama said, "She was one of those quiet heroes that we have all across America. They're not famous. Their names are not in the newspapers, but each and every day they work hard. They aren't seeking the limelight. All they try to do is just do the right thing". Dunham's absentee ballot, received by the election office on October 27, was included in Hawaii's total. On December 23, 2008, after a private memorial service at the First Unitarian Church of Honolulu, then President-elect Obama and his sister scattered their grandmother's ashes in the ocean at Lanai Lookout. It was the same spot where they had scattered their mother's ashes in 1995.

== Ancestry ==
Madelyn Payne Dunham's heritage consists mostly of English ancestors, and smaller amounts of Scottish, Welsh, Irish, and German ancestors, who settled in the American colonies during the 17th and 18th centuries. Her most recent native European ancestor was her great-great grandfather, Robert Perry, who was born in Anglesey, Wales in 1786 and whose father, Henry Perry, first settled Radnor, Ohio in 1803. Robert Perry's wife, Sarah Hoskins, was also born in Wales and immigrated to Delaware County, Ohio as a young child.

According to the family's oral tradition, her mother had some Cherokee ancestors, although researchers have found no concrete evidence of this as of 2008.
