= Alice Dewey =

American anthropologist (1928-2017)

- Born: Alice Greeley Dewey; December 4, 1928; Wichita, Kansas, U.S.
- Died: June 11, 2017 (aged 88); Honolulu, Hawaii, U.S.
- Relatives: John Dewey (grandfather)

Academic background
- Education: Radcliffe College (BA, MA, PhD)
- Thesis: Modjokuto Study: The Market (1959)

Academic work
- Discipline: Anthropology
- Institutions: University of Hawaiʻi at Mānoa
- Doctoral students: Ann Dunham

Alice Greeley Dewey (December 4, 1928 – June 11, 2017) was an American anthropologist who studied Javanese society. She was a professor of anthropology at the University of Hawaiʻi at Mānoa from 1962 until her retirement in 2005. Among her doctoral students was Ann Dunham, the mother of President Barack Obama.

== Biography ==
Dewey was born in 1928 to Sabino L. Dewey and Edith Elizabeth Greeley. Her father was born in Italy as Sabino Piro Levis and was adopted as a child by the philosopher John Dewey and his wife Alice. She grew up in Huntington, New York, and during high school worked at the laboratory now known as Cold Spring Harbor Laboratory.

Dewey attended Radcliffe College of Harvard University, where she became interested in cultural anthropology. After completing her Bachelor of Arts degree in 1950, she continued her study of anthropology at Radcliffe, earning her Master of Arts degree in 1955 and her Doctor of Philosophy in 1959.

She conducted field research in east central Java, Indonesia from 1952 to 1954, joining in the Modjokuto Project with Harvard University Ph.D. candidates Clifford Geertz, Hildred Geertz, Robert Jay, Donald Fagg, and Edward Ryan. Members of the research team studied different aspects of contemporary social life in the town of Pare, East Java, known pseudonymously in their publications as Modjokuto. Dewey's research subject was rural markets, and her dissertation was published as a monograph in 1962 under the title Peasant Marketing in Java.

Dewey joined the faculty of the University of Hawaiʻi at Mānoa Department of Anthropology in 1962. She served as the dissertation adviser for many doctoral students, most notably Barack Obama's mother Ann Dunham, who entered the graduate program in 1972 after having lived in Indonesia with her second husband Lolo Soetoro for five years. Dunham's application to the program caught the attention of Dewey because of her experience in Indonesia and her interest in the production of handicrafts there. Dunham completed coursework for her M.A. in anthropology in 1974, and the following year returned to Indonesia for her dissertation fieldwork on peasant blacksmithing in Yogyakarta. Dunham was formally granted her M.A. in 1986 and her Ph.D. in 1992, under Dewey's supervision. After Dunham's death in 1995, Dewey and Nancy I. Cooper edited her dissertation for publication, which appeared in 2009 as Surviving Against the Odds: Village Industry in Indonesia. Scholar Niara Sudarkasa noted that Dewey was helpful in her preparation to do fieldwork in the early 1960s.

In addition to her fieldwork in Java, Dewey also studied the Māori people of New Zealand and the Javanese community in New Caledonia. She retired in 2005. She died on June 11, 2017, in Honolulu after suffering a stroke.
