= Sheila Miyoshi Jager =

American historian (born 1963)

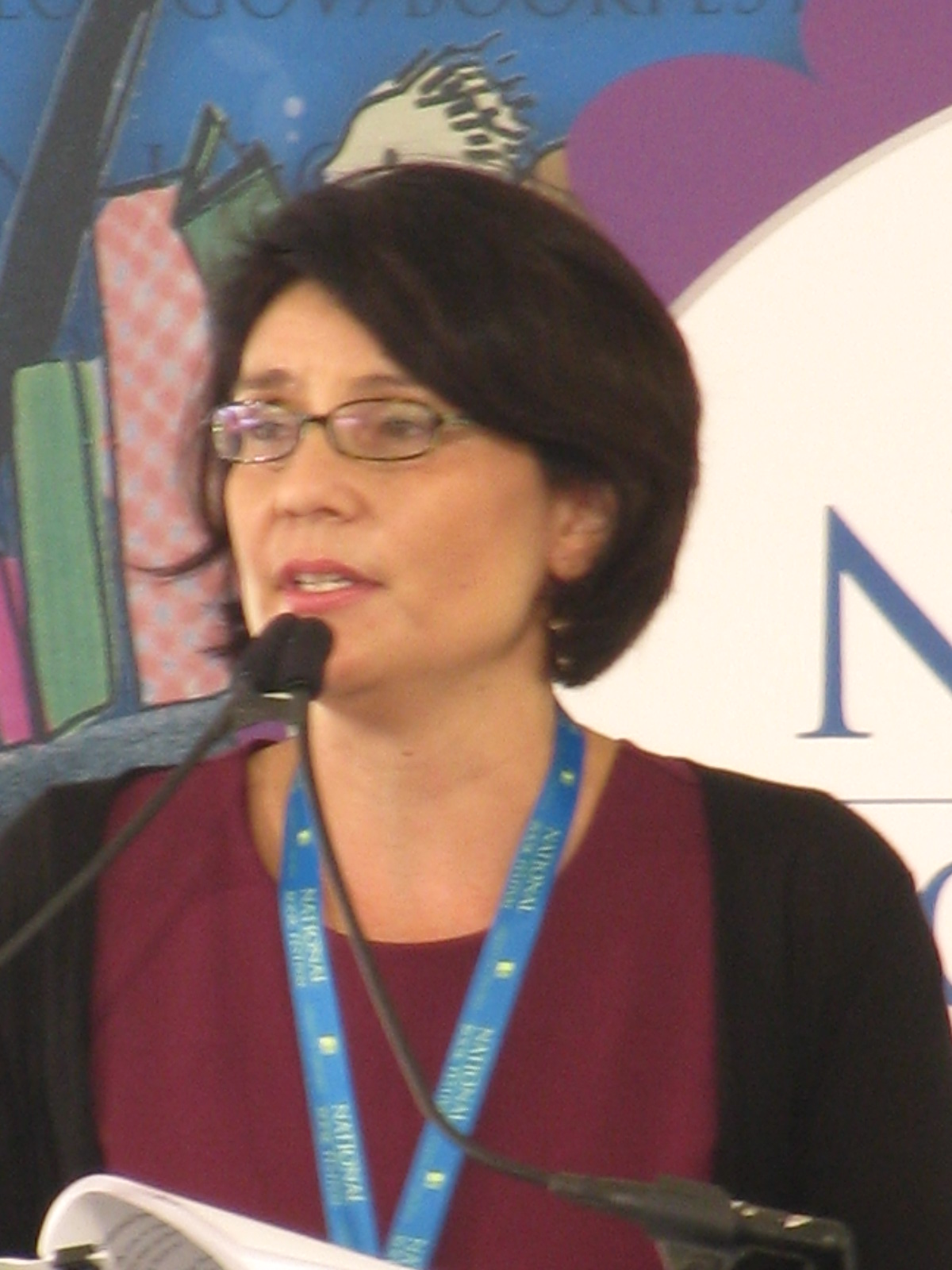
- Jager speaking at the 2013 National Book Festival
- Born: 1963 (age 62–63)
- Education: Bennington College; Middlebury College; University of Chicago
- Occupation: Historian
- Employer: Oberlin College
- Spouse: Jiyul Kim
- Children: 4

Sheila Miyoshi Jager (born 1963) is an American historian. She is a Professor of East Asian Studies at Oberlin College, author of two books on Korea, co-editor of a third book on Asian nations in the post-Cold War era, and a forthcoming book on great power competition in northeast Asia at the turn of the 19th-20th century. She is a well-known historian of Korea and East Asia.

== Early life ==
Sheila Miyoshi Jager was born in 1963. She is of Dutch and Japanese ancestry. She graduated from Bennington College with a Bachelor of Arts degree in 1984. She earned a Master of Arts degree from Middlebury College in 1985, and a PhD in anthropology from the University of Chicago in 1994.

== Career ==
Jager is a Professor of East Asian Studies at Oberlin College. She is the author of several books about East Asian history.

Her first book, Narratives of Nation Building in Korea: A Genealogy of Patriotism, was published in 2003. In it, Jager analyzes Korea through the axes of history, gender, and nationalism, by using both theory and data. She looks at male identity through the figures of Shin Chaeho and Yi Gwangsu between 1910 and 1945 in the first part; the female body as a metonymy for the Korean body politic in the second part; and the leaders of South Korea (Park Chung Hee, Chun Doo-hwan, Roh Tae-woo) and North Korea (Kim Il Sung) in the third part. In a review for The Journal of Asian Studies, Roy Richard Grinker, a Professor of Anthropology at George Washington University, called it "a coherent, well-argued, and well-researched study of Korea nationalism", but he deplored, "This book is not long, yet the scope is so extensive that it demands more detailed and wide-ranging analyses that might complicate her arguments." He also criticized her use of Korean literature as reductive. In a review for Pacific Affairs, Chiho Sawada also criticized the book for being too short (only 140 pages), but he added that it was "an excellent text for courses on not only Korea but postcolonial histories and national/gender identities." In a review for the Bulletin of the School of Oriental and African Studies, University of London, Swiss academic Martina Deuchler called it "a sophisticated and well-written study," although she warned "the book is not an easy read." A Korean translation was published by Namu yŏnp'il (도서출판 나무연필) in November 2023.

Her second book, Ruptured Histories: War, Memory and the Post-Cold War in Asia, co-edited with Rana Mitter, was published in 2007. It is a collection of essays by various scholars about the state of Asia since the end of the Cold War. In a review for The China Quarterly, Parks M. Coble, a professor of history at the University of Nebraska–Lincoln, concludes that, contrary to Europe, there is no common thread between the Asian nations analyzed in this volume. Nevertheless, in Pacific Affairs, Associate Professor Kerry Smith of Brown University suggests reading the entire book from cover to cover, not just certain chapters relevant to one's personal interests in specific nations. Reviewing it for The Journal of Asian Studies, Erik Harms, an Associate Professor of Anthropology at Yale University (then at Duke University), described it as "an insightful collection of expertly researched and theoretically informed case studies from Japan, Korea, China, Taiwan, and Vietnam." He also noted, "We see how apparently local developments emerge within broader international, regional, and global contexts." In The Journal of Japanese Studies, Christopher Goto-Jones of Leiden University highlights Mitter and Jager's "attempt to wrestle the question of war memory away from its near exclusive focus on the singular rupture represented by Japan's defeat in 1945"; instead, they attempt to show how "the continuously shifting international environment impacts the formation (and utility) of national (and transnational and subnational) narratives."

Her third book, Brothers at War: The Unending Conflict in Korea, was published in 2013 simultaneously by Profile Books in the UK and Norton in the U.S. It was a selection for the 2013 National Book Festival and featured in a C-Span Book TV After Words interview. The book covered the history of the Korean peninsula from its liberation in 1945 to 2012, portraying the confrontation between the two Koreas as a competition for legitimacy. The Economist called it the "most balanced and comprehensive account of the Korean War." Mark Atwood's review for the New York Times remarked it as "superb...elegant and balanced" while Eliot Cohen, reviewing for The Wall Street Journal, wrote "Brothers at War does an exceptionally good job of bringing the conflict to life." In a review for Foreign Affairs, Andrew J. Nathan, a Professor of Political Science at Columbia University, who thought the book was a "magisterial history of the Korean War," noted that Jager suggested atrocities were committed not only by the North Korean Army, but also by the South Korean Army and the United States Army during the Korean War, a conflict which formally ended in 1953 but has never been fully resolved. She also suggested that North Korea may have to become a province of China to survive economically. Brothers at War was chosen as one of three Best International Relations Books of the Year in the Asia and the Pacific category by Foreign Affairs. A Dutch translation was published in 2020 by Omniboek under the title Broederstrijd in Korea: Het oneindige conflict tussen Noord en Zuid.

Her fourth book, The Other Great Game: The Opening of Korea and the Birth of Modern East Asia was published in May 2023 by The Belknap Press of Harvard University Press. The publisher described it as "A dramatic new telling of the dawn of modern East Asia, placing Korea at the center of a transformed world order wrought by imperial greed and devastating wars." The book received the 2024 Robert L. Jervis and Paul W. Schroeder Best Book Award in international history and politics from the American Political Science Association (APSA). It was described as an "epic tour de force [that] elucidates the decades long struggle between regional powers China, Russia, and Japan in their rivalries with each other, illustrating how their respective, competing bids to dominate the Korean peninsula was at the epicenter of that competition." APSA further noted that it was "international political history at its best. Integrating finely detailed analyses of the Sino-Japanese War of 1894-1895, the Russo-Chinese War of 1900, and the Russo-Japanese War of 1904-1905 with an uncommon sensitivity to the political and social currents within all four of these societies, The Other Great Game illustrates the crucial roles of both situationally distinct contexts and the influence of general pressures and motivations, combining the savvy of a regional expert and the analytical rigor of a specialist in international relations." The book also won the 2024 Duke of Wellington Medal for Military History. The medal is awarded annually by the Royal United Services Institute (RUSI) for the best English-language writing on military history. Professor Michael Clarke, the head of the panel of judges, stated, "The Other Great Game: The Opening of Korea and the Birth of Modern East Asia is a work of true scholarship, both for its sources, inaccessible to most of us, and the way it puts a generally neglected area of study into the conventional picture of imperial history that shaped East Asia towards the region as we know it today."

In addition to academic articles, she has written op-eds, columns, and book reviews for The New York Times, Boston Globe, Politico Magazine, and The New York Times Sunday Book Review.

She has advised and appeared in two documentaries on the Korean War, The Battle of Chosin (WGBH/PBS, 2016) and Korea: The Neverending War (PBS/BBC/ARTE, 2019).

== Personal life ==
Jager's Dutch paternal grandparents, Hendrik and Geesje Jager, were recognized as Righteous Among the Nations by Yad Vashem in 1996. The Yad Vashem online entry reads,

"In order to avoid deportation, the parents of seven-year-old Margaretha Celine (Greetje) de Haas (later Gosschalk) handed her over in August 1943 to a nurse who was active in a nurses’ Resistance group. The Resistance group was connected with an underground movement in the province of Groningen, and Hendrik Jager was one of the people who traveled to Amsterdam to maintain contact between the two groups. Hendrik’s main task was to find families willing to hide Jewish children. He would wait at the train station in Groningen and then escort the children either to the address he had found or, temporarily, to his home until a permanent place could be located. Since he had not found a family who would take her, Hendrik decided to take Greetje in himself and she stayed with him and his wife, Geesje, for three years. Hendrik and Geesje lived in Hoogezand, Groningen, and had two sons, Henk and Bernd, who regarded Greetje as a sister. The family never received any payment for looking after her...Hendrik found hiding places for approximately 50 Jewish children all around the province. After the war, the Jagers applied to become Greetje’s guardians, but in 1946, close friends of her parents were awarded custody. Although they were not related, Greetjeand called her guardians 'uncle' and 'aunt,' and the Jagers remained close, even after she got married and immigrated to the United States...The Jagers kept in touch with her husband, Eddy, and their son and daughter after Greetje’s untimely death in 1971. On October 10, 1996, Yad Vashem recognized Hendrik Jager and his wife, Geesje Jager-ten Brinke, as Righteous Among the Nations."

In the 1980s, Jager lived with Barack Obama, then a community organizer in Chicago. In winter 1986, Obama asked her parents if he could marry her, but they objected. Shortly after he entered the Harvard Law School, Obama proposed to Jager a second time, but she rejected him. Their relationship was only made public in May 2017, several months after the end of Obama's two-term presidency, in David Garrow's Rising Star: The Making of Barack Obama. Notably, David Garrow admitted that he had never seen Obama's letters to Sheila Miyoshi Jager.

Jager is married to Jiyul Kim, a retired U.S. Army veteran and a history instructor at Oberlin College. They have four children and reside in Ohio.

== Fellowships, grants, visiting positions, and honors ==
- 2020 Smith Richardson International Security & Foreign Policy grant (The Other Great Game: The Opening of Korea and the Birth of Modern East Asia book project)
- 2016-17 Member, Advisory Board to the Hyundai Motor-Korea Foundation Center for Korean History and Public Policy, Wilson Center, Washington DC (resigned in protest of Charles K. Armstrong's membership on the same board and continued association with the Wilson Center despite his misconduct for source fabrication and plagiarism.)
- 2014-15 Fulbright Senior Scholar Fellowship (Seoul)
- 2013 Library of Congress National Book Festival, Washington, DC
- 2006-08 Visiting Research Professor of National Security, Strategic Studies Institute, U.S. Army War College, Carlisle, PA
- 1998-99 American Council of Learned Societies/Social Science Research Council (ACLS/SSRC) International Postdoctoral fellowship (Seoul)
- 1988 Fulbright-Hays Doctoral Dissertation Research Abroad fellowship (South Korea)

== Works ==
- Jager, Sheila Miyoshi (2003). Narratives of Nation Building in Korea: A Genealogy of Patriotism. Armonk, New York: M.E. Sharpe. ISBN 9780765610676. OCLC 50554438.
- Jager, Sheila Miyoshi; Mitter, Rana, eds. (2007). Ruptured Histories: War, Memory and the Post-Cold War in Asia. Cambridge, Massachusetts: Harvard University Press. ISBN 9780674024700. OCLC 71369523.
- Jager, Sheila Miyoshi (2013). Brothers At War: The Unending Conflict in Korea. London, U.K.: Profile Books. ISBN 9781847652027. OCLC 854973556.
- Jager, Sheila Miyoshi (2013). Brothers at War: The Unending Conflict in Korea. New York, New York: W.W. Norton. ISBN 978039334885-9. OCLC 835951628.
- Jager, Sheila Miyoshi; NARRATOR: Chung, Jackie (2013). Brothers at War: The Unending Conflict in Korea (Audiobook). Audible. ASIN B00FTV4LN2.
- Jager, Sheila Miyoshi (2014). Brothers at War: The Unending Conflict in Korea (Revised ed.). New York, New York: W. W. Norton. ISBN 978-0393348859. OCLC 881705877.
- Jager, Sheila Miyoshi (2015). Narratives of Nation Building in Korea: A Genealogy of Patriotism. London: Routledge. ISBN 9781317464112. OCLC 957646469.
- Jager, Sheila Miyoshi (2020). Broederstrijd in Korea: Het oneindige conflict tussen Noord en Zuid [Fraternal War in Korea: The Never-Ending Conflict Between North and South] (in Dutch). Translated by Posthuma, Roelof. Utrecht, Netherlands: Omniboek. ISBN 9789401916677. OCLC 1175598096.
- Jager, Sheila Miyoshi (2023). The Other Great Game: The Opening of Korea and the Birth of Modern East Asia. Cambridge, Massachusetts: The Belknap Press of Harvard University Press. ISBN 9780674983397. OCLC 1346349192.
- Jager, Sheila Miyoshi; NARRATOR: Li, Kathleen (2023). The Other Great Game : The Opening of Korea and the Birth of Modern East Asia (Audiobook). Old Saybrook, CT: Tantor Audio. ISBN 9798350823332. OCLC 1405916672.
- Jager, Sheila Miyoshi (2023). Chung, Hŭi-chin (ed.). 애국의 계보학: 대한민국의 정체성을 만든 서사들 [Genealogy of Patriotism: Narratives of South Korean Identity] (in Korean). Translated by Cho, Ko-ŭn. Seoul: 나무연필 (Namu yŏnp'il). ISBN 9791187890522.
