= Obama Mama =

- Produced by: Brian Woods
- Release date: 2014
- Country: United States
- Language: English

Obama Mama is a 2014 biographic documentary film about Ann Dunham by producer/director Vivian Norris. It was co-produced with Brian Woods. The film was a featured selection at the 2014 Seattle International Film Festival (SIFF), where it premiered in May, 2014 at the Kirkland Performance Center in Kirkland, Washington. Tom Tangney of the Broadcast Film Critics Association listed it as one of his ten "best bests" for SIFF.
