= Bearing the Cross =

1986 book by David J. Garrow

Bearing the Cross: Martin Luther King, Jr., and the Southern Christian Leadership Conference
- Author: David J. Garrow
- Language: English
- Genre: Biography
- Publisher: William Morrow & Company
- Publication date: 1986
- Publication place: United States
- Media type: Print (hardback)
- Awards: Pulitzer Prize for Biography; Robert F. Kennedy Book Award
- ISBN: 9780688047948

Bearing the Cross: Martin Luther King, Jr., and the Southern Christian Leadership Conference is a 1986 book by David J. Garrow about Martin Luther King Jr., the Southern Christian Leadership Conference, the Freedom Rides, The March on Washington and the American Civil Rights Movement. The content of this book is derived from more than 700 recorded conversations – with such close associates of King as Coretta Scott King, Andrew Young, and Ralph D. Abernathy, as well as with political opponents – and thousands of previously unreleased FBI documents.

The book won the 1987 Pulitzer Prize for Biography and the Robert F. Kennedy Book Award.

Bearing the Cross was first published in hardback by William Morrow and Company, with a HarperCollins paperback in 2004.
