= Spark M. Matsunaga Institute for Peace and Conflict Resolution =

The Spark M. Matsunaga Institute for Peace and Conflict Resolution, usually known simply as the Matsunaga Institute, is a multi-disciplinary community of scholars, students and practitioners who, through academic programs and outreach, promote cross-cultural understanding and collaborative problem-solving. The institute emphasizes critical thinking and collaboration to groom leaders to address contemporary and complex issues in Hawaii, the Asia-Pacific region and the world.

== History ==
Originally founded in 1986 as the University of Hawai'i Institute for Peace, the institute was renamed to honor the memory of the former U.S. Senator Spark Matsunaga after his death in 1990. The institute is dedicated to implementing Senator Matsunaga's hope that "every student enrolled in Hawai'i's public university system will be exposed to peace studies". Peace education and Conflict resolution are major components of the institute's academic programs.
