= Sandra Navidi =

German lawyer

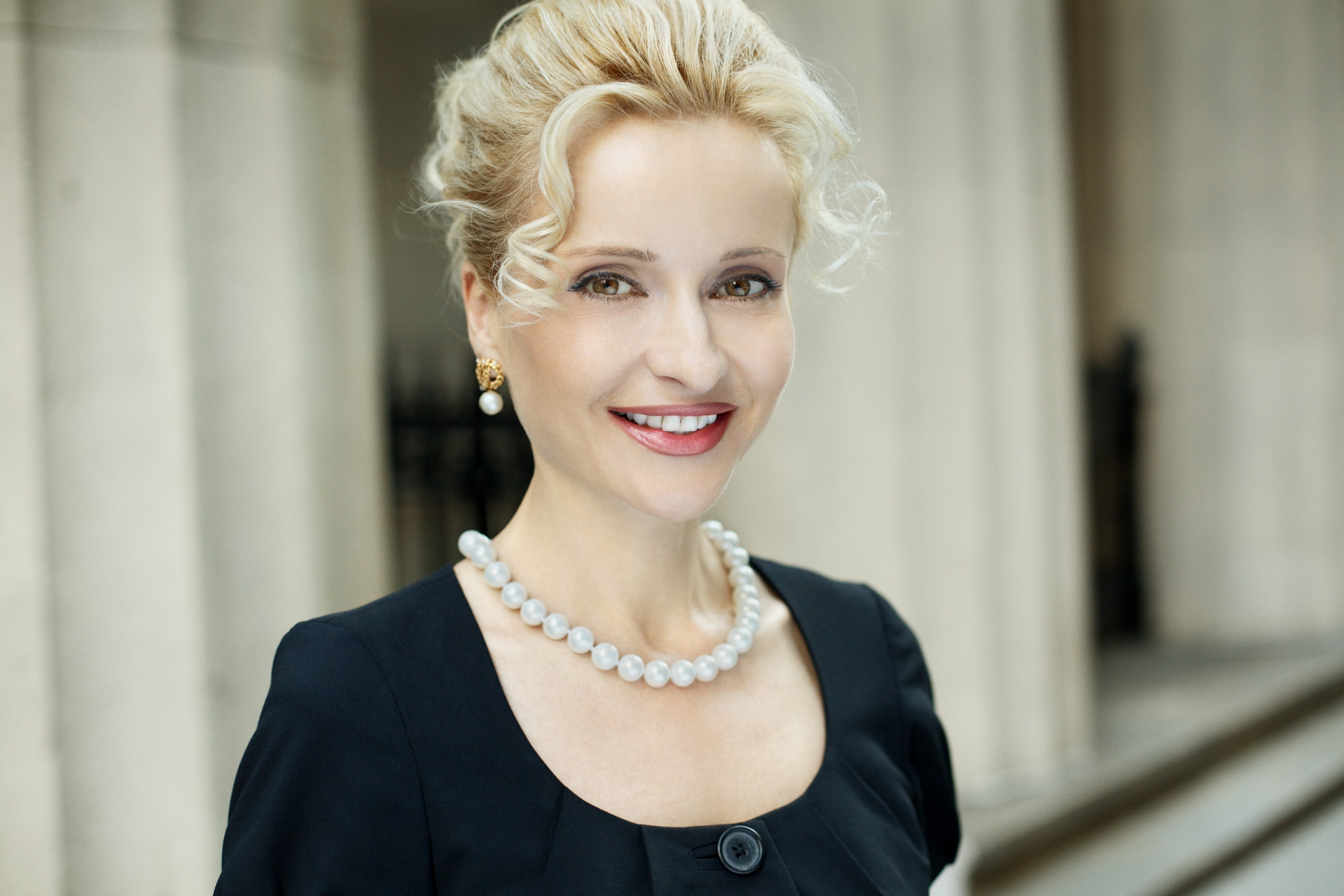
- Navidi in 2011
- Born: September 1, 1972 (age 54); Mönchengladbach, Germany
- Education: University of Cologne; Fordham University School of Law; Paris-Sorbonne University
- Occupations: U.S. and German attorney; strategic and macroeconomics advisor; keynote speaker and panelist
- Years active: 1999–present

Sandra Navidi (born September 1, 1972) is a German attorney, author, consultant, media contributor and public speaker.

== Early life and education ==
Navidi was born in Mönchengladbach, Germany, to an Iranian father and a German mother. She graduated from the University of Cologne School of Law in Germany with a law degree, and from Fordham University School of Law in New York with a Master-of-Law Degree in Banking, Corporate, and Finance Law.

== Career ==
Navidi is a macroeconomic consultant. She is the founder and chief executive officer of BeyondGlobal, an international management consultancy.

Initially she worked at New York University and at advisory firm Roubini Global Economics as director of research strategies. Prior to that, Navidi had held positions as investment banker at Scarsdale Equities, general counsel at Muzinich & Co. and consultant at Deloitte. She is admitted to the practice of law in New York State and in Germany and serves as Counsel to the international law firm Urban Thier & Federer.

She works for n-tv and Spreeradio as financial expert (RTL). In May 2019 she started a weekly column in the German tabloid newspaper Bild about economics and finance.

== Works ==
- Navidi, Sandra; Roubini, Nouriel (2017). Superhubs: How the Financial Elite and their Networks Rule Our World. Nicholas Brealey. ISBN 978-1-85788-664-1.
- Navidi, Sandra; Das Future Proof Mindset : Wie Sie im Zeitalter der Digitalisierung zukunftssicher werden. FinanzBuch Verlag, München 2021

== Awards ==
- One of Bloomberg's Best Books of the Year 2016
- Silver Medal, Axiom Business Book Awards 2018
- Intermedia-globe Silver award at World Media Festival in Hamburg for the documentary film „Wie tickt Amerika", 2019
