= OpenTheBooks =

American nonprofit government watchdog organization

Open the Books
- Founded: 2011
- Founder: Adam Andrzejewski
- Type: 501(c)(3)
- Purpose: Transparency in government
- Location: Burr Ridge, Illinois
- Region served: United States
- Website: openthebooks.com

OpenTheBooks.com is an American nonprofit organization based in the Chicago suburb of Burr Ridge, Illinois. It describes itself as a transparency group devoted to posting online all the disclosed spending of every level of government across the United States. Their oversight reports on government spending have been featured on multiple news outlets including C-SPAN's hour-long Q&A program with Brian Lamb, ABC Good Morning America, Fox News, The Wall Street Journal, Forbes, and USA Today.

== History ==
OpenTheBooks.com was founded in 2011 by its chief executive officer Adam Andrzejewski, an Illinois entrepreneur and past Republican candidate for governor, with former United States Senator Dr. Tom Coburn as the honorary chairman. In 2006, legislation co-sponsored by then-senator Barack Obama (D) and then-senator Tom Coburn (R) — the Federal Funding Accountability and Transparency Act of 2006 — was passed to allow public access to United States Federal Government spending.

In 2013, OpenTheBooks sued then-Illinois Comptroller Judy Baar Topinka (R) for all disclosed state checkbook transactions. The comptroller had rejected the group's Freedom of Information Act request calling it an 'undue burden.' After public backlash the Comptroller ultimately released the data from fiscal year 2005 forward in 2014.

In 2014, OpenTheBooks became the first and only organization to publish all disclosed federal spending including salaries, contracts, grants, direct payments, and farm subsidies. The organization also created a Mobile App which provides access to all the data collected and was recognized on the editorial page of The Wall Street Journal. In 2015, state checkbook spending was added to both the website and mobile app. Between 2015 and 2017, the group has published 11 oversight reports on federal agency spending.

== Data capture ==
The mission of OpenTheBooks is to collect and post all disclosed government spending at every level across America. In an article published at Forbes in 2016, the group claimed to have successfully captured $80 out of every $100 spent. In a speech at the Manhattan Institute for Policy Research in New York City, OpentheBooks CEO Adam Andrzejewski described the data capture as 15 million public employee salaries, 48 of 50 state checkbooks, and nearly all disclosed federal spending since 2000.

== Oversight reports ==
OpenTheBooks has completed multiple financial reports on different government agencies and programs. Notably, the organization has helped to uncover what it considers to be fraudulence and wasteful spending at the United States Department of Veterans Affairs. Other transparency impacts include: farm subsidies in New York City, Chicago, and Washington, D.C.; $24.2 billion in failed lending at the Small Business Administration; quantified $1.2 trillion in federal payments to the top 100 of the Fortune 500; found $92 million in high-end furniture purchases by the United States Environmental Protection Agency;Export–Import Bank of the United States; quantified $4.5 billion in federal agency spending on public relations; found $1.5 billion spent by non-military federal agencies outside the Department of Defense on guns, ammunition and military-style equipment; quantified federal payments of nearly $27 billion into America's Sanctuary Cities; and found $42 billion in federal subsidies, tax-breaks and payments flowed into the eight Ivy League colleges.

=== State and federal government gender hiring gap ===
In October 2017, OpenTheBooks published a gender study of highly compensated public employees in 2016 titled State & Federal Government's Gender Hiring Gap. Findings included: Rep. Nancy Pelosi pays men $124,000 and women $94,000 on her own payrolls; New York City, Mayor Bill de Blasio's payroll shows only three women among the 200 top-paid city employees; Chicago Mayor Rahm Emanuel's payroll shows just 12 women among the 100 top-paid employees; and among the most highly compensated employees at the federal level, male employees outnumber female employees at a 2-to-1 ratio.

=== National Foundation on the Arts and Humanities ===
In their oversight report, published in July 2017, titled National Foundation on the Arts and Humanities OpenTheBooks uncovered $441.1 million granted by the National Foundation on the Arts and Humanities (NFA-H) to 3,163 entities in 2016. OpenTheBooks showed that $80 out of every $100 goes to asset-rich organizations with more than $1 million each. They also found that through the NFA-H, taxpayers funded a project in Tucson, Arizona, where visitors sit or stand with a saguaro cactus for an hour.

=== Ivy League, Inc. ===
In their oversight report, published in March 2017, titled Ivy League, Inc., OpenTheBooks uncovered $41 billion taxpayer subsidies, tax-breaks and federal payments into the Ivy League colleges (FY2010–2015). One of the case studies showed that Columbia University received $5.7 million from the National Science Foundation for 'Climate Change Games' – a website called Future Coast that displays voicemails from 50 years in the future after the world has been destroyed by climate change.

=== Federal funding of sanctuary cities ===
After President Donald Trump issued his executive order threatening to cut federal funding into America's "sanctuary cities", it was unclear how much money was at stake. One week later, OpenTheBooks published an oversight report titled "Federal Funding of America's Sanctuary Cities" to answer that question: $27 billion (FY2016).

=== Truth in Lending, the U.S. Small Business Administration's $24.2 Billion Bad Loan Portfolio ===
Their oversight report, published in September 2016, titled Truth in Lending, The U.S. Small Business Administration's $24.2 Billion Bad Loan Portfolio, OpenTheBooks revealed private country clubs, golf, tennis, swim, and beach clubs across America receiving SBA loans. They found the $24.2 billion bad loan portfolio at the SBA (2000-2015) is larger than the annual budgets of 26 states. Some examples include $142 million into ZIP 90210 – Los Angeles, California (2014) – and $9.4 billion to Wall Street.

=== The Militarization of America ===
In July 2015, OpenTheBooks released an oversight report titled The Militarization of America. OpenTheBooks CEO Adam Andrzejewski and former-U.S. Senator Dr. Tom Coburn co-authored an editorial at The Wall Street Journal titled "Why Does the IRS Need Guns" to break the report. In the report, OpenTheBooks quantified $1.48 billion in non-military federal agencies purchases of guns, ammunition, and military-style equipment (FY 2006–2014). In October 2017, OpenTheBooks updated its data to include gun and ammo purchases over fiscal year 2015 and a partial FY2016. They quantified $158 million spent on guns and ammo at 58 non-military federal agencies – including 40 regulatory, administrative agencies.

=== $4.5 billion in federal "PR" spending ===
In December 2015, OpenTheBooks released an oversight report titled The Department of Self-Promotion Federal Public Relations (PR). They quantified $4.3 billion in federal public affairs salaries and bonuses and outside PR contractor spending from FY2007–FY2014. OpenTheBooks found 5,000 federal public affairs officers; $2 billion in 'PR' contracts; and advertising agencies charging up to $88/hour for their interns.

=== Veterans Affairs oversight report ===
As the initial scandal at the Veterans broke in 2014, reporters at USA Today utilized OpenTheBooks data on VA officials salaries since 2007 to provide accurate numbers in uncovering ill-gotten bonuses in the troubled facilities. This reporting helped create the environment that forced VA Secretary Eric Shinseky to rescind the $9,345 bonus of embattled Director of the Phoenix VA Health Care System Sharon Helman. On June 10, 2014, the U.S. House of Representatives voted 426-00 to end the practice of VA bonuses.

In their oversight report, published in May 2016, titled The VA Scandal Two Years Later Open the Books uncovered $20 million spent on costly artwork during a period of time in which over 1,000 veterans died while waiting for doctor appointments. The work in this report was used by multiple news sources including Good Morning America, The Hill, Reason Magazine, Real Clear Politics and was even featured on ABC World News Tonight.

In August 2016, U.S. Senator Charles Grassley (Iowa), Senate Judiciary Chairman, wrote an oversight letter using data from OpenTheBooks to the Secretary of Veteran Affairs, Robert McDonald demanding to know who authorized the art work, how much was budgeted for artwork, what was actually spent on artwork, and what, if any, rules were violated. By late August, Secretary McDonald responded with an apology and instituted new rules: "We acknowledge the poor decision making regarding art work purchases... The VA's new policy on the Acquisition of Artwork and Decorative items was published Department wide on August 18, 2016. This includes cost thresholds and approval levels for purchases..."

=== Farm subsidies in America's urban areas ===
In December 2013, OpenTheBooks published a Federal Transfer Report titled Farm Subsidies & The Big Dogs. They studied three urban areas where there are few farms: New York City, Chicago and Washington, D.C., and found they were awash in federal farm subsidies. One example was Reverend Louis Farrakhan banking $317,000 in farm subsidies over a sixteen-year period.

== Additional oversight ==
=== Rahm Emanuel 'Pay-to-Play' with Chicago City Vendors ===
In March 2015, OpenTheBooks fact checked Emanuel's ethics policy for the John Stossel Special, Chicago Corruption: Is Pay-to-Play in Chicago Still Legal? They found 600 vendors gave $7 million in campaign cash and received $2 billion in city payments after establishing an executive order prohibiting the practice.

=== Illinois is in Trouble ===
In July 2017, OpenTheBooks released an editorial on Forbes titled Why Illinois is in Trouble - 63,000 Public Employees with $100,000+ Salaries Cost Taxpayers $10B. They found, in total, roughly $12 billion in cash compensation flowing to six-figure government workers when counting the 9,031 federal employees based in Illinois.
