= Robert C. Rowland =

American academic

Robert C. Rowland is an American argumentation and rhetorical scholar. He is a professor in the Department of Communication Studies at the University of Kansas. He has published in Communication Monographs, Journal of the American Forensic Association, Quarterly Journal of Speech, and Argumentation.

Rowland was named the winner of the 2011 Douglas W. Ehninger Distinguished Rhetorical Scholar Award by the National Communication Association.

As a student at the University of Kansas Rowland, along with his partner Frank Cross, won the 1976 National Debate Tournament, defeating Georgetown University. Rowland was named the eighth outstanding speaker for the tournament.
