= Peru, Kansas =

City in Chautauqua County, Kansas

- City
- Peru City Hall in 2026. On the left is the old Odd Fellows building, built in 1894.

- Location within Chautauqua County and Kansas

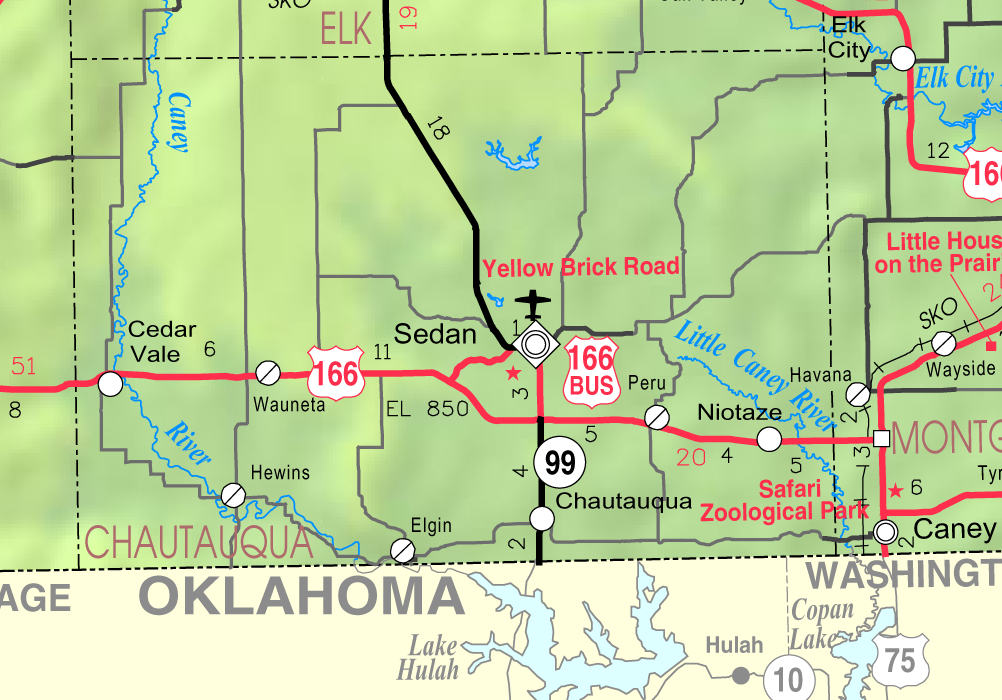
- KDOT map of Chautauqua County (legend)
- Coordinates: 37°04′49″N 96°05′46″W
- Country: United States
- State: Kansas
- County: Chautauqua
- Founded: 1870
- Incorporated: 1904
- Named for: Peru, Illinois

Area
  - Total: 0.32 sq mi (0.84 km^{2})
  - Land: 0.32 sq mi (0.84 km^{2})
  - Water: 0 sq mi (0.00 km^{2})
- Elevation: 804 ft (245 m)

Population (2020)
  - Total: 101
  - Density: 310/sq mi (120/km^{2})
- Time zone: UTC-6 (CST)
  - Summer (DST): UTC-5 (CDT)
- ZIP Code: 67360
- Area code: 620
- FIPS code: 20-55525
- GNIS ID: 2396190

Peru (/ˈpiːru/ PEE-roo) is a city in Chautauqua County, Kansas, United States. As of the 2020 census, the population of the city was 101.

== History ==
Peru was founded in 1870. It was named by E. R. Cutler, president of the town company, for his hometown of Peru, Illinois.

== Geography ==
According to the United States Census Bureau, the city has a total area of 0.32 square miles (0.83 km^{2}), all of it land.

== Demographics ==
Historical population
Census	Pop.	Note	%±
1880	135		—
1910	575		—
1920	570		−0.9%
1930	628		10.2%
1940	487		−22.5%
1950	368		−24.4%
1960	340		−7.6%
1970	289		−15.0%
1980	286		−1.0%
1990	206		−28.0%
2000	183		−11.2%
2010	139		−24.0%
2020	101		−27.3%
U.S. Decennial Census

=== 2020 census ===
The 2020 United States census counted 101 people, 39 households, and 24 families in Peru. The population density was 311.7 per square mile (120.4/km^{2}). There were 75 housing units at an average density of 231.5 per square mile (89.4/km^{2}). The racial makeup was 88.12% (89) white or European American (87.13% non-Hispanic white), 0.0% (0) black or African-American, 0.99% (1) Native American or Alaska Native, 0.0% (0) Asian, 0.0% (0) Pacific Islander or Native Hawaiian, 0.99% (1) from other races, and 9.9% (10) from two or more races. Hispanic or Latino of any race was 3.96% (4) of the population.

Of the 39 households, 20.5% had children under the age of 18; 51.3% were married couples living together; 7.7% had a female householder with no spouse or partner present. 35.9% of households consisted of individuals and 5.1% had someone living alone who was 65 years of age or older. The average household size was 1.9 and the average family size was 2.6. The percent of those with a bachelor's degree or higher was estimated to be 14.9% of the population.

17.8% of the population was under the age of 18, 6.9% from 18 to 24, 20.8% from 25 to 44, 33.7% from 45 to 64, and 20.8% who were 65 years of age or older. The median age was 52.5 years. For every 100 females, there were 77.2 males. For every 100 females ages 18 and older, there were 76.6 males.

The 2016–2020 5-year American Community Survey estimates show that the median household income was $31,731 (with a margin of error of +/- $11,776) and the median family income was $31,827 (+/- $14,782). Males had a median income of $30,729 (+/- $21,018) versus $27,750 (+/- $16,431) for females. The median income for those above 16 years old was $29,500 (+/- $13,049). Approximately, 4.7% of families and 12.9% of the population were below the poverty line, including 12.5% of those under the age of 18 and 15.9% of those ages 65 or over.

=== 2010 census ===
As of the census of 2010, there were 139 people, 67 households, and 36 families residing in the city. The population density was 434.4 inhabitants per square mile (167.7/km^{2}). There were 99 housing units at an average density of 309.4 per square mile (119.5/km^{2}). The racial makeup of the city was 82.0% White, 8.6% Native American, 0.7% from other races, and 8.6% from two or more races. Hispanic or Latino of any race were 3.6% of the population.

There were 67 households, of which 19.4% had children under the age of 18 living with them, 47.8% were married couples living together, 3.0% had a female householder with no husband present, 3.0% had a male householder with no wife present, and 46.3% were non-families. 43.3% of all households were made up of individuals, and 6% had someone living alone who was 65 years of age or older. The average household size was 2.07 and the average family size was 2.81.

The median age in the city was 49.3 years. 16.5% of residents were under the age of 18; 11.6% were between the ages of 18 and 24; 14.4% were from 25 to 44; 35.3% were from 45 to 64; and 22.3% were 65 years of age or older. The gender makeup of the city was 54.7% male and 45.3% female.

=== 2000 census ===
As of the census of 2000, there were 183 people, 87 households, and 50 families residing in the city. The population density was 485.3 inhabitants per square mile (187.4/km^{2}). There were 101 housing units at an average density of 267.9 per square mile (103.4/km^{2}). The racial makeup of the city was 92.35% White, 1.64% African American, 4.37% Native American, and 1.64% from two or more races.

There were 87 households, out of which 23.0% had children under the age of 18 living with them, 39.1% were married couples living together, 9.2% had a female householder with no husband present, and 42.5% were non-families. 40.2% of all households were made up of individuals, and 21.8% had someone living alone who was 65 years of age or older. The average household size was 2.10 and the average family size was 2.78.

In the city, the population was spread out, with 23.0% under the age of 18, 4.9% from 18 to 24, 24.6% from 25 to 44, 24.6% from 45 to 64, and 23.0% who were 65 years of age or older. The median age was 42 years. For every 100 females, there were 90.6 males. For every 100 females age 18 and over, there were 101.4 males.

The median income for a household in the city was $25,208, and the median income for a family was $31,875. Males had a median income of $15,625 versus $12,143 for females. The per capita income for the city was $13,810. About 6.4% of families and 11.9% of the population were below the poverty line, including 13.3% of those under the age of eighteen and 8.3% of those 65 or over.

== Education ==
Peru is served by Chautauqua County USD 286 public school district, and its Sedan Jr/Sr High School is located in Sedan.

Peru High School was closed through school unification. The Peru High School mascot was Trojans.

== Transportation ==
Highway U.S. Route 166 runs through Peru.

== Notable people ==
- Madelyn Dunham (1922–2008), maternal grandmother of 44th President Barack Obama, was born in Peru.
