= Maya Soetoro-Ng =

Indonesian-American academic (born 1970)

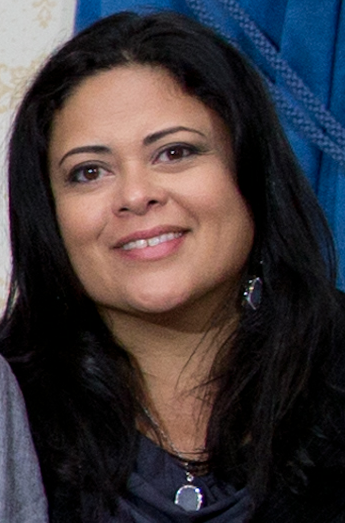
- Soetoro-Ng in 2013
- Born: Maya Kasandra Soetoro; August 15, 1970 (age 56); Jakarta, Indonesia
- Political party: Democratic
- Spouse: Konrad Ng (m. 2003)
- Children: 2
- Parents: Lolo Soetoro (father); Ann Dunham (mother)
- Relatives: Barack Obama (half-brother)

Academic background
- Education: Columbia University (BA); New York University (MA); University of Hawaii, Manoa (PhD)
- Thesis: Border Pictures: Hybrid Narratives for the Humanities Classroom (2006)
- Doctoral advisor: David Ericson

Academic work
- Discipline: Social science
- Institutions: University of Hawaiʻi at Mānoa

Maya Kasandra Soetoro-Ng (née Soetoro; /ˈmaɪ.ə suːˈtɔːroʊ ˈɪŋ/; born August 15, 1970) is an Indonesian-American academic, who is a faculty specialist at the Spark M. Matsunaga Institute for Peace and Conflict Resolution, based in the College of Social Sciences at the University of Hawaiʻi at Mānoa. She is also a consultant for the Obama Foundation, working to develop the Asia-Pacific Leaders Program. Soetoro-Ng is the maternal half-sister of Barack Obama, a former President of the United States.

== Early life and education ==
Soetoro-Ng was born in Saint Carolus Hospital, a Catholic hospital, in Jakarta, Indonesia, the daughter of American cultural anthropologist Ann Dunham (1942–1995), an American of Swiss, German, Irish, Scottish, Welsh and English descent and Indonesian businessman Lolo Soetoro (1935–1987). She had two half-brothers, Barack Obama (born 1961), former President of the United States, and Bayu Yusuf Aji Soetoro (born 1981), and a half-sister, Rahayu Nurmaida Soetoro (born 1984). She also had an adoptive sister, Holiah Soetoro (1957–2010). Soetoro-Ng has said she was named after American poet Maya Angelou.

Soetoro-Ng and Obama spent several years together in Indonesia and in Hawaii before her mother decided to return to Indonesia with her. After her parents divorced in 1980, her father remarried. From this marriage, Soetoro-Ng has another half-brother and a half-sister, who are of no relation or familial connection to Obama.

While living in Indonesia, Soetoro-Ng was home-schooled by her mother. From 1981 to 1984, Soetoro-Ng attended Jakarta International School. Like Obama, Soetoro-Ng returned to Hawaii and attended the private Punahou School in Honolulu, Hawaii, graduating in 1988. During her childhood in Jakarta, Soetoro-Ng was exposed to Indonesian languages and cultural traditions, experiences that she later cited as influential in shaping her interest in multicultural education and cross-cultural dialogue.

Soetoro-Ng received her B.A. degree from Barnard College of Columbia University. She then received an M.A. in secondary language studies and an M.A. in Secondary Education from New York University. In 2006, she received a Ph.D. in international comparative education from the University of Hawaiʻi at Mānoa.

According to The New York Times, Soetoro-Ng "has often spoken warmly about her relationship with her older brother" and their families have "often celebrated Christmas in Hawaii" together.

== Career ==
Soetoro-Ng is currently a faculty specialist for the Spark M. Matsunaga Institute for Peace and Conflict Resolution, which is based in the College of Social Sciences at the University of Hawaiʻi at Mānoa, as well as a consultant for the Obama Foundation's Leaders Program: Asia-Pacific. Dr. Soetoro-Ng teaches courses on: Peace Education; the History of Peace Movements; and Leadership for Social Change. She also oversees externships for undergraduates who are majoring or minoring in Peace Studies and coordinates the institute's community and global service learning programs.

Soetoro-Ng was an assistant professor at the Institute for Teacher Education at the University of Hawai'i College of Education and continues to do some consulting work, promoting international exchange and understanding, in partnership with the East West Center. She authored a children's book, Ladder to the Moon, that was inspired by her mother and her daughter, Suhaila; it was published in 2011. She is working on a book about peace education and a young adult novel entitled Yellowood.

Soetoro-Ng was a high school history teacher at La Pietra: Hawaii School for Girls and the Education Laboratory School, both in Honolulu, Hawaii. She previously taught and developed curriculum at The Learning Project, an alternative public middle school in New York City, from 1996 to 2000.

In 2009, Soetoro-Ng helped bring her mother's dissertation to publication in the form of the book Surviving against the Odds: Village Industry in Indonesia. She wrote a foreword to the book and participated in its launch at the American Anthropological Association annual meeting.

In 2019, Soetoro-Ng, along with Todd Shuster and Jennifer Gates cofounded The Peace Studio: a non-profit organization whose mission is to support, train and unite the next generation of artists, journalists and storytellers to inspire people everywhere to become active peacebuilders.

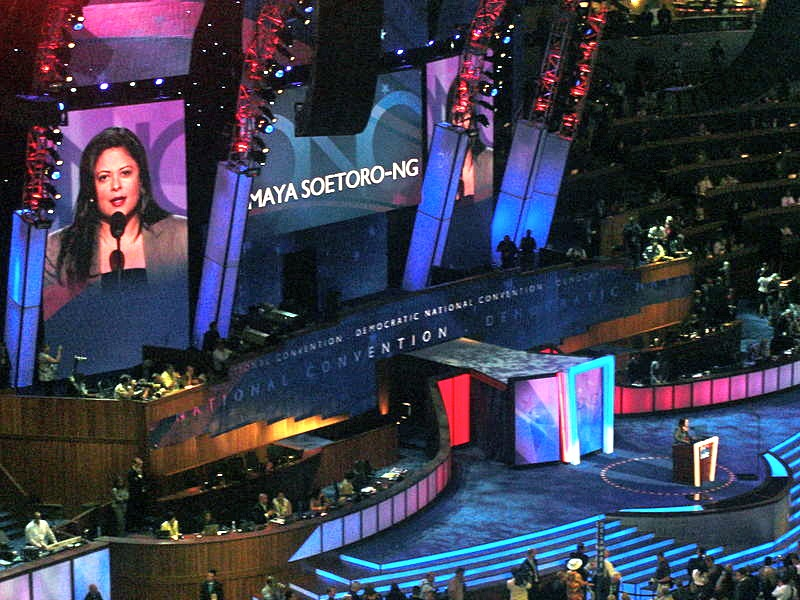
Soetoro-Ng speaking during the first day of the 2008 Democratic National Convention in Denver, Colorado.

=== Research ===
Soetoro-Ng's doctoral research at the University of Hawaiʻi at Mānoa focused on Multicultural and International Education. She examined the use of narrative to develop more complex understandings of identity in multicultural classrooms. She promoted the learning of Social Studies—history and current events—from multiple perspectives. She has developed and implemented peace education curricula in public high schools and for K-12 teachers in Colleges of Education. With partner Kerrie Urosevich, she founded the nonprofit Ceeds of Peace (ceedsofpeace.org), which connects families, community leaders and educators in a 360 degree approach to raise and educate peacebuilding leaders. With environmental law professor Maxine Burkett, she co-founded the nonprofit, Institute for Climate and Peace (www.climateandpeace.org) which works for climate justice at the intersection of climate change and positive peacebuilding.

=== Obama presidential campaigns ===
In May 2007, Soetoro-Ng announced that she would assist Obama in his campaign for presidency, and took two months off to campaign for him. She participated in the 2008 Democratic National Convention, where she spoke briefly about growing up with her brother and brought an Asian-American presence to the stage.

Soetoro-Ng also spoke briefly about the Obama administration's accomplishments at the 2012 Democratic National Convention in Charlotte, North Carolina, on September 4, 2012, sharing the podium with First Lady Michelle Obama's older brother, former Oregon State University men's basketball team head coach, Craig Robinson.

== Personal life ==
In 2003, Maya Soetoro married Konrad Ng (Simplified Chinese: 吴加儒), a Chinese Canadian from Burlington, Ontario, Canada. Ng, who is of Malaysian Chinese descent, is now also a US citizen. He was the director of the Smithsonian Asian Pacific American Center and an assistant professor at the University of Hawaii's Academy of Creative Media. He is now the executive director of the Doris Duke Shangri La Center for Islamic Arts and Culture in Hawaii in Honolulu, Hawaii. They have two daughters, Suhaila and Savita.

Soetoro-Ng has described herself as "philosophically Buddhist". She speaks Indonesian, Spanish, and English.

== See also ==
- Family of Barack Obama

== Publications ==
- Ladder to the Moon (2011) – a children's book narrated by Maya Soetoro-Ng and illustrated by Yuyi Morales. The title of the book is taken from the 1958 Georgia O'Keeffe painting, which was depicted on a postcard the author was given by her mother.
- Mixed: Portraits of Multiracial Kids by Kip Fulbeck (2010) – Soetoro-Ng is credited with writing the foreword.
