= Lolo Soetoro =

Indonesian geographer and stepfather of Barack Obama (1935–1987)

- Born: Soetoro; 2 January 1935; Bandung, West Java, Dutch East Indies
- Died: 2 March 1987 (aged 52); Jakarta, Indonesia
- Education: Gadjah Mada University (BA); University of Hawaii, Manoa (MA)
- Spouses: Ann Dunham (m. 1965; div. 1980) Erna Kustina (m. 1980)
- Children: 4, including Maya Soetoro-Ng
- Parents: Soewarno Martodihardjo (father); Djoeminah (mother)

Lolo Soetoro (Note: When he moved to the United States, he documented his name as "Lolo Soetoro" since he didn't have a typical surname.) (EYD: Lolo Sutoro; Javanese pronunciation: [ˈlɒlɒ suːˈtɒrɒː]; 2 January 1935 – 2 March 1987) was an Indonesian geographer who from 1965 to 1980 was stepfather to Barack Obama, the 44th president of the United States.

== Early life and education ==
Soetoro was born on January 2, 1935 in Bandung, in the West Java province of the Dutch East Indies (now Indonesia), as the ninth of ten children of parents, Soewarno Martodihardjo (1897–1951), an employee of a mining office from Yogyakarta, and Djoeminah (born 1900).

Soetoro's brothers were Supoyo (1919–1955), Supomo (born 1921), Sugiyo (born 1925), Bambang Sugito (born 1927), and Soemitro (born 1933), and his sisters were Cuk Muhsidi (born 1923), Titik Imam Sutiknyo (born 1929), Soewardinah (born 1931), and Uki Gunowiyono. As of 2010, all of his siblings had died.

Soetoro earned his bachelor's degree in geography from Gadjah Mada University, in Yogyakarta. In 1962, Soetoro, then a civilian employee of the Indonesian Army Topographic Service, obtained an East–West Center grant for graduate study in geography at the University of Hawaii at Manoa. He arrived in Honolulu in September 1962 and graduated from the university with a Master of Arts degree in geography in June 1964.

== Marriage to Ann Dunham ==
Soetoro met the divorced Ann Dunham at the East-West Center while both were students at the University of Hawaii, and married on 15 March 1965. Soetoro, a geographer, returned to Indonesia in 1966 to help map Western New Guinea for the Indonesian government, while Dunham and her son Barack Obama moved into her parents' house in Honolulu to complete her studies.

Dunham and her six-year-old son joined Soetoro in Jakarta in 1967. The family initially lived for two and a half years in a modest stucco and red tile house in a newly built neighborhood in Menteng Dalam village in South Jakarta and owned a new Japanese motorcycle. Dunham worked as assistant director of the Indonesia-America Friendship Institute while Obama attended the Indonesian-language Santo Fransiskus Asisi (St. Francis of Assisi) Catholic School.

In 1970, with a new job in government relations at Union Oil Company, Soetoro moved his family two miles north to a rented house, with a car replacing their motorcycle. Dunham was a department head and a director of the Lembaga Pendidikan dan Pengembangan Manajemen (LPPM)–the Institute of Management Education and Development. Obama attended the Indonesian-language Besuki School.

On 15 August 1970, Soetoro and Dunham had a daughter, Maya Kasandra Soetoro.

In mid-1971, Obama moved back to Hawaii to attend Punahou School. In August 1972, Dunham rejoined Obama with her daughter and began graduate study at the University of Hawaii at Manoa. She gained an M.A. in anthropology in December 1974 and returned with her daughter to Jakarta in 1975 while Obama remained in Hawaii. In 1976, Dunham and her daughter lived for half a year with Soetoro's 76-year-old mother.

Dunham became increasingly interested in Indonesian culture while Soetoro became more interested in that of the West, and their relationship was in conflict over differing values. They divorced on 6 November 1980.

In his 1995 memoir Dreams from My Father, Obama described Soetoro as well-mannered, even-tempered, and easy with people; he wrote of the struggles he felt Soetoro had to deal with after his return to Indonesia from Hawaii. He described his stepfather as following "a brand of Islam that could make room for the remnants of more ancient animist and Hindu faiths." In a 2007 article, Chicago Tribune foreign correspondent Kim Barker reported that Soetoro "was much more of a free spirit than a devout Muslim, according to former friends and neighbors."

== Later life ==
Soetoro married Erna Kustina in 1980 and had two children, son Bayu Yusuf Aji Soetoro (born 1981), and daughter Rahayu Nurmaida Soetoro (born 1984). He also had an adoptive daughter, Holiah Soetoro (1957–2010).

Soetoro died at Pertamina Central Hospital in Jakarta, Indonesia, on 2 March 1987 (some source reported the year as 1993), due to liver failure and secondary to unreported causes at the time of this note, at the age of 52 and is buried at Tanah Kusir Cemetery.
