= Rising Star (book) =

David Garrow's 2017 biography of Barack Obama

Rising Star: The Making of Barack Obama
- Front cover art for Rising Star: The Making of Barack Obama.
- Author: David Garrow
- Language: English
- Subject: Barack Obama
- Genre: Biography
- Published: May 9, 2017
- Publisher: William Morrow
- Publication place: United States
- Pages: 1,460
- ISBN: 978-0-06-264183-0 (hardcover)
- OCLC: 994144693

Rising Star: The Making of Barack Obama is a 2017 biography of former President of the United States Barack Obama by American author and academic David Garrow. It is Garrow's fifth book.

Additional information regarding a letter Obama sent to his first girlfriend Alex McNear was added to the paperback edition.

== Background ==
Working on the book for nine years, Garrow interviewed Obama on several occasions for the book, though much of those conversations remain off the record.

== Reception ==
The book was published by William Morrow on May 9, 2017, to mixed reviews. In The New York Times, Michiko Kakutani called the book "a dreary slog of a read: a bloated, tedious and — given its highly intemperate epilogue — ill-considered book that is in desperate need of editing, and way more exhausting than exhaustive." In Time, Sarah Begley said the book nevertheless did "contain intriguing insight into the growing pains of a 20-something who would go on to become the leader of the free world, most vividly in the form of letters he wrote to friends." The book also details an unpublished 1991 essay Obama co-wrote with law school classmate and economist Robert Fisher, in which they argue that black Americans should "shift away from rights rhetoric and towards the language of opportunity." In suggesting a lack of such opportunity, the essay mentioned businessman and future president Donald Trump:

[Americans have] a continuing normative commitment to the ideals of individual freedom and mobility, values that extend far beyond the issue of race in the American mind. The depth of this commitment may be summarily dismissed as the unfounded optimism of the average American—I may not be Donald Trump now, but just you wait; if I don't make it, my children will."

Rising Star debuted at number 14 on the New York Times bestseller list for hardcover non-fiction.
