= David Garrow =

American historian (born 1953)

- Born: David Jeffries Garrow; May 11, 1953 (age 73); New Bedford, Massachusetts, U.S.
- Education: Wesleyan University; Duke University
- Occupations: Historian, author
- Awards: Pulitzer Prize for Biography (1987)

David Jeffries Garrow (born May 11, 1953) is an American author and historian. He wrote the book Bearing the Cross: Martin Luther King, Jr., and the Southern Christian Leadership Conference (1986), which won the 1987 Pulitzer Prize for Biography. He also wrote Liberty and Sexuality (1994), a history of the legal struggles over abortion and reproductive rights in the U.S. prior to the 1973 Roe v. Wade decision, as well as Rising Star: The Making of Barack Obama (2017) and other works.

== Life and career ==
Garrow was born May 11, 1953, in New Bedford, Massachusetts, the son of Barbara (née Fassett) and Walter Garrow. He graduated from Wesleyan University in 1975 before receiving his Ph.D. from Duke University in 1981. In 1987, Garrow was a member of the Democratic Socialists of America.

Garrow writes frequently on the history of the United States Supreme Court and the history of the civil rights movement, and regularly contributes articles on these subjects to non-academic publications including The New York Times, The Nation, Financial Times, and The New Republic.

Garrow served as a senior adviser for Eyes on the Prize, the PBS television history of the civil rights movement covering the years 1954–1965. He has taught at Duke University (Instructor of History; 1978–1979), University of North Carolina at Chapel Hill (Assistant Professor of History; 1980–1984), the City College of New York and the CUNY Graduate Center (Associate and full Professor of History; 1984–1991), Cooper Union (Visiting Distinguished Professor of History; 1992–1993), the College of William & Mary (James Pinckney Harrison Visiting Professor of History; 1994–1995), American University (Distinguished Historian in Residence; 1995–1996) and the Emory University School of Law (Presidential Distinguished Professor; 1997–2005). From 2005 to 2011, Garrow was a senior research fellow at Homerton College, Cambridge. From 2011 until 2018, he served as Professor of Law and History and John E. Murray Faculty Scholar at the University of Pittsburgh School of Law.

In 2019, Garrow read Federal Bureau of Investigation (FBI) files about Martin Luther King Jr.; he wrote an article about King, in part based on his interpretation of the FBI files, which he submitted to The Atlantic, The Washington Post, The New York Times and The Guardian, all of which rejected it. The article was published in the now-defunct British conservative magazine Standpoint. Garrow wrote that the files suggest King may have encouraged and failed to prevent sexual violence and that he was reassessing his view of King.

Many authors called Garrow's claim unreliable. Garrow's reliance on a handwritten note addended to a typed report is considered poor scholarship by several authorities. Peter Ling of the University of Nottingham said that Garrow was excessively credulous in accepting the accuracy of FBI reports during a period when the FBI was undertaking a large operation to attempt to discredit King as part of its COINTELPRO activities. Experts in 20th-century American history, including Jeanne Theoharis, Barbara Ransby of the University of Illinois Chicago, N. D. B. Connolly of Johns Hopkins University and Glenda Gilmore of Yale University have expressed reservations about the quality of Garrow's scholarship. Theoharis commented "Most scholars I know would penalize graduate students for doing this." Garrow's use of intelligence sources had previously been criticized. The long-time civil rights activist Edith Lee-Payne suggested Garrow may have published his work in the area to obtain "personal attention" for himself.

Garrow was interviewed for a 2020 documentary inspired by his work, MLK/FBI.

== Selected works ==
- Protest at Selma (Yale University Press, 1978)
- The FBI and Martin Luther King, Jr. (W. W. Norton & Company, 1981)
- Bearing the Cross: Martin Luther King, Jr., and the Southern Christian Leadership Conference (William Morrow and Company, 1986)
- We Shall Overcome (as editor, three volumes of an 18-volume set, Carlson Pub., 1989)
- Liberty and Sexuality: The Right to Privacy and the Making of Roe v. Wade (Macmillan Publishers, 1994; updated paperback edition, University of California Press, 1998)
- Rising Star: The Making of Barack Obama (William Morrow and Company, 2017)
