= List of awards and honors received by Barack Obama =

Barack Obama, the 44th president of the United States, has received numerous honors in recognition of his career in politics.

Obama received the Norwegian Nobel Committee's Nobel Peace Prize in 2009, The Shoah Foundation Institute for Visual History and Education's Ambassador of Humanity Award in 2014, the John F. Kennedy Profile in Courage Award in 2017, and the Robert F. Kennedy Center for Justice and Human Rights Ripple of Hope Award in 2018. He was on TIME Magazine's Time Person of the Year in 2008 and 2012.

He also received two Grammy Awards for Best Spoken Word Album for Dreams from My Father (2006), and The Audacity of Hope (2008) as well as three Primetime Emmy Awards for Outstanding Narrator for Our Great National Parks (2022), Working: What We Do All Day (2023), and Our Oceans (2025).

== National honors ==
country	Date	Decoration
United States	January 5, 2017	Department of Defense Medal for Distinguished Public Service

== Nobel Peace Prize ==
On October 9, 2009, Obama was awarded the 2009 Nobel Peace Prize.

== Foreign honors ==
Country	Date	Decoration
Saudi Arabia	June 3, 2009	Order of King Abdulaziz (Collar)
Israel	March 21, 2013	President's Medal
Philippines	April 28, 2014	Order of Sikatuna (Grand Collar)

== Scholastic ==
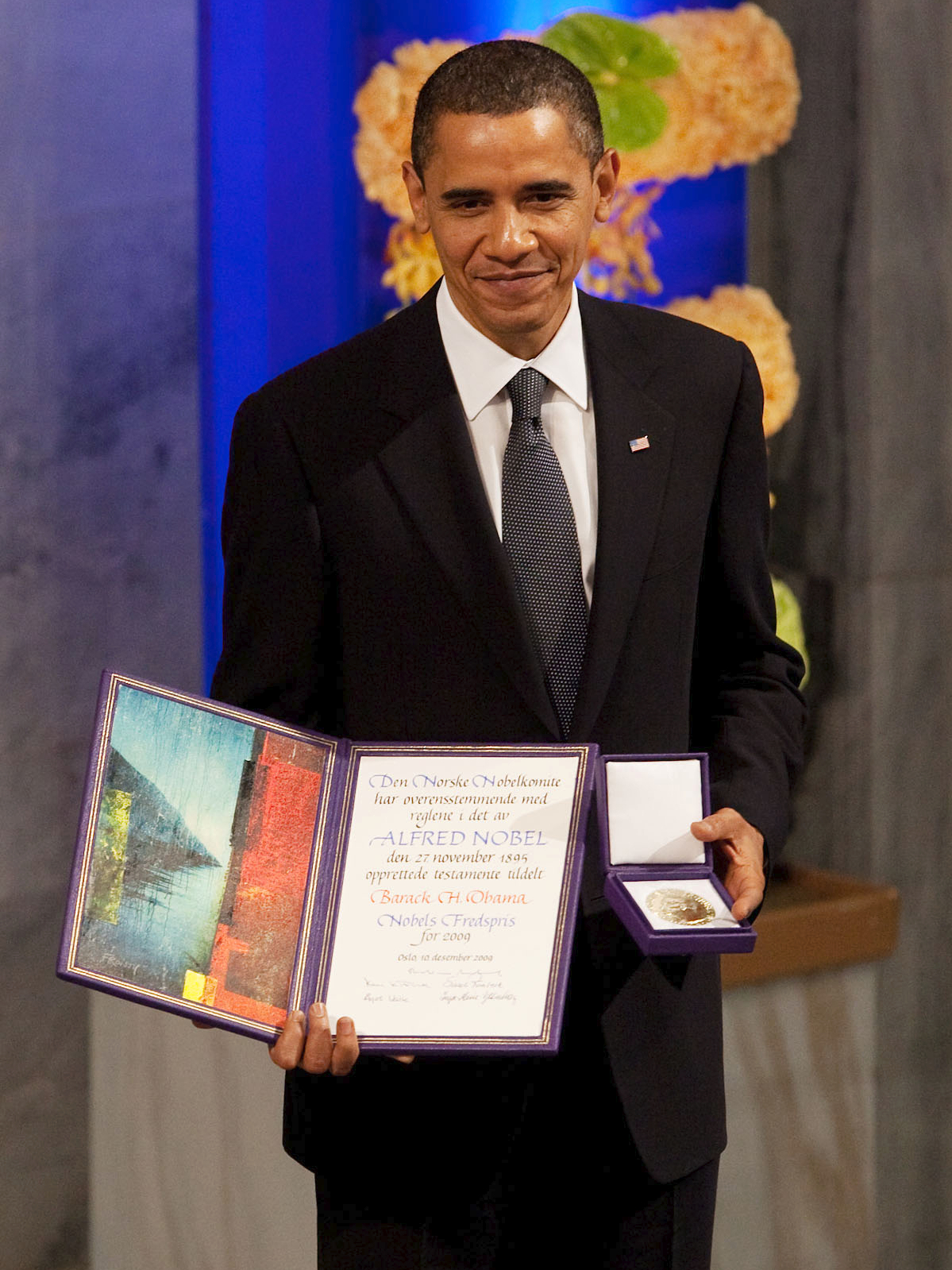
Barack Obama with the Nobel Prize medal and diploma, which he was awarded in 2009

Honorary degrees

Location	Date	School	Degree	Gave commencement address?
Illinois	June 4, 2005	Knox College	Doctor of Laws (LL.D.)	Yes
Massachusetts	June 2, 2006	University of Massachusetts Boston	Doctor of Laws (LL.D.)	Yes
Illinois	June 16, 2006	Northwestern University	Doctor of Laws (LL.D.)	Yes
Louisiana	August 13, 2006	Xavier University of Louisiana	Doctor of Laws (LL.D.)	Yes
District of Columbia	May 12, 2007	Howard University	Doctor of Laws (LL.D.)	
New Hampshire	May 19, 2007	Southern New Hampshire University	Doctor of Laws (LL.D.)	Yes
Connecticut	May 25, 2008	Wesleyan University	Doctor of Laws (LL.D.)	Yes
Indiana	May 17, 2009	University of Notre Dame	Doctor of Laws (LL.D.)	Yes
Michigan	May 1, 2010	University of Michigan	Doctor of Laws (LL.D.)	Yes
Virginia	May 9, 2010	Hampton University	Doctor of Laws (LL.D.)	Yes
Ohio	May 5, 2013	Ohio State University	Doctor of Laws (LL.D.)	Yes
Georgia (U.S. state)	May 19, 2013	Morehouse College	Doctor of Laws (LL.D.)	Yes
South Africa	June 28, 2013	University of Johannesburg	Doctor of Laws (LL.D.)	
District of Columbia	May 7, 2016	Howard University	Doctor of Science (D.Sc.)	Yes
New Jersey	May 15, 2016	Rutgers University	Doctor of Laws (LL.D.)	Yes
Hawaii	December 21, 2019	University of Hawaiʻi	Doctor of Humane Letters (D.H.L.)	
Northern Ireland	October 13, 2026	Queen's University Belfast	Honorary doctorate	

== Honorary awards ==
Year	Award	Ref.
2005	NAACP Chairman's Award	
2007	NAACP Award for Outstanding Literary Work, Nonfiction for The Audacity of Hope	
2008	Congressional Black Caucus Harold Washington Award	
2008	Congressional Black Caucus Foundation Incorporated Phoenix Award	
2008	TIME magazine's Time Person of the Year	
2009	Norwegian Nobel Committee's Nobel Peace Prize	
2011	OMB Watch/National Security Archive/Project On Government Oversight / Reporters Committee for Freedom of the Press Transparency Award	
2012	TIME magazine's Time Person of the Year	
2013	New Musical Express NME Award for Hero of the Year	
2014	The Shoah Foundation Institute for Visual History and Education's Ambassador of Humanity Award	
2015	Patient Safety Movement Foundation's Humanitarian Award	
2017	John F. Kennedy Profile in Courage Award	
2017	For Inspiration and Recognition of Science and Technology "Make It Loud" Award for FIRST / STEM Education	
2018	Robert F. Kennedy Center for Justice and Human Rights Robert F. Kennedy Ripple of Hope Award	
2021	Aisppd Onlus Medal Award at the IX International Day of Awareness and Prevention of Women Diseases Tribute to International Women's Day	

== Competitive awards ==
Association	Year	Category	Work	Result	Ref.
Children's and Family Emmy Awards	2022	Outstanding Preschool Series	Waffles + Mochi	Nominated	
Children's and Family Emmy Awards	2022	Outstanding Fiction Special	Waffles + Mochi's Holiday Feast	Nominated	
Children's and Family Emmy Awards	2022	Outstanding Preschool Animated Series	Ada Twist, Scientist	Won	
Children's and Family Emmy Awards	2022	Outstanding Short Form Program	We the People	Won	
Children's and Family Emmy Awards	2023	Outstanding Preschool Series	Waffles + Mochi's Restaurant	Nominated	
Grammy Awards	2006	Best Spoken Word Album	Dreams from My Father	Won	
Grammy Awards	2008	Best Spoken Word Album	The Audacity of Hope	Won	
Grammy Awards	2022	Best Spoken Word Album (Includes Poetry, Audio Books & Storytelling)	A Promised Land	Nominated	
News and Documentary Emmy Awards	2016	Outstanding Interview	David Attenborough Meets President Obama	Nominated	
Primetime Emmy Awards	2022	Outstanding Narrator	Our Great National Parks (episode: "A World of Wonder")	Won	
Primetime Emmy Awards	2023	Outstanding Narrator	Working: What We Do All Day (episode: "The Middle")	Won	
Primetime Emmy Awards	2025	Outstanding Narrator	Our Oceans (episode: "Indian Ocean")	Won	

- 2008: His concession speech after the New Hampshire primary was set to music by independent artists as the music video "Yes We Can", which was viewed 10 million times on YouTube in its first month and received a Daytime Emmy Award.
- February 9, 2020: Best Documentary Feature Academy Award for American Factory, made by the Obamas' production company, Higher Ground. Barack Obama was not personally among the winners of the award.

== Freedom of the City ==
- (South Africa) 2013: Cape Town. Awarded with Michelle Obama. The Award was accepted on their behalf by acting United States Ambassador Virginia Palmer.
- (Republic of Ireland) 2017: Dublin. Awarded with Michelle Obama. Barack Obama accepted the award in person during a visit in 2025.

== Namesakes ==
There are 13 community schools named after him, including: Barack & Michelle Obama Elementary School, St Paul, Minnesota; Barack Obama Charter Elementary School, Compton, California; Barack Obama Elementary School, Hempstead, New York; Barack Obama Elementary School, Richmond, Virginia; President Barack Obama School - Public School 34, Jersey City, New Jersey. Barack Obama School of International Studies (Public 6-12 IB), Pittsburgh, Pennsylvania, and Barack Obama Male Leadership Academy at A. Maceo Smith (BOMLA), magnet secondary school for boys located in the Oak Cliff area of Dallas, Texas.
