= The Audacity of Hope =

Book by Barack Obama

The Audacity of Hope: Thoughts on Reclaiming the American Dream
- Author: Barack Obama
- Language: English
- Subject: Political convictions
- Publisher: Crown / Three Rivers Press
- Publication date: October 17, 2006
- Publication place: United States
- Media type: Print (hardcover)
- Pages: 362
- ISBN: 978-0-307-23769-9
- Dewey Decimal: 973/.04960730092 B 22
- LC Class: E901.1.O23 A3 2006

The Audacity of Hope: Thoughts on Reclaiming the American Dream is the second book written by Barack Obama. It became number one on both the New York Times and Amazon.com bestsellers lists in the fall of 2006, after Obama had been endorsed by Oprah Winfrey. In the book, Obama expounds on many of the subjects that became part of his 2008 campaign for the presidency. The book advance from the publisher totalled $1.9 million contracted for three books. Obama announced his presidential campaign on February 10, 2007, a little more than three months after the book's release.

== Origin ==
The title of The Audacity of Hope was derived from a sermon delivered by Barack Obama's former pastor, Jeremiah Wright. Wright had attended a lecture by Frederick G. Sampson in Richmond, Virginia, in the late 1980s, on the G. F. Watts painting Hope, which inspired him to give a sermon in 1990 based on the subject of the painting – "with her clothes in rags, her body scarred and bruised and bleeding, her harp all but destroyed and with only one string left, she had the audacity to make music and praise God ... To take the one string you have left and to have the audacity to hope ... that's the real word God will have us hear from this passage and from Watt's painting." Having attended Wright's sermon, Obama later adapted Wright's phrase "audacity to hope" to "audacity of hope" which became the title for his 2004 Democratic National Convention keynote address, and the title of his second book.

While a Senate candidate, Obama delivered the keynote address at the 2004 Democratic Convention, entitled The Audacity of Hope that propelled him to national prominence. In the less than twenty minutes it took to deliver the speech, Obama was catapulted to sudden fame, with many analysts predicting that he might be well positioned to enter a future presidential race. In 2006, Obama released The Audacity of Hope, a book-length account that expanded upon many of the same themes he originally addressed in the convention speech.

In his speech addressing the Democratic National Convention in 2004, Obama said:

In the end, that's what this election is about. Do we participate in a politics of cynicism or a politics of hope? John Kerry calls on us to hope. John Edwards calls on us to hope. I'm not talking about blind optimism here — the almost willful ignorance that thinks unemployment will go away if we just don't talk about it, or the health care crisis will solve itself if we just ignore it. That's not what I'm talking about, I'm talking about something more substantial. It's the hope of slaves sitting around a fire singing freedom songs; the hope of immigrants setting out for distant shores; the hope of a young naval lieutenant bravely patrolling the Mekong Delta; the hope of a millworker's son who dares to defy the odds; the hope of a skinny kid with a funny name who believes that America has a place for him, too. Hope in the face of difficulty. Hope in the face of uncertainty. The audacity of hope.

== Contents ==
The book, divided into nine chapters, outlines Obama's political and spiritual beliefs, as well as his opinions on different aspects of American culture.

== Reception ==
The New York Times noted that "Mr. Obama's new book, The Audacity of Hope' ... is much more of a political document. Portions of the volume read like outtakes from a stump speech, and the bulk of it is devoted to laying out Mr. Obama's policy positions on a host of issues, from education to health care to the war in Iraq."

The Chicago Tribune describes the book as a "political biography that concentrates on the senator's core values", and credits the large crowds that gathered at book signings with influencing Obama's decision to run for president. Former presidential candidate Gary Hart describes the book as Obama's "thesis submission" for the U.S. presidency: "It presents a man of relative youth yet maturity, a wise observer of the human condition, a figure who possesses perseverance and writing skills that have flashes of grandeur." Reviewer Michael Tomasky writes that it does not contain "boldly innovative policy prescriptions that will lead the Democrats out of their wilderness", but does show Obama's potential to "construct a new politics that is progressive but grounded in civic traditions that speak to a wider range of Americans."

An Italian edition was published in April 2007 with a preface by Walter Veltroni, former Mayor of Rome, then leader of Italy's Democratic Party and one of Obama's earliest supporters overseas, who met with Obama in Washington in 2005 and has been referred to as "Obama's European counterpart". Spanish and German translations were published in June 2007; the French edition, subtitled une nouvelle conception de la politique américaine, was published in October 2007. The Croatian edition was published in October 2008.

The book remained on the New York Times Best Seller list for the 30 weeks since publication. The audiobook version won the 2008 Grammy Award for Best Spoken Word Album.

A number of blogs and newspapers repeated inaccurate rumors that the book contains the passage, "I will stand with the Muslims should the political winds shift in an ugly direction." The actual quote does not mention Muslims at all, referring instead to Arab and Pakistani Americans in the context of immigrant communities generally.

== Versions and translations ==
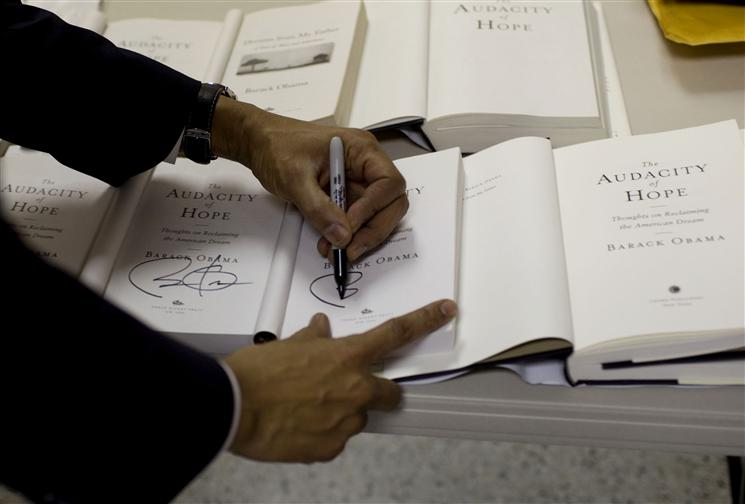
Obama signs copies of The Audacity of Hope at a town hall meeting in Elkhart, Indiana, in 2009.

- English: The Audacity of Hope: Thoughts on Reclaiming the American Dream,
  - Hardcover Crown Publishing Group (October 17, 2006), ISBN 978-0-307-23769-9.
  - Paperback Edinburgh : Canongate Press (2008), ISBN 978-1-84767-083-0.
  - Audio CD: RH Audio; Abridged edition (October 17, 2006), ISBN 978-0-7393-3408-9.
  - Large print Random House Large Print (November 7, 2006), ISBN 978-0-7393-2665-7.
  - Large print Paragon Press (2009), ISBN 978-1-4084-1424-8.
  - Braille Crown (2006), OCLC 263091599.
- Albanian: Guximi për të shpresuar : refleksione për rikthimin e ëndrrës amerikane, translated by Diana Ndroqi, Marin Barleti University Press, (November 17, 2008), ISBN 978-99943-0-080-8
- Arabic: Barāk Ubāmā : jurʼat al-amal, translation, Madbūlī al-Saghīr (al-Jīzah), (2009), ISBN 978-977-286-274-0, OCLC 630811628.
- Bulgarian: Дързостта на надеждата / Dŭrzostta na nadezhdata Сиела, Sofii︠a︡ : Siela, (2008), ISBN 978-954-28-0354-6.
- Chinese (Simplified): Wú wèi de xī wàng (无畏的希望), translated by Luo Xuanmin, Jing Wang and Yin Yin Law Press at Beijing, (August 25, 2008), ISBN 978-7-5036-8690-0.
- Chinese (Traditional): Yǒng wǎng zhí qián (勇往直前), translated by Joyce Chen and Xun Pan, Business Weekly Publications, Taipei, (September, 2008), ISBN 978-986-6571-28-2.
- Catalan: L'audàcia de l'esperança. Ed Mina (Barcelona, 2008) ISBN 978-84-96499-99-7.
- Croatian: Odvažnost nade : razmišljanja o obnavljanju američkog sna, translation, Profil (Zagreb), (2008), ISBN 978-953-12-0937-3, OCLC 496864339.
- Czech: Odvaha doufat : úvahy o vzkříšení amerického snu, translated by Lucie Matějková, Voznice : Leda; Praha : Rozmluvy, 2010, 342 p., ISBN 978-80-7335-251-6 (LEDA), ISBN 978-80-87440-07-0 (Rozmluvy)
- Danish: Mod til at håbe. Tanker om generobringen af den amerikanske drøm, translated by Niels Ivar Larsen, Information 2008, ISBN 978-87-7514-195-1.
- Dutch: De herovering van de Amerikaanse droom, Atlas (Amsterdam), (2007), ISBN 978-90-450-1380-0.
- Finnish Rohkeus toivoa. Ajatuksia amerikkalaisen unelman pelastamisesta, BTJ Kustannus, (2009), ISBN 978-951-692-738-4.
- French: L'audace d'espérer: une nouvelle conception de la politique américaine, Presses de la Cité, (April 5, 2007) 368 p., ISBN 978-2-258-07451-4.
- Hoffnung wagen. Gedanken zur Rückbesinnung auf den American Dream. Riemann Verlag. April 5, 2007. p. 466. ISBN 978-3-570-50081-1.
- Greek: Τολμώ να ελπίζω : σκέψεις για την ανάκτηση του Αμερικανικού ονείρου, translated by Royla Kokolioy, Polis (Athēna), (2008) 467 p., ISBN 978-960-435-168-8.
- Hindi: Āśā kā saverā, translated by Aruṇa Ānanda, Prabhāta Prakāśana (Dillī), (2009), ISBN 978-81-7315-728-8, OCLC 456521743.
- Hungarian: Vakmerő remények : gondolatok az amerikai álom újraélesztéséről, translated by István Lantos, Budapest : Cor Leonis, (2008), ISBN 978-963-06-5218-6.
- Indonesian: Menerjang harapan : dari Jakarta menuju Gedung Putih, Ufuk Press, Jakarta, (2007), ISBN 978-979-1238-34-2.
- Italian: l'Audacia della speranza, traduttore: Laura Cecilia Dapelli, Lorenza Lanza, Patrizia Vicentini, Introduttore: Walter Veltroni, ISBN 978-88-17-01658-2.
- Japanese: Gasshūkoku saisei : ōinaru kibō o idaite (合衆国再生 : 大いなる希望を抱いて), translated by Shikō Tanahashi, Kaedeshoten : Daiyamondosha, (Tokyo, Japan), (2007), ISBN 978-4-478-00353-4.
- Korean: Pŏrak Obama, Tamdaehan Hŭimang (버락 오바마, 담대한 희망), translated by Hong Su-won (홍수원), Random House Korea, (2007), ISBN 978-89-255-1105-4.
- Malay: Keberanian menggapai harapan : gagasan meraih kembali impian Amerika, Institut Terjemahan Negara Malaysia, Kuala Lumpur, (2009), ISBN 978-983-068-349-2.
- Marathi: Audācītī apha hōp : dharībhiya-- aśāvādācaṅ!, translated by Prakāśā Bhāve, Ameya Prakāśana (Pune), (2009) ISBN 978-81-907294-3-7, OCLC 560466082.
- Persian: جسارت امید / Jesārat-e omid, translated by Abolḥasan Tahāmī, Enteshārāt-e Negāh (Tehrān), (2009), ISBN 978-964-351-535-5, OCLC 489354708.
- Polish: Odwaga nadziei : [moja droga życiowa, wartości i ideały polityczne], translated by Grzegorz Kołodziejczyk, Wydawn Albatros A. Kuryłowicz (Warszawa), (2008), ISBN 978-83-7359-801-0.
- Portuguese: A Audácia da Esperança: Reflexões sobre a Reconquista do Sonho Americano (2007), Editora Larousse do Brasil, ISBN 978-85-7635-219-8.
- Russian: Derzost' Nadezhdy (October 2008) ISBN 978-5-395-00209-9.
- Serbian: Smelost nade : o američkom snu i kako ga ponovo ostvariti, Beograd : Interkomerc, a.d., 2008, ISBN 978-86-905659-2-4.
- Slovenian: Pogum za upanje : misli o obnovi ameriškega sna, translated by Igor Antič and Milan Kučan, Sanje, (2008), ISBN 978-961-6653-95-4.
- Spanish: La audacia de la esperanza: Reflexiones sobre cómo restaurar el sueño americano, translated by Claudia Casanova and Juan Elroy Roca, Knopf Publishing Group (June 19, 2007), ISBN 978-0-307-38711-0.
  - Audio CD: Findaway World, LLC (2009), ISBN 978-1-60847-562-9.
- Swedish: Att våga hoppas : tankar om den amerikanska drömmen, translated by Thomas Engström, Bonnier Group (Stockholm), (2008), ISBN 978-91-0-011807-5.
- Tamil: நம்மால் முடியும் / Nammal mutiyum, translated by Nākūr Rūmi, Kizhakku Pathippagam (Chennai), (2009), ISBN 978-81-8493-466-3, OCLC 690516102.
- Thai: Klā wang klā plīan, translated by Sunisā Kānčhanakun and Krung Thēp, Samnakphim Matichon, (2009), ISBN 978-974-02-0285-1.
- Vietnamese: Hy vọng táo bạo: Suy nghĩ về việc tìm lại giấc mơ Mỹ, translated by Nguyễn Hằng, Nhà xuất bản Trẻ (Thành phố Hồ Chí Minh), (2008), OCLC 298347843.
