= Our Oceans =

2024 documentary series

- Genre: Docuseries
- Directed by: Abraham Joffe; Nick Lyon; Joe Tuck; Rachel Scott; Caroline Menzies
- Presented by: Barack Obama
- Composer: Ho Ling Tang
- Countries of origin: United Kingdom; United States
- Original language: English
- No. of seasons: 1
- No. of episodes: 5

Production
- Executive producers: James Honeyborne; Barack Obama; Michelle Obama
- Producer: Jonathan Smith
- Production companies: Wild Space Productions; Freeborne Media; Higher Ground Productions

Original release
- Network: Netflix
- Release: 20 November 2024

Our Oceans is a five-part Netflix documentary series that explores the wonder of Earth's oceans. It is presented and narrated by former president of the United States Barack Obama and was released on November 20, 2024.

== See also ==
- Our Great National Parks
