= Obstetrical & Gynecological Survey =

- Discipline: Obstetrics and gynaecology
- Language: English
- Edited by: Lee A. Learman, Aaron B. Caughey, Mary E. Norton

Publication details
- History: 1946-present
- Publisher: Wolters Kluwer
- Frequency: Monthly
- Impact factor: 1.863 (2014)

Standard abbreviations
- ISO 4: Obstet. Gynecol. Surv.

Indexing
- CODEN: OGSUA8
- ISSN: 0029-7828 (print); 1533-9866 (web)
- OCLC no.: 1760994

Links
- Journal homepage; Online access; Online archive

Obstetrical & Gynecological Survey is a monthly peer-reviewed medical journal covering obstetrics and gynaecology. It was established in 1946 and is published by Wolters Kluwer. The editors-in-chief are Lee A. Learman (Florida Atlantic University), Aaron B. Caughey (Oregon Health & Science University), and Mary E. Norton (University of California, San Francisco). According to the Journal Citation Reports, the journal has a 2014 impact factor of 1.863, ranking it 38th out of 79 journals in the category "Obstetrics & Gynecology".
