= Shiao Yi =

Taiwanese novelist

- 蕭逸
- Born: Shiao Ching Jen; June 4, 1935; Beijing, China
- Died: November 19, 2018 (aged 83); Los Angeles, California, United States
- Citizenship: United States
- Education: Republic of China Naval Academy (BS); Chung Yuan Christian University (BS)
- Occupation: Novelist
- Spouse: Liu Meiqing
- Children: 3
- Writing career
- Language: Chinese
- Period: 1960–2017
- Genre: Novel
- Subject: Wuxia
- Notable works: Ma Ming Feng Xiao Xiao; Princess Wuyou; Sister Gan Nineteen

Shiao Yi (simplified Chinese: 萧逸; traditional Chinese: 蕭逸; pinyin: Xiāo Yì; 4 June 1935 – 19 November 2018) was a Chinese-American wuxia ("martial hero") novelist. and screenwriter who is considered one of the greatest of the genre in the modern era. Shiao Yi was also the founder and first chairman of the Chinese Writers' Association of North America.

Shiao Yi's Wuxia novels are known for their emphasis on traditional Chinese culture and ethics, the archetype of the Xia (hero), understanding of Taoist philosophy, exquisite sensitivity of romance and human emotions as well as a wide variety of writing styles. Haven written 55 novels and novellas as well as nearly 1,000 essays in the course of his life. He is considered a new school Wuxia novelist and is also considered one of the pioneers of the modern xianxia ("immortal heroes") sub-genre.

Twenty of his works have been adapted for film and hundreds of hours of television, influencing the East Asian cultural spheres and the Chinese diaspora.

Shiao Yi is often mentioned alongside Jin Yong in the phrase "Nan Jin Bei Shiao" (Chinese: 南金北蕭; lit. 'Jin of the south and Shiao of the north'), and as one of the Five Tigers of the Taiwanese Wuxia Scene (台灣武俠界五虎上將) together with Gu Long, Wolong Sheng, Sima Ling, and Zhuge Qingyun.

== Early life ==
Shiao was born Shiao Ching-Jen (萧敬人; 蕭敬人; Xiāo Jìngrēn) in Beijing, on June 4, 1935, to Shiao Chichu, a general of the 26th National Revolutionary Army of the Republic of China (ROC) who was a pivotal figure in successful campaigns against the Japanese. His ancestral home is in Heze, Shandong, also the home to the heroes of classic Chinese novel, The Water Margin.

Shiao had a misfortunate childhood and said in an interview that it was a miracle that he made it to adulthood alive. Born two months premature, he then spent two months in an infant incubator thanks to the modern German medical facilities at the Beijing Friendship Hospital. He spent his childhood in Chongqing during the Second Sino-Japanese War. At age five, he fell off a three-story building when his elder sister challenged him to run on the rooftop with his eyes closed. He then spent six months in the hospital. Shiao moved to Nanjing when he was nine years old. In fourth grade, he spent a summer selling ice-cream with his friend Erhuai (二槐) and ended up getting typhoid fever and was absent from school for half a year. While he was resting at home, he spent a lot of time reading, especially martial arts novels written by Huanzhulouzhu, Zheng Zhengyin, Zhu Zhenmu and Wang Dulu.

After the defeat of the Nationalists by the Communists in the Chinese Civil War in 1949, his family moved to Taiwan, leaving behind their properties in Nanjing, Hankou and Fuzhou. Shiao attended Jianguo Middle School (建國中學) in Taipei. He was then accepted to the Republic of China Naval Academy. Two years later, he left school and went home to support his family.

== Education ==
At a very young age, Shiao was exposed to Peking Opera as well as artists including Ma Lianliang and Shang Xiaoyun. There were also many private performances at home (堂会) when he was growing up, from which he later drew inspiration for his writing. One of his father's soldiers, Liang Yanquan (梁燕全), used to be a Shandong clapper ballad performer and told stories such as The Seven Heroes and Five Gallants to Shiao and his friends, and these became Shiao's introduction to Wuxia.

As a military general, Shiao's father was very loyal to the Kuomintang government and did not allow anyone in the family to criticize the government. He also enforced strict rules at home for his children, such as getting up by 6AM, going to bed by 11PM, no smoking or drinking alcohol, and no talking while eating. Thanks to his family education, Shiao was not only very disciplined, but was also instilled with traditional values such as service to one's country, which led him to identify with the ideals of chivalry often found in Wuxia novels. Shiao and his siblings were all very afraid of their father when they were young, but since he often fought on the frontlines and was away from home, Shiao had a lot of freedom to pursue his own interests.

By his fifth and sixth years of elementary school, Shiao has already developed a strong interest in literature and read world classics such as Jean-Christophe and Camille.

After moving to Taiwan in 1949, Shiao went to Jianguo Middle School and became classmates with writer Pai Hsien-yung, who was also the son of a military general, Bai Chongxi. At school, Shiao read almost all of Jin Yong and other Wuxia novelists’ works. In his second year of middle school, Shiao wrote a short story Yellow Cattle, which was published in influential literary magazines in Taiwan, including Ye Feng (野風) and Ban Yue Wen Yi (半月文藝).

After high school, Shiao went to the Republic of China Naval Academy for school to fulfill his father's wish that he become a scientist. At the time, his father had already been sick for almost nine years, and spent all of his savings paying hospital and medical bills. During Shiao's sophomore year in college, his father died, and he decided to quit school and go home.

After returning home, Shiao planned to apply to a literature program, but later got into the chemical engineering program at the Chung Yuan Christian College of Science and Engineering. Luckily, Shiao soon started a career in writing wuxia novels, and supported his six younger siblings financially for seven years with the royalties until they finished school and started working.

== Career ==
When Shiao was attending the Naval Academy, a high school friend Zhong (钟) suggested that he should write a Wuxia novel, since he loved reading them so much. The friend also told him that he could make 300 to 400 new Taiwan dollars per novel. At the time, Wuxia novels were very popular in Hong Kong and Taiwan, and there had been an abundance of Wuxia publications in the market. Shiao took the advice and wrote his first novel, Iron Geese, Wings of Frost (鐵雁霜翎) when he was 23.

With his friend's introduction, editors of the Xiangji Publishing House (祥記出版社) received the manuscript written in ink and gave it a very positive response. They published the novel in 1960 and it became an instant hit. The Shaw Brothers Studio bought the film rights of the novel and made a two part movie franchise based on it, starring Yu So-chow, Hong Kong's most successful female action star at the time.

The overnight success of Shiao's first book immediately brought him a lot of attention from other publishers, and his second novel The Seven Fists of Ching (七禽掌) was also very well received in the market. In 1961, Shiao had already returned to college and had been writing in his spare time, but he decided to quit school again to pursue writing Wuxia novels as a professional writer. For the rest of Shiao's career, he was a professional writer, making him the one and only Wuxia novelist in Hong Kong and Taiwan who never had a second career or worked a single day doing any job other than writing.

Shiao soon became one of the five highest paid writers in Taiwan along with Gu Long, Wolong Sheng, Sima Ling and Zhuge Qingyun, making 2,000 New Taiwan dollars per book (around 20,000 words), while the average Wuxia novelist was making 800 New Taiwan dollars. They were also called the Five Tigers of the Taiwanese Wuxia Scene.

In the early 70's, Shiao was already a screenwriter for three major Taiwanese TV networks, including the China Television Company (中國電視公司). He also started writing serials for newspapers and at one point Shiao was writing simultaneously for more than 20 newspaper at the same time, including Hong Kong Times (香港時報), Sin Chew Daily, The Star and Taiwan Daily. It was Shiao's discipline and persistence instead of inspiration that kept him writing non-stop. In a meeting with Stan Lee at the Crustacean Restaurant in Beverly Hills, California, they both agreed that the secret to being prolific was getting up early and writing regardless of inspiration.

After departing Taiwan for America, Shiao's career grew on two unlikely fronts, first, being welcomed into mainland China, the land of his birth, as one of the first wave of non-mainland writers into China and had the opportunity to define the Wuxia genre to post cultural revolution Chinese generation. Beginning in the 1980s, he quickly became one of the top Wuxia novelists in China, reaching a national audience through multiple full library publications, television adaptations, and even serialized radio shows. His works have remained in publication in China since its start in the 1980s.

In 2009, Shiao's manuscripts, photos and letters formally joined the permanent collection of the National Museum of Modern Chinese Literature (中国现代文学馆), exhibited alongside many of China literary greats of all time.

Writing from his home in Los Angeles, California, Shiao unexpectedly became known as the "American Puma" by literary critics, becoming the first and only Chinese American Wuxia writer of acclaim.

Throughout his career, Shiao wrote 55 novels and novellas as well as nearly 1,000 essays, making him one of the most prolific Wuxia writers in the history. His works were first published in mainland China in 1986. His novel, Sister Gan Nineteen (甘十九妹), was adapted into a TV series by Shandong Television in 1996. The series was considered one of the two groundbreaking milestone pieces of Wuxia TV production in mainland China along with Bai Mei Da Xia (白眉大侠), earning Shiao nationwide popularity. The TV series still remains a part of the collective memory of the post-70's and post-80's generations. Sister Gan Nineteen was remade for television again in 2015, and after a run on the Movie Channel of Hubei Television, was placed on iQiyi, which as of 2020 has received 300 million views.

== Immigration ==
In 1977, Shiao and his family emigrated to Los Angeles, California, United States. Prior leaving Taiwan, Shiao's older sister married an Australian diplomat and moved to Australia; while his mother and siblings all immigrated to America. One sister married a Chinese man in Johannesburg, South Africa, and his six other brothers and sisters all emigrated to the United States. Shiao was the only person in his family that was left in Taiwan. Since he could work remotely as a writer, Shiao ended up emigrating to the United States via an EB-1 visa, granted to immigrants of extraordinary ability.

After arriving in Los Angeles, Shiao had a hard time adapting to the new environment during the first three years. The difficulty of maintaining relationships with editors led to him losing most of his writing jobs. It was a time before the internet and email, and newspaper editors did not enjoy dealing with long-distance calls and fax machines. However, thanks to an old colleague at Sin Chew Daily in Hong Kong, Shiao got a job writing news articles about American society. The newspaper created two new columns for Shiao, who used two different pen names, Xueni (雪尼) and Hongzao (紅棗).

As Shiao was about to change his profession, he got the opportunity to write a column for the United Daily News replacing Gu Long, who had often failed to deliver manuscripts on time. He then got another job writing a serialized Wuxia novel at China Times to replace Jin Yong's serial publication of The Heaven Sword and Dragon Saber. Being the breadwinner of the family, Shiao continued to write novels for these two newspapers for the next seven to eight years, until his three children grew up.

As the only Chinese American Wuxia novelist of his time, Shiao influenced tens of millions of readers with his writing. However, being far away from his homeland, Shiao was not able to promote or market his works in person and relied primarily on his books and readers to do his bidding. Feeling lonely in a foreign country, Shiao would often meet with Chinese friends from the mainland, Hong Kong and Taiwan who loved literature. He later started the North America Chinese Writers’ Association in 1993 and served as the organization's chairman. At the invitation of the Chinese Writers’ Association, Shiao assembled a delegation of 11 writers, and they made their first group visit to mainland China in 1994. Following the initial visit, Shiao made several more visits to mainland China, and continued to foster mutual understanding and exchange between writers from mainland China, Hong Kong, Taiwan and the Chinese diaspora. The North America Chinese Writers’ Association, Los Angeles started a Chinese writing class in 1993, and Shiao served as a teacher. The association also launched its own publication, Los Angeles Writers (洛城作家) in 1994.

== Personal life ==
Shiao married Liu Meiqing (刘美清; 劉美清) in 1964, and they had three sons: William Shiao (also known as Shiao Peiyu; 萧培宇; 蕭培宇), Peter Shiao, and Anthony Shiao (also known as Shiao Peilun; 萧培伦; 蕭培倫). Liu was the classmate of Shiao's younger sister and a fan of Shiao's works. The two met at a bookstore in Taiwan.

As a writer, Shiao would often identify strongly with the characters that he created and go through emotional journeys with them. Once, Shiao felt so emotional that he almost tried to kill himself. Luckily, Liu arrived home from work and Shiao cried in her arms, telling her that she would not have been able to see him again if she had gotten home a bit later. After that day, Liu would call Shiao every few minutes from work to check in on him, just to make sure that he was alive.

== Relationship with contemporaries ==
As one of the five tigers of the Taiwanese Wuxia scene, Shiao was friends with Gu Long, Wolong Sheng, Sima Ling and Zhuge Qingyun. Shiao and Gu Long were the youngest among the five, but soon surpassed the other three in popularity.

Shiao met Gu Long at a dinner hosted by the publisher that they both worked for. They found out that they went to the same middle school and soon became close friends. Gu Long later served as Shiao's Best Man at his wedding. Both Shiao and Gu Long wrote very quickly. On one occasion, the two of them went to a hot spring in Yilan County to write. Shiao wrote a record-breaking 24,000 words in a single day, which was the amount of text needed then to publish a novel. Shiao and Gu Long also worked on a novel together, Hiss of the Dragon (龍吟曲).

Although Shiao and Gu Long were close friends, they had very different personalities and habits. Shiao was a gentleman while Gu Long was a womanizer; Shiao was an early bird while Gu Long was a night owl; Shiao was a teetotaler, while Gu Long was an alcoholic. Shiao even suggested that Gu Long drink in moderation, but Gu Long refused by saying “What’s the meaning of life if I can’t drink? I’d rather die without alcohol.” Prior to his death, Gu Long called Shiao and expressed that he regretted not having listened to his advice earlier.

Overwhelmed by the amount of writing he had to do every day at the time, Shiao did not spend much time reading his fellow writers' works. This had a positive outcome, because while all the other Wuxia writers were heavily influenced by Gu Long's writing style, Shiao was able to create his own unique style.

Shiao was good friends with novelist and screenwriter Ni Kuang as well. They met when they were both writing screenplays for Shaw Brothers Studio. Later, when Jin Yong and Ni Kuang started the magazine Wuxia and History (武侠与历史) together, Ni Kuang invited Shiao to write for it.

Shiao was friends with actress Brigitte Lin Ching-hsia, and thought of her as the ideal candidate to play the lead of Sister Gan Nineteen.

Shiao also had a close friendship with writer Liang Shih-chiu, who was both a respected mentor for him and the most loyal reader of Shiao's work. Shiao shared the sense of loneliness that Liang felt as a writer. He thought that writers should both enjoy and avoid loneliness, and that writing was a great source of comfort and catharsis.

== Death ==
On November 19, 2018, Shiao died of lung cancer at age 83 in a hospital in Los Angeles, only 20 days after the Chinese literary world lost another Wuxia novelist, Jin Yong, and 7 days after Stan Lee, the American comic book writer and publisher whom he had met with in Los Angeles.

Several major Chinese news media published the obituary written by the North America Chinese Writers’ Association, Los Angeles, commemorating the loss of "Nan Jin Bei Shiao,” which referred to Jin Yong and Shiao Yi, the two literary titans of Wuxia who died within weeks of each other.

=== Posthumous adaptations and honors ===
Shiao's entire body of work is being adapted posthumously by his second son, Chinese American entrepreneur and CEO of Immortal Studios, Peter Shiao, as the foundation for an inter-connected modern Wuxia “storyverse” that will first be published as English language comics in partnership with a new generation of writers and artists.

The father-son collaboration was first announced in 2013, and was widely covered by mainstream media in both China and the United States, including Variety, The Hollywood Reporters, People’s Daily, and Sina. Shiao Yi said it was very heartening to be working with his son.

UCLA's Research Library in 2020, has begun efforts to house Shiao's entire literary collection and personal effects, making him the first writer of Asian ancestry to join the UCLA literary collection.

Tie Ning, the Chairwoman of the Chinese Writer's Association, wrote of Shiao, “the death of Mr. Shiao Yi is a huge loss to both Chinese literature and world literature. His achievements and contributions will be remembered in our hearts.”

== Works ==
In his career, Shiao wrote 55 novels and novellas and went through three different creative phases.

The first phase was in the 1960s. Shiao had written 11 novels including Iron Geese, Wings of Frost and The Seven Fists of Ching before he turned 30. These novels were heavily influenced by the works of 1920's Wuxia novelist Wang Dulu such as Crane Startles Kunlun (鶴驚崑崙) and Precious Sword, Golden Hairpin (寶劍金釵). The style of writing was very sentimental and melancholy.

The second stage was in the 1970s. Shiao published works such as The Seven Sons of Kunlun (崑崙七子), Demons Beyond the Fortress (塞外伏魔), collectively known as “Chronicles of the Immortal Swordsmen” and Mr. Hibernation (冬眠先生) prior to turning 40. These works treated the Wuxia world as historical background while exploring new modes of creative expression. However, these works were still heavily influenced by the writers from the 1920s and 1930s, such as Huanzhulouzhu (還珠樓主). These works had more fantasy elements that are known to be characteristic of Xianxia novels and focused on the immortal swordsman's self-cultivation, resembling Huanzhulouzhu's Legend of the Swordsmen of the Mountains of Shu (蜀山劍俠傳).

The third stage was in the late 1970s, when Shiao gradually came up with a writing method of his own, surpassing the previous “sentimental melancholy" and "fantasy immortal swordsman" stages. He followed a new path, focusing on creating atmosphere and human conflicts. When it came to depicting martial arts, he adopted uses of modern optics and other principles in physics. He was critical of the "breakthrough" of the "new school" Wuxia novelists who focused disproportionately on the wu instead of xia in their works; and he was also one of the very few who were unaffected by Gu Long's stylistic influence.

Shiao Yi's major works are:

English title	Chinese title	Date of First Publication	First Published Publication	Notes
Iron Geese, Wings of Frost	鐵雁霜翎	1960	Ming Hsiang	a.k.a. 風雷谷; the 2nd part is called 江湖兒女
The Seven Fists of Ching	七禽掌	1960	Ming Hsiang	a.k.a. 鷹飛鶴舉, its sequel is 冷劍烈女
Golden Scissor and Iron Flag	金剪鐵旗	1 October 1961	Chen Shan Mei	a.k.a. 白如雲, 鐵旗怪俠傳 & 劍氣白雲
The World of Wuxia	武俠天下	1 October 1961	Ming Hsiang	
Chant of the Vigorous Grass	勁草吟	2 December 1961	Independence Evening Post	
Tiger Eyes and Moth Brow	虎目蛾眉	1961	Chen Shan Mei	a.k.a. 俏娥眉
The Sand Washing Wave	浪淘沙	1962	Ming Hsiang	a.k.a. 飞花揽月记
Phoenix on the Sycamore	鳳棲梧桐	1962	Han Lin	
The Music of Wind and Dust	風塵譜	1963	Ta Tung	
Scroll of the Celestial Demons	天魔卷	1 July 1964	Ming Hsiang	
The Frosty Peach and Plum	桃李冰霜	1 August 1964	Chen Shan Mei	a.k.a. 春江萬里情, 劍氣紅顏 & 花蕊八劍; It includes 桃花劫, 連心劍, 睡蓮仙子, 寶捲風雲, 骨肉情仇 & 劍氣紅顏
Red String & Gold Orbs	紅線金丸	1964	Chen Shan Mei	a.k.a. 武林雙絕
The Thief of the Red Lantern	紅燈盜	1964	Ta Mei	a.k.a. 紅燈盞
The Resurrection Tune	還魂曲	1 February 1966	Chen Shan Mei	a.k.a. 天涯歌, 俠侶 or 挑燈看劍
Figure of the Warriors	壯士圖	1 August 1966	Chen Shan Mei	a.k.a. 雪落馬蹄 & 五刃梟雄
The Lion Head Hero	獅頭怪俠	1971	Wu Lin	a.k.a. 冷劍娥媚
Crane Dance in the Divine Land	鹤舞神州	1972	Wu Lin	
Famous Knife of Taiyuan	太原名刀	1973	Wu Lin	
Horse Neighing in the Wind	馬鳴風蕭蕭	18 February 1974	Taiwan Daily	a.k.a. 鐵骨冰心 & 武林廿四令
Zhan Yun Fei	戰雲飛	1974	Wu Lin	
Sound of Gold and Jade	金玉鳴	1 December 1976	Chun Chiu	
Sunny Thunder	艷陽雷	1 January 1977	Ta Mei	
Hiss of the Dragon	龍吟曲	1 January 1977	Ta Mei	a.k.a. 无颜沧海
Heavenly Dragon and Earthly Tiger	天龍地虎	1 January 1977	Ta Mei	sequel to 龍吟曲
Diagram of the Ten Treasures	十錦圖	1 November 1978	Wu Lin	a.k.a. 雪嶺珠魂
Leaping Fish and Flying Eagle	魚躍鷹飛	1978	Wu Lin	
Two Heroines	雙女俠	1 September 1979	Hsiung Yu	
Sister Gan Nineteen	甘十九妹	1980	Han Lin	
Story of the Long Sword	長劍篇	3 February 1982	Ta Hua Daily	a.k.a. 長劍相思 or 鳳點頭
The Killer Must Die	殺人者死	9 February 1983	Wu Yi	
The River of the Flowing Flowers	飲馬流花河	7 April 1983	China Times	a.k.a. 搖光劍影
The Young and Old Duo Heroes	老少雙雄	25 January 1984	Wu Yi	
Phoenix of Kunlun	鳳棲崑崙	4 April 1985	China Times	a.k.a. 含情看劍
Red Line Heroine	紅線女傑	February 1986	Shandong Friendship Publishing House	
Princess Princess Wuyou	無憂公主	1987	China Friendship Publishing Co.	a.k.a. 西山翠冷, and its two parts are 遊子引 and 海無顏
Man with a Thousand Faces	千面郎君	1988	The Publishing House of Minority Nationalities	
Golden Bow Heroine	金弓姹女	1988	Military Science Press	a.k.a. 金弓女傑
Releasing the Golden Blade	笑解金刀	7 December 1989	Liberty Times	
Jade of the Seven Glitters	西風冷畫屏	1989	China Friendship Publishing Co.	a.k.a. 七星翡翠, part of 七道彩虹
The Crane Dance	鶴舞神州	April 1990	China Friendship Publishing Co.	
Chronicles of the Immortal Swordsman	劍仙傳奇	February 1992	The Publishing House of the China Literary Federation	It includes 火雷破山海, 崑崙七子 and 塞外伏魔
The Jade Rabbit is Rising	玉兔東昇	1993	Sino-Culture Press	part of 七道彩虹
Mr. Hibernation	冬眠先生	1993	Sino-Culture Press	part of 七道彩虹
Tai-Chan’s Dragons	太蒼之龍	1993	Sino-Culture Press	part of 七道彩虹
Stallion of the Heavenly Realms	天岸馬	1993	Sino-Culture Press	part of 七道彩虹
Sword under Moon Light of Night	今宵月下劍	1993	Sino-Culture Press	part of 七道彩虹
Cries of the Golden Rooster	金雞三啼	1993	Sino-Culture Press	part of 七道彩虹
Blood on Petals	血雨濺花紅	October 1996	China Friendship Publishing Co.	
Double Swallows of the Wind and Rain	風雨燕雙飛	1996	China Friendship Publishing Co.	
Rainbow of the Snowy Mountains	雪山飛虹	1 October 1998	Taibai Art and Literature Press	a.k.a. 長嘯
The Sword of Frost	凝霜劍	1 October 1998	Taibai Art and Literature Press	a.k.a. 神州一劍
The Nine-Dragon Blade	九龍刀	1998	Da Liang	
The Romance of the Iron Pen	鐵筆春秋	1998	Taibai Art and Literature Press	a.k.a. 殘山俠隱
Pillow Knife Spring Dream	枕刀春夢	1999	Taibai Art and Literature Press	It includes four parts: 潘郎憔悴, 冷劍娥眉, 獅頭大俠 & 戰雲飛
Mirror Opening Chest	寶鏡開匣	2001	Taibai Art and Literature Press	

== Philosophy ==
The concept of xia (俠) was a strong theme in Shiao's works. According to Shiao, a xia was someone who had great power as well as great sympathy for the weak and underprivileged in society. They were swordsmen who had compassion, willpower and were not afraid of powerful governments. They often fought for equality and justice for the ordinary people and even sacrificed themselves for the greater cause. They were martyrs born in the worst times, fighting powerful evils, and therefore were always lonely and lived desolate lives. For Shiao, the concept of xia originated from Mohism in the Spring and Autumn period, got its foothold in Confucianism in the Warring States period,^{[3]} and reached its pinnacle in Taoism.

In his Wuxia novels, Shiao always emphasized the way of xia, which was the spirit of chivalry, much more than the merit of wu (武), which was power and force. In Shiao's opinion, without compassion, a person with only force or power would end up becoming a hooligan or villain; while a person with compassion and bravery would be respected as a xia even if he or she did not have strong martial arts skills. In an interview, Shiao talked about the differences between the Chinese Wuxia and the Japanese samurai. Japanese samurai were warriors who were loyal to their masters and emperors, but Chinese Wuxia warriors did not have masters. They served the people, fought for justice and were loyal to their own conscience.^{[4]} Shiao thought of the way of xia is a universal value similar to the code of chivalry in Western culture. However, the Chinese Wuxia warriors were usually much more reserved, virtuous and self-sacrificing compared with European knights and American cowboys and superheroes, also when it came to love and romance.

As a Wuxia novelist, Shiao was himself an embodiment of a xia in real life. As a lover of traditional Chinese culture, Shiao studied astrology and feng shui, and also practiced qigong, a centuries-old practice to cultivate and balance qi, which refers to the energy circulating through the body.^{[1]} Shiao's works also showed great respect for traditional Chinese culture. To create characters, he drew characteristics from Confucian values such as the five virtues: benevolence (仁), righteousness (義), etiquette (禮), wisdom (智) and sincerity (信),^{[4]} as well as Taoist virtues such as compassion (慈), frugality (儉) and humility (不敢為天下先).

However, unlike Jin Yong, whose works often emphasized and discussed Confucian ideals such as the rigid rituals and social order between ruler and subject, parent and child, and master and apprentice, Shiao's works focused more on the Taoist self-cultivation philosophy and teaching about the various disciplines for achieving "perfection" by becoming one with the rhythms of the universe. In addition, while most of Jin's works are based on historical events and adopt a worldview that the heroes are normal human beings with extraordinary martial arts skills, heroes in many of Shiao's works transcend the limits of being human and become sublime, even immortal.

== Criticism ==
Shiao Yi was considered as the most influential new school Wuxia novelist in addition to Jin Yong, Liang Yusheng and Gu Long. He was one of the first Wuxia novelists to abandon the Zhang Hui style (章回体) and tell Wuxia stories in the modern vernacular. Shiao even wrote The River of the Flowing Flowers in an essay style. According to Renmin University of China Professor Leng Chengjin, old school Wuxia novels are those that are stylistically similar to The White Maiden Locked for Eternity in the Leifeng Pagoda (白娘子永鎭雷峰塔), a Wuxia novel written during the Ming dynasty. Whereas the traditional version of the story portrays the female protagonist as a villain, and Jin Yong's version portrays her as a hero, Shiao's retelling of the classic features a modern woman on a nuanced emotional journey.

Shiao was known for his depictions of women and romance in his writing, and many of his works feature female protagonists. Although Jin Yong and Gu Long also created female characters in their novels, they were usually secondary to the male heroes and served as their love interests; whereas Shiao focused more on the xia qualities of his female characters and treated them equally, if not better, than the male characters that he created. According to Shiao, women were more likely to be chivalrous, noting that the first xia recorded in Chinese history was a woman: Yuenü, who could defeat 100 men with her sword skills. Another modern female xia that Shiao admired was Qiu Jin, a revolutionary, feminist and writer executed after a failed uprising against the Qing Dynasty. Shiao also depicted gay romance in Phoenix of Kunlun (鳳棲崑崙).

Shiao wrote in a variety of styles, and the characters that he created ranged from more serious Wuxia swordsmen in classical historical settings to immortal swordsmen, humans who reached the level of deity through Taoist spiritual cultivation. He was one of the pioneers of the modern Qingxia (情侠) and Xianxia sub-genres of the Wuxia genre. Peking University Professor Kong Qingdong published an article saying that Shiao Yi was one of a kind in the Wuxia literature circle and should be credited as the Wuxia King of North America.

== Adaptations ==
Shiao's Wuxia novels have been adapted to numerous films and television series. He also wrote over twenty screenplays that were produced into films, and over two hundred teleplays.^{[18]}

=== Movies ===
Year	English title	Chinese title	Production company	Director	Actors
1963	The Iron Wild Goose and the Frosted Feather Sword	鐵雁霜翎	Shaw Brothers Studio	Hok Sing Wong	Lam Ka-Sing, Yu So-Chow, Chan Ho-kau & Kwan Hoi-Shan
1969	Seven Phoenix in the Cloud	雲中七鳳	Shaw Brothers Studio		
1969	The Ringing Sword	響尾金鈴	Sun Tai Lok Film Company	Lung Chien	Ling Fan, Chun Huang, Pin Chiang & Hui Mei Chen
1969	Beautiful Swordswoman	艷俠	Kuo Hwa Motion Pictures Co.	Su Yang	Ling Wang, Chi Ma & Yang-Ming Tsai
1970	The Black Fox	狐妻	Hwa Kuo Movie Studio Co.	Cheng Hou	Yang Yueh, Angeles Pan Yin-Tze, Hsiang Ting Ko & Ge Ming
1970	Clam Fairy	蚌仙	Hua Hsia Film Company	Kuo Hua Li	Ling Fan, Pin Chiang, Ching Chu, Chi-Lin Li, Fung Li, & Chiang Han
1970	Black Hurricane	黑旋風	Lung Yu Film Company	Peng Ling Tai	Mei-Yao Chang, Wei Ou, Han Hsieh & Ni Tien
	The Lion Head Hero	獅頭大俠	Cathay Organization		
	Mr. Tian Qi	田七郎	Grand Motion Pictures Co.		
1971	Black and White Umbrellas	黑白傘	But Fu Motion Picture Company	Fu But	Angeles Pan Yin-Tze, Ming Lei, Hung Lieh Chen, Li Meng & Peng Chang
1972	The Begging Swordsman	神笛丐俠	Kuo Hwa Motion Pictures Co.	Su Yang	Ling Wang, Yang-Ming Tsai, Chi Ma, Hsiao-Pao Ko, Chi-Lin Li & Feng Chang
	Hibernator	冬眠人	Golden Harvest Company		
1972	Rage of the Tiger	威震四方	Hoi Hwa Film Company	Hung-Chang Wang	Jimmy Wang Yu, Chiao Chiao, Yeh Tien, Chien Tsao, Ping-Yu Chang
1972	Boxers of Loyalty and Righteousness	忠義門	Lung Yu Film Company	Lung Chien	Jimmy Wang Yu, Pin Chiang, Yeh Tien, Chia-Lin Sun, & Hui Lou Chen
1973	Kung Fu Inferno	強中手	Hua Hsia Film Company	Hung-Min Chen	Yasuaki Kurata, Chiang Chen, Yue Yun Lin
	Mr. Mulang	木郎君	Shaw Brothers Studio		
	Kai Tian Pi Di	開天劈地	Cathay Organization		
1981	Phantom Killer	粉骷髏	Golden Harvest Company	Stanley Sui-Fan Fung	Qiqi Chen, Pai Wei, Fat Chung & Nora Tsang
2003	Cold Blooded Lady Killer	冷血奇花	ATV	Yee-Hung Lam	Chiang Hui Tsai, Pai Wei & Teddy Lin

=== TV Series ===
==== Mainland China ====
Year	English title	Chinese title	Episodes	Production company	Director	Actors
1996	The River of the Flowing Flowers	饮马流花河	25	China Teleplay Production Center Co.	Li Yemo	Wang Zhigang, Dong Xiaoyan, Yan Bingyan & Huang He
1996	Sister Gan Nineteen	甘十九妹	26	Shandong San Guan Film & TV Co.	Wang Wenjie	Yang Lu, Zhang Zijian, Yan Bingyan, Liu Yuhua, Wang Zhigang, Zhang Fumin & Sui Juanjuan
2004	Sword of Longing	长剑相思	42	China Television Media	Li Huimin	Chen Kun, Li Bingbing, Li Qian, Huang Jue, Wang Yanan, Tianxin
2005	Crying in the Wind	马鸣风萧萧	35	Shandong Hui Huang Shi Ji Film and TV Co.	Wang Xinmin	Shen Xiaohai, Wang Qi
2008	Princess Wuyou	无忧公主	38	China Television Media	Li Huimin	Kenny Ho, Faye Yu, Li Qian, Qiao Zhenyu, Zheng Xiaoning, Juanzi
2015	New Sister Gan Nineteen	新甘十九妹	34	Shandong Film and TV Group	Zhang Huili, Chen Yongge, Sun Deli	Zhang Dinghan, Cui Peng, Qin Xue, Ren Han, Sun Binhao, Song Minyu, Zhang Zhen

==== Taiwan ====
Year	English title	Chinese title	Episodes	Production company	Actors
	Iron Bone Ice Heart	鐵骨冰心	8	China Television Company	
1963	Wordless Bible	無字天書	40	China Television Company	Sihung Lung, Chou Chung Lien, Yeh Tien
	Deep White Cloud	白雲深深	30	China Television Company	
	Fu Lu Shou	福祿壽	30	Taiwan Television Enterprise	
	San Xiao Yan Yuan	三笑姻緣	30	Taiwan Television Enterprise	
	Luo Sheng Gu Ying	羅勝鼓影	3 hours	China Television Company	

== See also ==
- Jin Yong
- Liang Yusheng
- Gu Long
- Peter Shiao
- Xiao Zhichu
