= Shiao =

Shiao is a surname. Notable people with the surname include:

- Lora Shiao, American intelligence officer
- Peter Shiao (born 1967), Chinese media entrepreneur, film producer, social activist, and commentator
- Stephanie Shiao (born 1968), Taiwanese actress, model, singer, and writer

== See also ==
- Xiao (surname)
