= Marion Delgado =

Child who allegedly derailed a train in 1947

Marion Delgado was a five-year-old American boy whose image and story made the inside pages of Life magazine on June 2, 1947. The caption below the photograph read: "With a defiant smile, 5-year-old Marion Delgado shows how he placed a 25-pound concrete slab on the tracks and wrecked a passenger train."

The event was reported as an accident. On May 20, 1947, the curious five-year-old tried to crack the slab by bouncing it on the rails. When that did not work, he decided to let the Feather River Express passenger train do the heavy work of cracking the concrete chunk and he laid it across a rail near his Decoto, California home. "At 11:10 a.m. the Feather River Express boomed into Decoto at 50 mph. There was a crash. The engine jumped the rails, tore up 300 feet of track, hit a switch and turned over. The engineer and four other people were injured." When asked by the police, according to the Life article: "Marion shrugged, 'I couldn't break that big rock by myself', he said, 'so I decided to let the train do it.'"

== In popular culture ==
New Left Notes, vol. 4, Number 29 August 29, 1969. Featuring Marion Delgado from a 1947 Life magazine article

Just over two decades after the photo and caption ran in Life, the Students for a Democratic Society (SDS) (then under the control of the Weathermen) published the Delgado photograph and caption on the cover of their newspaper, New Left Notes without attribution and without the accompanying article.

Delgado's name was later elevated to that of "editor" after the other major groups in SDS condemned the cover.

Various Weathermen continued to invoke the name "Marion Delgado" for decades afterward. In Billy Ayers' book Fugitive Days, Delgado was mentioned as an Italian boy who derailed a train in Italy, with no injuries, and that Terry Robbins had gotten the photo "hot off the AP wire" in 1969. As of April 2015, the AP News Archive has no record of a Marion Delgado story in 1969.

Jeff Jones is quoted as calling out the name "Marion Delgado" to signal an attack by the Weathermen on the Drake Hotel during the Days of Rage protests in 1969. Additionally, Bernardine Dohrn used the name during a Weatherwomen rally.

The novel The Company You Keep mentions "Marion Delgado Brigades" (MDB) in several passages.
