= Bernardine Dohrn =

American radical activist, law professor

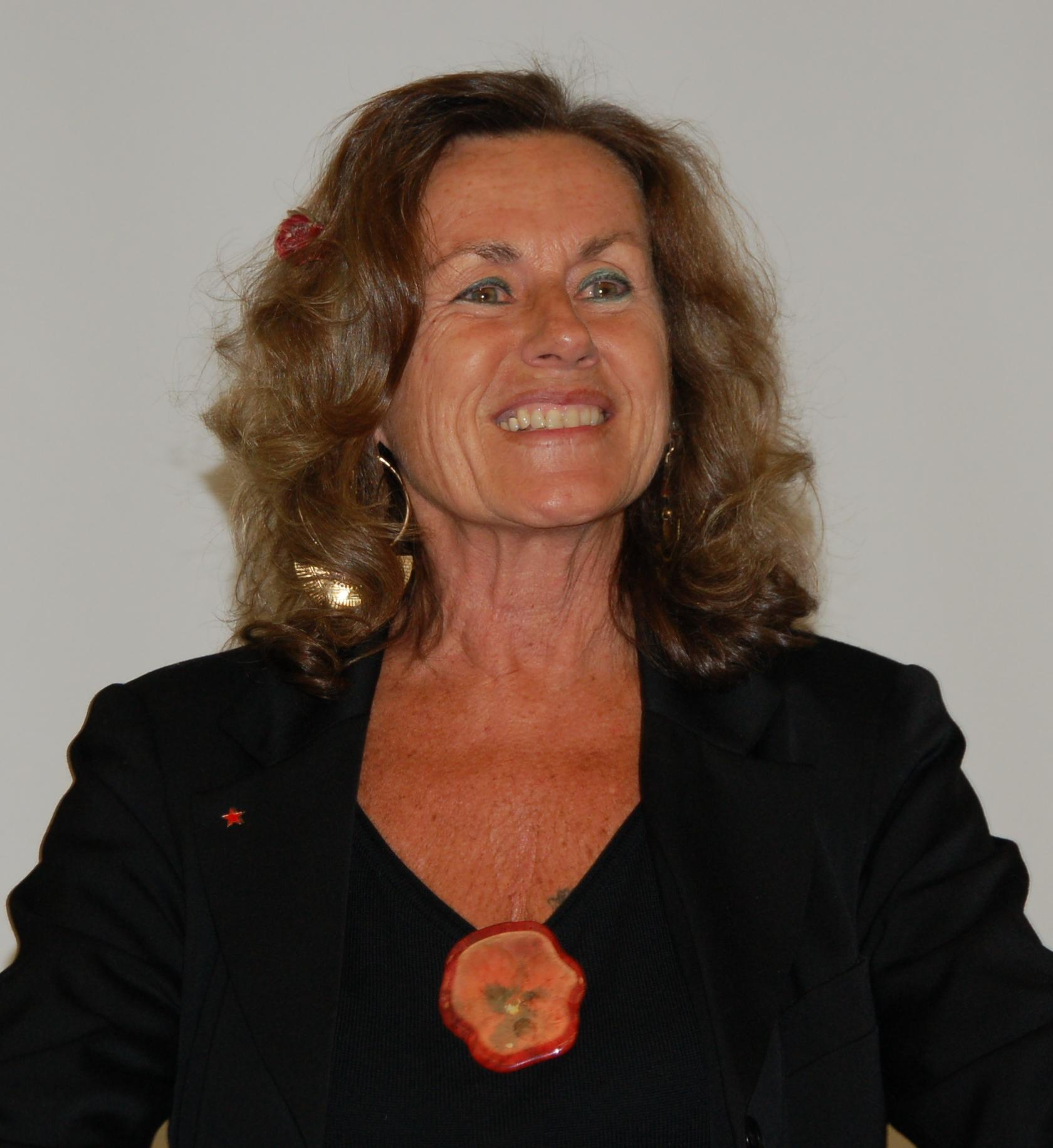
- Dohrn in 2007
- Born: Bernardine Rae Ohrnstein; January 12, 1942 (age 84); Chicago, Illinois, U.S.
- Education: University of Chicago (BA, JD)
- Known for: Leadership role in the Weather Underground
- Spouse: Bill Ayers
- Children: 3
- Relatives: Rachel DeWoskin (daughter-in-law)

Bernardine Rae Dohrn (née Ohrnstein; born January 12, 1942) is a retired American law professor and a former leader of the far-left militant organization Weather Underground in the United States. As a leader of the Weather Underground in the early 1970s, Dohrn was on the FBI's 10 Most Wanted list for several years. She remained a fugitive, even though she was removed from the list. After coming out of hiding in 1980, Dohrn pleaded guilty to misdemeanor charges of aggravated battery and bail jumping.

Dohrn had graduated from the University of Chicago Law School in 1967. During the 1980s, she was employed by the Sidley & Austin law firm. From 1991 to 2013, Dohrn was a Clinical Associate Professor of Law at the Children and Family Justice Center at Northwestern University School of Law. She is married to Bill Ayers, a co-founder of the Weather Underground.

== Early life ==
Bernardine Dohrn was born Bernardine Ohrnstein in Chicago, Illinois, in 1942, and moved to Whitefish Bay, an upper-middle-class suburb of Milwaukee as a young child, where she was raised the majority of her childhood. Her father, Bernard D. Ohrnstein, changed the family surname to Dohrn (the "D" for his wife, Dorothy, plus the first letters of his last name) when Bernardine was in high school. Her father was Jewish, which his name change was intended to obscure. Her mother, Dorothy (née Soderberg), was of Swedish background and a Christian Scientist. Dohrn graduated from Whitefish Bay High School, where she was a cheerleader, treasurer of the Modern Dance Club, a member of the National Honor Society, and editor of the school newspaper.

She attended Miami University in Oxford, Ohio, for one year before transferring to the University of Chicago, where she graduated with honors with a B.A. in political science in 1963. Dohrn received her J.D. from the University of Chicago Law School in 1967. While attending law school, Dohrn began working in support of civil rights movement leader Martin Luther King Jr. and became the first law student organizer for the National Lawyers Guild.

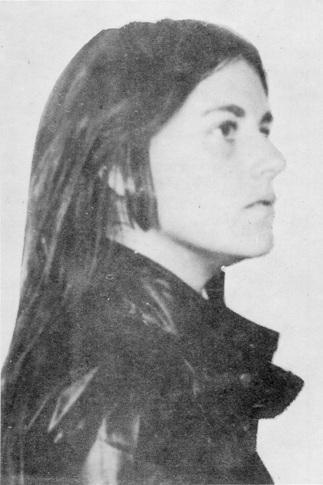
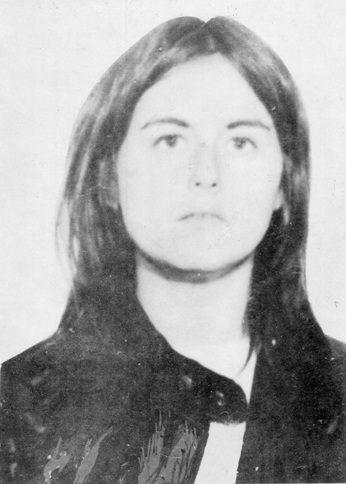
FBI most wanted mugshot for Bernardine Dohrn (1970)

== Activist career ==
=== Students for a Democratic Society involvement ===
Dohrn became one of the leaders of the Revolutionary Youth Movement (RYM), a radical wing of Students for a Democratic Society (SDS), in the late 1960s. Dohrn with ten other SDS members associated with the RYM issued, on June 18, 1969, a sixteen-thousand-word manifesto entitled "You Don't Need a Weatherman to Know Which Way the Wind Blows", in New Left Notes. The title came from Bob Dylan's song, "Subterranean Homesick Blues". The manifesto stated that "the goal [of revolution] is the destruction of US imperialism and the achievement of a classless world: world communism."

The manifesto concludes with the following:

The RYM must also lead to the effective organization needed to survive and to create another battlefield of the revolution. A revolution is a war; when the Movement in this country can defend itself militarily against total repression it will be part of the revolutionary war. This will require a cadre organization, effective secrecy, self-reliance among the cadres ...

The manifesto also asserted that African-Americans were a "black colony" within a U.S. government that was doomed to overextend itself. And the RYM was needed to quicken this process. Dohrn said, "The best thing that we can be doing for ourselves, as well as for the [Black] Panthers and the revolutionary black liberation struggle, is to build a fucking white revolutionary movement."

The ninth annual national SDS conference was held at the Chicago Coliseum on June 18–22, 1969, and the SDS collapsed in a Revolutionary Youth Movement-led upheaval. Soon after the Revolutionary Youth Movement became known as the Weathermen. Dohrn led the Weatherman faction in the SDS fight and continued to be a leader afterward. Larry Grathwohl, an FBI informant who was with the Weathermen from autumn 1969 through spring 1970, considered her one of the two top leaders of the organization, along with Bill Ayers. On May 26, 1968, as a speaker for the National Lawyers Guild, Dohrn said she was filing a motion in federal court asking for an injunction to halt any disciplinary action that was being taken against student activists and represented students from Columbia University who were striking and protesting. On June 14, 1968, Dohrn was elected the Inter-organizational Secretary of SDS, and, once elected, was asked if she was a socialist. She replied, "I consider myself a revolutionary communist." From August 30 to September 1, 1968, Dohrn visited Yugoslavia. Her involvement with SDS and political advocacy stretch beyond the United States as well, as she and other SDS leaders had met with representatives from North Vietnam and the National Liberation Front of South Vietnam in Budapest, Hungary to discuss peace talks. She and a delegation from the SDS also traveled to Cuba via Mexico City, Mexico on July 4, 1969, and later arrived in Canada via a Cuban vessel on August 16, 1969.

On the night of October 1, 1968, Dohrn spoke at a meeting in Chicago to condemn Chicago's Mayor Daley's orders to attack protesters during the 1968 Democratic National Convention. Then, from October 11 to 13, she and SDS held a national meeting at the University of Colorado Boulder wherein Dohrn was a speaker addressing concerns about where the movement was headed and what involvement they could expect as governmental tensions mounted and the student movement splintered into factions. On October 11, 1968, Dohrn suggested she would expand the movement to non-students and do all that was necessary to complete the job of "attack, expose, destroy." Dohrn continued to give speeches on behalf of SDS and Weather Underground and attend leadership conferences for both organizations. On January 29 and 30, 1969, in recognition of the tenth anniversary of the Cuban Revolution, the University of Washington held a Cuba teach-in where Dohrn was a speaker on campus. A month later at a press conference at the regional headquarters of SDS in Chicago, Dohrn spoke of the plans that were under way to "attack" college graduation ceremonies across the country, saying, "Our presence will be known at the graduation ceremonies where the big people will come as speakers." By that time, Dohrn was known as a National Interim Committee member of the SDS and a member of the Weatherman group.

=== Weather Underground involvement ===
The Weather Underground was a radical left militant organization responsible for bombings of the United States Capitol, the Pentagon, and several police stations in New York, as well as the Greenwich Village townhouse explosion that killed three of its members.

Dohrn was a principal signatory on the Weather Underground's "Declaration of a State of War" in May 1970 that formally declared "war" on the U.S. Government, and completed the group's transformation from political advocacy to violent action. She recorded the declaration and sent a transcript of a tape recording to The New York Times. Dohrn also co-wrote (with Bill Ayers) and published the subversive manifesto Prairie Fire in 1974 and participated in the covertly filmed Underground in 1976. In late 1975, the Weather Underground put out an issue of a magazine, Osawatomie, which carried an article by Dohrn entitled "Our Class Struggle"; the article was described as a speech given to the organization's cadres on September 2 of that year. In the article, Dohrn clearly stated support for communist ideology:

We are building a communist organization to be part of the forces which build a revolutionary communist party to lead the working class to seize power and build socialism. ... We must further the study of Marxism-Leninism within the WUO [Weather Underground Organization]. The struggle for Marxism-Leninism is the most significant development in our recent history. ... We discovered thru our own experiences what revolutionaries all over the world have found — that Marxism-Leninism is the science of revolution, the revolutionary ideology of the working class, our guide to the struggle ...

According to a 1974 FBI study of the group, Dohrn's article signaled a developing commitment to Marxism-Leninism that had not been clear in the group's previous statements, despite their trips to Cuba and contact with Vietnamese communists there.

=== Statements about Tate-LaBianca murders ===
Dohrn was criticized for comments she made about the murders of actress Sharon Tate and retail store owners Leno and Rosemary LaBianca by the Charles Manson clan. In a speech during the December 1969 "War Council" meeting organized by the Weathermen, attended by about 400 people in Flint, Michigan, Dohrn said, "First they killed those pigs, then they ate dinner in the same room with them, then they even shoved a fork into the pig Tate's stomach! Wild!" In greeting each other, delegates to the war council often spread their fingers to signify the fork.

== Arrests and trials ==
On August 22, 1969, Dohrn was arrested in Chicago and charged with possession of drugs. The defense argued that Chicago Police had conducted an illegal search of the car in which she was a passenger, which led Judge Kenneth R. Wendt of the Narcotics Court of Chicago to dismiss the charges. On September 20, 1969, at an anti-Vietnam War rally at the Davis Cup tennis tournament in Cleveland, police arrested Dohrn and twenty other persons on charges of disorderly conduct. On September 26, 1969, Dohrn was arrested again in Chicago during a rally in support of the eight men accused of conspiracy concerning protests during the 1968 Democratic National Convention, who were on trial for riot conspiracy charges. Dohrn was next arrested on October 9, 1969, by the Chicago police during a rally for the women's faction of the Weathermen group and was later released on a $1,000 bond. On October 31, 1969, a grand jury indicted 22 people, including Dohrn, for their involvement with the trial of the Chicago Eight, and she was again indicted on April 2, 1970, when a Federal Grand Jury indicted twelve members of the Weatherman group on conspiracy charges in violation of anti-riot acts during the "Days of Rage." However, all of these convictions were reversed on November 21, 1972, by the United States Court of Appeals for the Seventh Circuit on the basis the judge was biased in his refusal to permit defense attorneys to screen prospective jurors for cultural and racial bias.

Due to the increasing volatility of the Weather Underground led by Dohrn, on October 14, 1970, Dohrn was added to the Federal Bureau of Investigation's Ten Most Wanted Fugitives list. She was removed in December 1973, after District Court Judge Damon Keith dismissed the case against the Weathermen. That dismissal was followed shortly by another, when, on January 3, 1974, Judge Julius Hoffman dismissed a 4-year-old case against twelve members of the Weatherman faction of the Students for a Democratic Society, including Dohrn. She had been charged with leading the riotous "Days of Rage".

=== Coming out of hiding ===
While on the run from police, Dohrn used many aliases (including Bernardine Rae Ohrnstein, H. T. Smith, and Marion Delgado) and married another Weatherman leader, Bill Ayers, with whom she has two children. During the last years of their underground life, Dohrn and Ayers resided in Chicago, where they used the aliases Christine Louise Douglas and Anthony J. Lee. In the late 1970s, the Weatherman group split into two factions, the "May 19 Coalition" and the "Prairie Fire Collective", with Dohrn and Ayers in the latter. The Prairie Fire Collective favored coming out of hiding, with members facing the criminal charges against them, while the May 19 Coalition remained in hiding. A decisive factor in Dohrn's decision to come out of hiding were her concerns about her children.

The couple turned themselves in to authorities in 1980. While some charges relating to their activities with the Weathermen were dropped due to prosecutorial misconduct (see COINTELPRO), Dohrn pleaded guilty to misdemeanor charges of aggravated battery and bail jumping for which she was put on probation. After refusing to testify against ex-Weatherman Susan Rosenberg in an armed robbery case, Dohrn was held in contempt of a grand jury and served seven months in prison. Shortly after turning themselves in, Dohrn and Ayers became legal guardians of future San Francisco District Attorney Chesa Boudin, the son of former members of the Weather Underground Kathy Boudin and David Gilbert, after the couple were convicted of murder for their roles in a 1981 armored car robbery.

== Later life and professional career ==
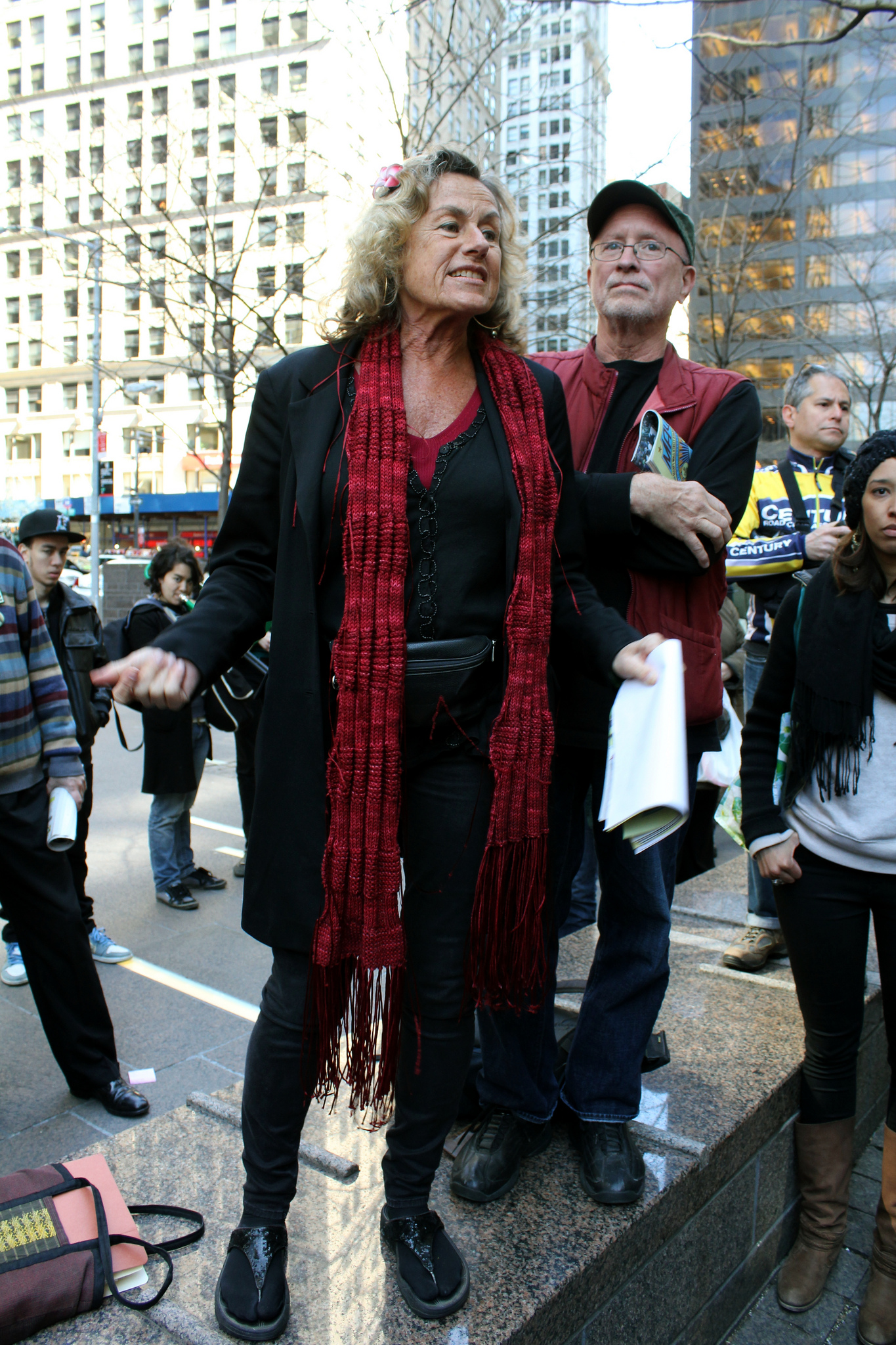
Bernardine Dohrn and Bill Ayers in Occupy Wall Street, Zuccotti Park, 2012

From 1984 to 1988, Dohrn was employed by the Chicago law firm Sidley Austin, where she was hired by Howard Trienens, the head of the firm, who knew Thomas G. Ayers, Dohrn's father-in-law. "We often hire friends," Trienens told a reporter for the Chicago Tribune. However, Dohrn had not been admitted to the New York or Illinois bar even though she had passed both bar exams; she did not submit an application to the New York Supreme Court's Committee on Character and Fitness, and she was turned down by the Illinois ethics committee because of her criminal record. Trienens said of the Illinois rejection, "Dohrn didn't get a [law] license because she's stubborn. She wouldn't say she's sorry."

In 1991, Dohrn was hired by Northwestern University School of Law as an adjunct professor. Her title was "Clinical Associate Professor of Law". She was one of the founders of the Children and Family Justice Center in the Bluhm Legal Clinic at Northwestern Law. Because Dohrn was hired as an adjunct (a temporary assignment), her appointment did not require faculty approval. When law school officials were asked whether or not the dean or the board of trustees approved the hiring, the school responded as follows: "While many would take issue with views Ms. Dohrn espoused during the 1960s, her career at the law school is an example of a person's ability to make a difference in the legal system." She retired from Northwestern Law in 2013.

=== Later politics ===
In 1994, Dohrn said, "I still see myself as a radical."

In 2008, Dohrn and Ayers resurfaced into news headlines as presidential candidate John McCain and his running mate Sarah Palin publicly denounced the ties between Ayers and then-presidential candidate Barack Obama.

In a November 4, 2010, interview, Dohrn described the political "right" in the U.S. as racist, armed, hostile, and "unspeakable". Referring to the August 28, 2010 Restoring Honor rally which was promoted by Glenn Beck and held at the Lincoln Memorial in Washington, D.C., Dorhn said, "You have white people armed, demanding the end to the [Obama] presidency." She has also asserted that "the real terrorist is the American government, state terrorism unleashed against the world."

Dohrn and Ayers were invited to the June 18, 2026, exclusive Grand Opening of the Obama Presidential Center in Chicago and reportedly seated in the third row.

=== Personal life and family ===
Dohrn's son Zayd Ayers Dohrn is married to actress and writer Rachel DeWoskin.

In 2022, Dohrn began experiencing memory loss and was subsequently diagnosed with Alzheimer's disease.

== See also ==
- List of Weatherman actions
- Weatherman Member List
- Fugitive Days (2001), Bill Ayers' memoir
- The Weather Underground (film), 2002 documentary
- Underground (1976 film), documentary
