= Restless (1998 film) =

- Film poster
- Directed by: Jule Gilfillan
- Written by: Jule Gilfillan; Peter Shiao
- Produced by: Peter Shiao; Lisa Onodera
- Starring: Catherine Kellner; David Wu; Chen Shiang-chyi; Geng Le
- Cinematography: Yang Shu
- Edited by: Folmer Wiesinger
- Music by: Laura Karpman
- Production companies: Celestial Pictures; Beijing Youth Film Studios
- Distributed by: Arrow Releasing
- Release dates: November 15, 1998 (Hawaii International Film Festival); November 3, 2000 (U.S.)
- Running time: 98 minutes
- Countries: United States; China
- Language: English
- Budget: $3 million

Restless is a 1998 romantic film directed and co-written by Jule Gilfillan, starring Catherine Kellner, David Wu, Chen Shiang-chyi and Geng Le. An American–Chinese co-production, the film was almost entirely shot and filmed in Beijing and follows two Americans who find love in China.

It was screened at multiple film festivals in 1998 and 1999 before receiving a limited theatrical release in the United States in 2000 and a DVD release on December 4, 2001. Restless was criticized for its clichéd and undelivered storylines, but praised for its scenery.

== Plot ==
Leah (Kellner) is a translator who is traveling international cities in search of romance and closure with her estranged boyfriend Jeff. She eventually settles in Beijing, China, where she meets and develops a fixation on Master Sun Zhan (Geng Le), who teaches here a Chinese game called weiqi. When her relationship with Master Sun Zhan takes a turn for the worse, Leah decides to focus on getting revenge on Jeff. Richard (Wu) is a shiftless Chinese-American whose family sends him to Beijing with his grandfather's ashes. Eventually Leah and Richard's paths cross.

== Cast ==
- Catherine Kellner as Leah Quinn, an American expat working for China Daily
- David Wu as Richard Kao, a second-generation Chinese-American
- Chen Shiang-chyi as Lin Qingqing
- Geng Le as Sun Zhan, a weiqi master with the rank of 8 dan
- Sarita Choudhury as Jane Talwani
- Josh Lucas as Jeff Hollingsworth, Leah's cheating boyfriend
- Matthew Faber as Ben Gold
- Rachel DeWoskin as Monica
- Chen Jianbin as "Guanxi"
- Fu Biao as Shen Gang, Lin Qingqing's suitor
- Hu Xin as Xiaoming, Leah's coworker and friend
- Elizabeth Sung as Richard's mother

== Production ==
Co-produced by Celestial Pictures and Beijing Youth Film Studios, Restless was filmed in Beijing at a cost of $3 million. The dialog was shot primarily in English, with approximately 20% spoken in Chinese. Through the film's title and story, producer and co-writer Peter Shiao wanted to "capture something that's unique to [the college] generation ... the need to go on the road and explore yourself, in the process of exploring the world." While the film highlights the cultural differences between America and China, Shiao notes that he was careful not to overly politicize the dialog, wanting to avoid both being seen as too critical of the Chinese government, and of being too politically correct.

He wanted the film to "test the viability of the Chinese market". Being co-produced with a Chinese company and under a profit-sharing film, Shiao felt the work could be distributed in China without the restrictions placed on other American films. He also felt it would aid diplomacy between the two countries after changes in China's handling of intellectual properties. He notes, however, that Chinese authorities would first have to approve the film, which "push[es] the envelope". It took a year of negotiations over "script approvals, actor selections and crew" for the co-production to be approved, but Shiao felt it was important that the film be viewable to both Chinese and American audiences.

== Distribution ==
Restless was first screened at the Hawaii International Film Festival in November 1998. Additional screenings followed at Shown at Cinema Seattle/Women in Cinema Film Festival, held from January 29–February 4, 1999, the Cleveland International Film Festival in March 1999, and at the New York Women's Film Festival on April 22, 1999.

The film received a limited theatrical release in the United States, premiering in Los Angeles on November 3, 2000. It was later aired in San Francisco starting on January 19, 2001, and in New York City on January 26, 2001. It was released on Region 1 DVD by Arrow Releasing on December 4, 2001.

== Reception ==
By the end of its theatrical run on February 8, 2001, Restless had a gross earnings of $18,154 in the United States.

It received generally negative reviews from American film critics. At Metacritic, which assigns a rating out of 100 to reviews from mainstream critics, the film has received an average score of 39 based on 10 reviews. Ken Eisner of Variety thought the performances and script were good, and that the film would appeal to Mandarin-speaking areas of the world. Laura Kelly of the South Florida Sun-Sentinel drew comparisons to Sex and the City, but called Restless "less smart and less overtly sexual". She also called the film clichéd and noted that its parallel storylines expressed redundant themes. Dennis Lim of The Village Voice noted that Gilfillan relies on "rote culture-clash pratfalls" and fails to deliver on any of its promised storylines. Several critics noted the good use of Beijing scenery, and that Restless exposes some settings in Beijing that viewers might not otherwise see.

== Soundtrack ==
- "Restless" by Faye Wong — opening song
