= Jeff Jones (activist) =

American activist (born 1947)

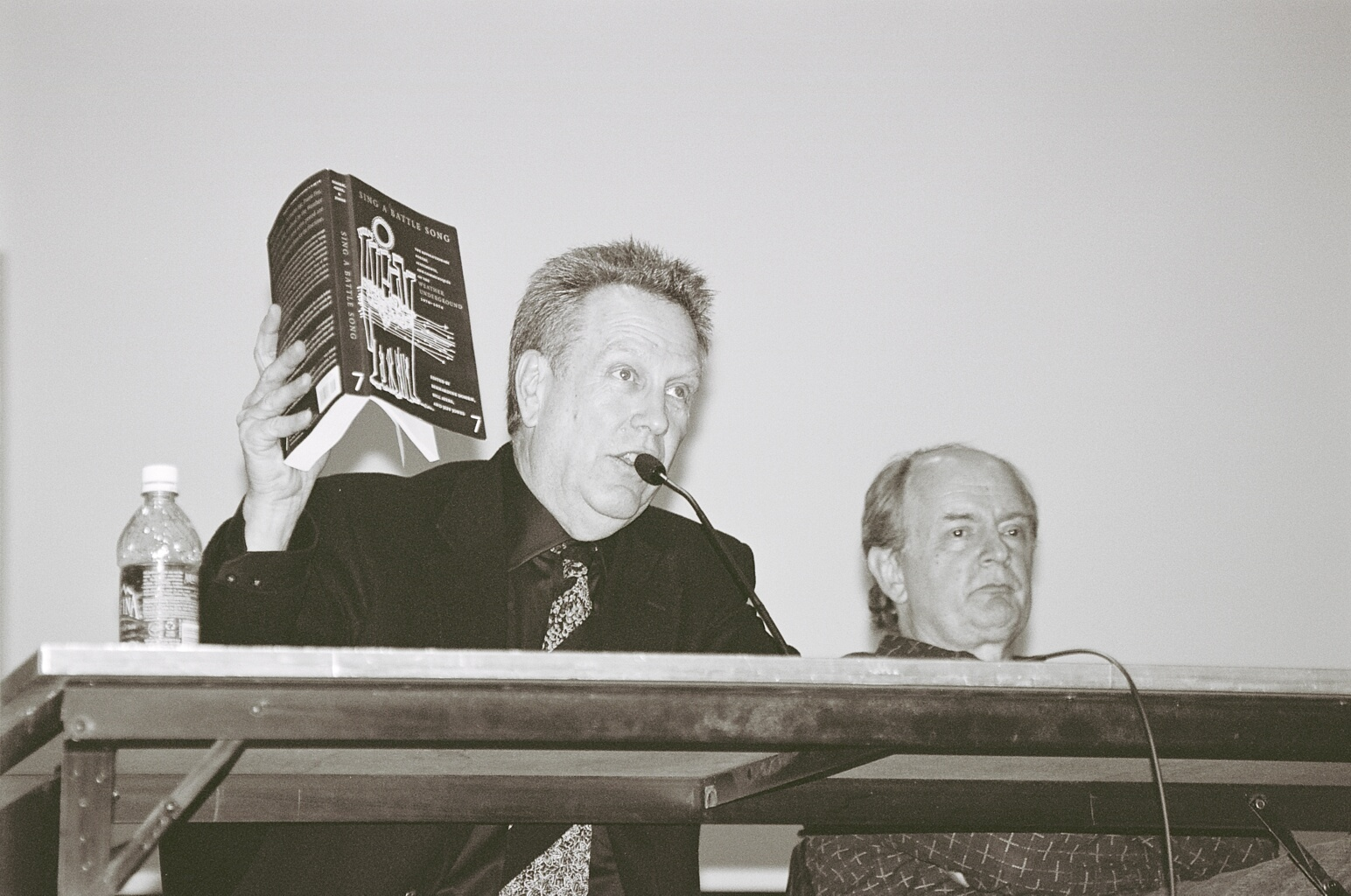
- Jones speaking at City University of New York (2007)
- Born: Jeffrey Carl Jones; February 23, 1947 (age 79); Philadelphia, Pennsylvania, U.S.
- Known for: Student activist Students for a Democratic Society leader Weather Underground leader

Jeff Jones (born February 23, 1947) is an environmental activist and consultant in Upstate New York. He was a national officer in Students for a Democratic Society, a founding member of Weatherman, and a leader of the Weather Underground.

== Early life and background ==
Jeffrey Carl "Jeff" Jones, the first child of Albert and Millie Jones, was born February 23, 1947, in Philadelphia, Pennsylvania. Four years later, the expanding Jones family moved to the Los Angeles San Fernando Valley, and his father eventually settled into a career at the Walt Disney Company in 1954. Having a father who worked for Disney enhanced young Jones's popularity among his peers; with home screenings of the latest Mickey Mouse cartoons, a featured event at his birthday parties.

During World War II, his father, a pacifist and conscientious objector, was assigned for the duration of the war, to a civilian work camp in the Sierra Nevada, California. When his church abandoned him for not serving in the military, the Quakers in the camp embraced him, and he later immersed his family in their traditional ways. Uniforms in the Jones home (Boy Scouts, etc.) were not permitted; the YMCA would have to suffice. This minor restriction was no impediment, as young Jones (hereafter, Jones) excelled in academics, cross country, and school politics (he was the student body president of his high school).

== From SDS to Weatherman ==
By mid-June 1969, SDS held what would turn out to be its final convention. Previous efforts/tactics to bring the war to an end and factional disputes over the organization's goals and direction allowed an influential and militant bloc of SDS' hierarchy to seize control of the body. Building on their earlier support for the Black Liberation Movement in the United States and the Vietnamese, the Weatherman faction at the convention issued a statement calling for a revolution in this nation to fight and defeat U.S. imperialism within, and outside the country. Emerging from the fractious convention, Jeff Jones, Bill Ayers, and Mark Rudd, all signatories to what came to be known as the Weatherman statement, constituted the organization's new leadership group.

Jones worked throughout the rest of the summer following the convention to promote and organize a demonstration in Oct. 1969 to coincide with the Chicago Seven trial and the second anniversary of the death of Che Guevara. "Bring the War Home" was the slogan for the Chicago march, and despite far fewer demonstrators than anticipated, Jones "figured they were the right ones, the vanguard." Jones evoked the memory of Marion Delgado, a five-year-old boy who put a slab of concrete on a railroad track and derailed a passenger train, reinforcing the potential damage that the small can inflict on the powerful. Proclaiming himself to be the embodiment of Marion Delgado, Jones announced to the crowd the as yet stated target of their wrath, and the small army filed out of the park where they were staged and embarked on a violent rampage that came to be known as the Days of Rage. (The violence amounted to smashing windows, damaging cars, and clashes with police.)

News article San Antonio Express And News October 25, 1969, page 2: "Militant SDS Group Nabbed in Park Raid. OREGON, ILL. (AP) - Police raided three cabins at White Pines State Park Thursday night and turned up some top leaders of the militant Weatherman faction of the Students for a Democratic Society. Two persons were arrested—Jeffrey C. Jones, 22, SDS Interorganizational Secretary from Sylmar, Calif., and Linda Sue Evans, 22, of Ann Arbor, Mich. Among others questioned and released were Mark W. Rudd, 22, National SDS Secretary from Maplewood, N.J.; Bernardine Dohrn, 27, former Iinterorganizational Secretary from Chicago; and William C. Ayers, 24, of Ann Arbor, SDS Educational Secretary. Jones was charged with possession of a deadly weapon—a blackjack—and released on $1,000 bond. Police said Jones is at liberty on $10,000 bond on an aggravated assault charge in Du Page County. Miss Evans was accused of auto theft after authorities said she had not returned a rented automobile on time. Police dropped the charge, however, on learning the renter would not sign a complaint."

== Underground ==
Jones and about a hundred others were arrested for their roles in an event that caused considerable damage to not only the city, but also to Weatherman's image among some previous sympathizers on the left. Chicago Black Panther Party leader Fred Hampton, who had a mostly friendly relationship with Weatherman, denounced the group's action, fearing it would alienate potential allies and invite an escalation of police oppression. Ironically, it was the killing of Hampton by the Chicago police less than two months after the "Days of Rage" that cemented in the mind of Weatherman that it was time to move underground and take up armed struggle.

Jones and other Weathermen failed to appear for their March 1970 court date to face charges of "crossing state lines to foment a riot and conspiring to do so". "Unlawful flight to avoid prosecution" charges were added when they failed to show up. The Greenwich Village townhouse explosion earlier in the month claimed the lives of Weather members Ted Gold, Diana Oughton, and Terry Robbins. With the destructive capacity of Weatherman fully realized, the FBI launched an intensive manhunt to round up the members of the organization, including Jeff Jones.

In the aftermath of the townhouse explosion, members of the Weatherman leadership gathered on the coast of California to discuss the incident and its implications. Initially, the bomb was intended for a military dance at Fort Dix, New Jersey, but the catastrophic outcome apparently forced the leaders to reassess the wisdom of targeting humans. After a lot of heated debate, the considerable influence of Jones and Bernardine Dohrn moved the organization away from attacking civilian targets and toward symbols of American power (buildings, etc.).

We were very careful from the moment of the townhouse on to be sure we weren't going to hurt anybody, and we never did hurt anybody. Whenever we put a bomb in a public space, we had figured out all kinds of ways to put checks and balances on the thing and also to get people away from it, and we were remarkably successful.

— Bill Ayers

In the early stages of his life on the lam, Jones lived for over a year in San Francisco with fellow-fugitive Dohrn. In this time, at least one bombing claimed by Weatherman went off in their locale (Presidio Army base). Although neither the aforementioned bombing, nor any claimed by Weatherman, can be attributed to any one member of the group, Jones's name is listed on a roster of issuers of communiqués that were customary before or after one of the organization's major actions.

Jones left California for the East Coast in 1971, with passenger and fellow Weatherman, Eleanor Raskin. Over a time they became a couple and settled down in the Catskill Mountains to establish a new network there. In the years to come, they lived in New Jersey and in the Bronx, New York. Because of the secretive nature of the group, by now known as the Weather Underground Organization (WUO), specifics of what members did and where they were at all times are extremely hard to come by.

However, in his time underground, Jones was part of a collaborative WUO effort that wrote and published a book entitled Prairie Fire, of which 40,000 copies were printed and distributed. The book was a way in which the WUO could reach out and forge unity with progressive activists aboveground as well as advocate, with its doctrinal content, for the creation of a communist party. Inspired by reading Prairie Fire, radical filmmaker Emile de Antonio made a documentary about the WUO called Underground. Made in secrecy with Jones and four other members of the organization, the film was another vehicle for the WUO to communicate with potential supporters of their causes. In an effort to gather information on the group, the FBI harassed de Antonio relentlessly, and subsided only when Hollywood celebrities and prominent lawyers intervened on his behalf.

== Arrest and life since ==
Jeff Jones had felt as early as 1975 that the underground had run its course and it was time to consider resurfacing, but supported those who chose to remain there. He essentially believed that the time for armed acts was over. However, Jones would not surface until late October 1981, when he was unexpectedly caught up in a police sweep of individuals suspected of participating in the deadly robbery of an armored truck. A SWAT team arrested Jones and Raskin, and allowed a friend to take custody of their four-year-old son. In December 1981, a week before the couples' sentencing, they were married legally. At sentencing Jones received probation and community service, while the charges against his wife were dismissed.

In the years after he gained his full freedom, Jones has worked as a reporter and editor covering New York State politics and policy. He was a communications director for ten years at Environmental Advocates of New York. He now heads up his own consulting firm called Jeff Jones Strategies that specializes in media expertise, writing, and campaign strategies that help grassroots and progressive groups achieve their goals. Jones is also working on the board of the financial arm of Movement for a Democratic Society (MDS), a group that works closely with the new SDS. He lives in Albany, New York with his wife and has two sons. He is a member of the Apollo Alliance.

== Further reading and viewing ==
- Dohrn, Bernadine, William Ayers, and Jeff Jones. Sing a Battle Song: The Revolutionary Poetry, Statements, and Communiqués of the Weather Underground, 1970-1974.
  Seven Stories Press: New York, 2006. This book contains an introduction by Jones that elaborates on his revolutionary anti-imperialist ideology and commitment to environmentalism. The book also contains the collaborative writings of the Weather Underground that Jones participated in crafting.
- Jones, Thai. A Radical Line: From the Labor Movement to the Weather Underground, One Family's Century of Conscience. Free Press: New York, New York, 2004.
  The author of this book is the now grownup four-year-old that was present at the 1981 arrest of his parents, Weather Underground Organization members Jeff Jones and Eleanor Raskin. Born into the underground without knowledge of his real name, Thai Jones the author and adult, invites his readers through a well sourced window into the activism and ideological leanings of his historically significant family.
- Morrison, Joan and Robert K. Morrison. From Camelot to Kent State: The Sixties Experience in the Words of Those Who Lived It. Times Books: New York, New York, 1987.
  As the title suggests, the book focuses on the volatile 1960s and has a chapter dedicated to Jeff Jones in it. Jones describes his evolution as an activist.
- Rebels with a Cause. Dir. Helen Garvy. Zeitgeist Films, 2000.
  Because Jones was a member of the Students for a Democratic Society, this documentary will introduce viewers to the growth of the organization and its eventual demise.
- The Weather Underground. Dirs. Sam Green and Bill Siegel. The Free History Project, 2002.
  This documentary features interviews with members of the Weather Underground Organization (WUO) spliced with news footage of the Vietnam War, demonstrations, WUO actions, and the authorities attempt to suppress dissent and capture fugitive members of the group. It also includes the voices of those who supported the WUO, as well as some harsh criticism of the group. Archival video footage of Jeff Jones is featured in the documentary.
- Underground. Dirs. Emile De Antonio and Mary Lampson. Turin Film Corp., 1974.
  Jeff Jones and four fellow WUO members are featured in this documentary shot while the cast members were wanted fugitives. Shot at great risk to the filmmakers and WUO members, the documentary exposes viewers to the group's ideology and its unique ability to deliver its message to audiences aboveground.
- On Anarchism: Dispatches From The Peoples' Republic of Vermont, foreword by Jeff Jones, Authored by David Van Deusen (co-founder of the Green Mountain Anarchist Collective), Algora Publishing, 2017, ISBN 978-1-62894-303-0.
