= Foreign Babes in Beijing =

Television series

- Author: Rachel DeWoskin
- Language: English
- Publication date: 2005

Foreign Babes in Beijing, subtitled Behind the Scenes of a New China, is a memoir published in 2005 by Rachel DeWoskin. The memoir details the author's personal experiences in Beijing from 1994 through 1999, during which time she lived in Beijing and watched the city grow and change as China modernized its economy.

The book's title is a reference to a soap opera in which DeWoskin appeared, Foreign Babes in Beijing (Chinese: 洋妞在北京, Yáng niū zài Běijīng), which features two pairs of Chinese men and American women. One pair features Rachel playing Jiexi, a seductress who lures away her married counterpart, Li Tianming; and the other features a more demure and traditional exchange student who falls in love with, and marries, Li Tianming's younger brother. Foreign Babes in Beijing was something of a cultural phenomenon in China, with a viewership of 600 million.

The memoir follows DeWoskin's life as well as her character's plotline, and has an attention to detail and cultural analysis which she inherited from her father, Kenneth DeWoskin, who was a noted Sinologist at the University of Michigan.
