= The Magic Crane =

1993 Hong Kong film by Benny Chan

- Film poster
- 新仙鶴神針
- Directed by: Benny Chan
- Screenplay by: Tsui Hark; Tsui Tak-cho
- Based on: Xian He Shen Zhen by Wolong Sheng
- Produced by: Tsui Hark
- Starring: Tony Leung; Anita Mui; Rosamund Kwan; Damian Lau
- Cinematography: Tony Miu; Tom Lau; Ko Chiu-lam
- Edited by: Marco Mak
- Music by: Johnathan Wong
- Production companies: Film Workshop; Longsheng Pictures
- Distributed by: Newport Entertainment
- Release date: 19 August 1993
- Running time: 96 minutes
- Country: Hong Kong
- Language: Cantonese
- Box office: HK$8,159,384

The Magic Crane (新仙鶴神針) is a 1993 Hong Kong wuxia film adapted from the novel Xian He Shen Zhen by Wolong Sheng. It was directed by Benny Chan and produced by Tsui Hark, starring Tony Leung, Anita Mui and Rosamund Kwan.

== Synopsis ==
Cao Xiong, the chief of the 18 Riders of Yanyun, calls for a wulin gathering and invites every martial arts clan to attend. Yiyangzi and Ma Junwu, a master–apprentice duo of the Diancang Clan, travel to the gathering. Along the way, Ma meets and starts a romantic relationship with Bai Yunfei, who rides a large crane. At the gathering, Su Penghai, the evil leader of the Tianlong Clan, plots with his sister Yuxiao Xianzi to release venomous bats to attack the other clans and force them to submit to him. Although the bats are driven away by Bai's crane, the other clans have suffered heavy casualties.

To save everyone, Ma and Bai ride the crane in search of a cure. Just as they find it, it is stolen by Lan Xiaodie, who reveals her past feud with Bai. Years ago, Lan's father Lan Haiping had neglected his wife and daughter to help Bai, a former princess. Lan's mother had died in frustration, causing Lan to blame her father and Bai for her plight. Lan and Bai fight and injure each other; Ma manages to seize the cure and escape with Bai.

Back at the gathering, everyone accuses Cao Xiong of being in cahoots with the Tianlong Clan. When Yiyangzi steps up to help Cao, the latter turns against him instead. Meanwhile, the younger members of the various clans scheme to seize their clans' leadership positions from the older generations. Bai gives Ma a manual with instructions on how to heal the wounded, but that incurs the jealousy of Cao and the others, who attack Ma and Yiyangzi to rob them of the manual. Ma and Yiyangzi each take half of the manual and flee, but Cao manages to snatch one half but falls off a cliff. Cao survives the fall and learns the skill in the manual, swearing to take revenge on those who wronged him.

Lan Haiping meets Bai and tells her the truth about their past. Later, he falls off a cliff and dies while trying to save Lan Xiaodie. Meanwhile, Cao Xiong returns to the wulin gathering and kills Su Penghai and Yuxiao Xianzi. Lan accidentally consumes aphrodisiac given to her by Cao, and ends up having sex with Ma after escaping. Bai and Lan agree to a fight to the death, but their fight is interrupted by Cao, who defeats both of them.

Yiyangzi buries half of the manual with Lan Haiping. Under heavy rain, the manual disintegrates and gets absorbed into Lan Haiping's body, resurrecting him. Lan Haiping, Yiyangzi and Ma return to save Bai and Lan Xiaodie, and they join forces to fight Cao Xiong. Bai and Cao are both lost during the fight. In the end, Ma comes to an agreement with Lan Xiaodie and her father that he will marry both Lan and Bai as his wives. In return, the Lans will help him find the missing Bai. Ma and Yiyangzi then carry the flag of the leader of the wulin and discuss whether to sell it for money.

== Cast ==
- Anita Mui as Bai Yunfei
- Tony Leung as Ma Junwu
- Rosamund Kwan as Lan Xiaodie
- Damian Lau as Yiyangzi
- Lawrence Ng as Su Penghai
- Norman Chui as Lan Haiping
- Zhang Tielin as Cao Xiong
- Jay Lau as Yuxiao Xianzi

== Music ==
The theme song "The Magic Crane" (新仙鶴神針) was composed by Ng Tai-kong with the lyrics by Lily Ho, and sung by Anita Mui and Jacky Cheung. The insert song "Proudness" (傲) was composed by James Wong with the lyrics by Mark Lui, and sung by Winnie Hsin.

== Box office ==
This film grossed HK$8,159,384 at the Hong Kong box office in its theatrical run from 19 August to 2 September 1993.

== Reception ==
The film review website City on Fire gave The Magic Crane a rating of 6/10, criticising its lack of structure and motives, while praising its practical effects and fight choreography. "While there's not much on display to separate it from the rest of its energetically paced peers of the era, (...) there's still plenty to enjoy, and the action comes thick and fast."
