= Osawatomie (periodical) =

Weather Underground magazine

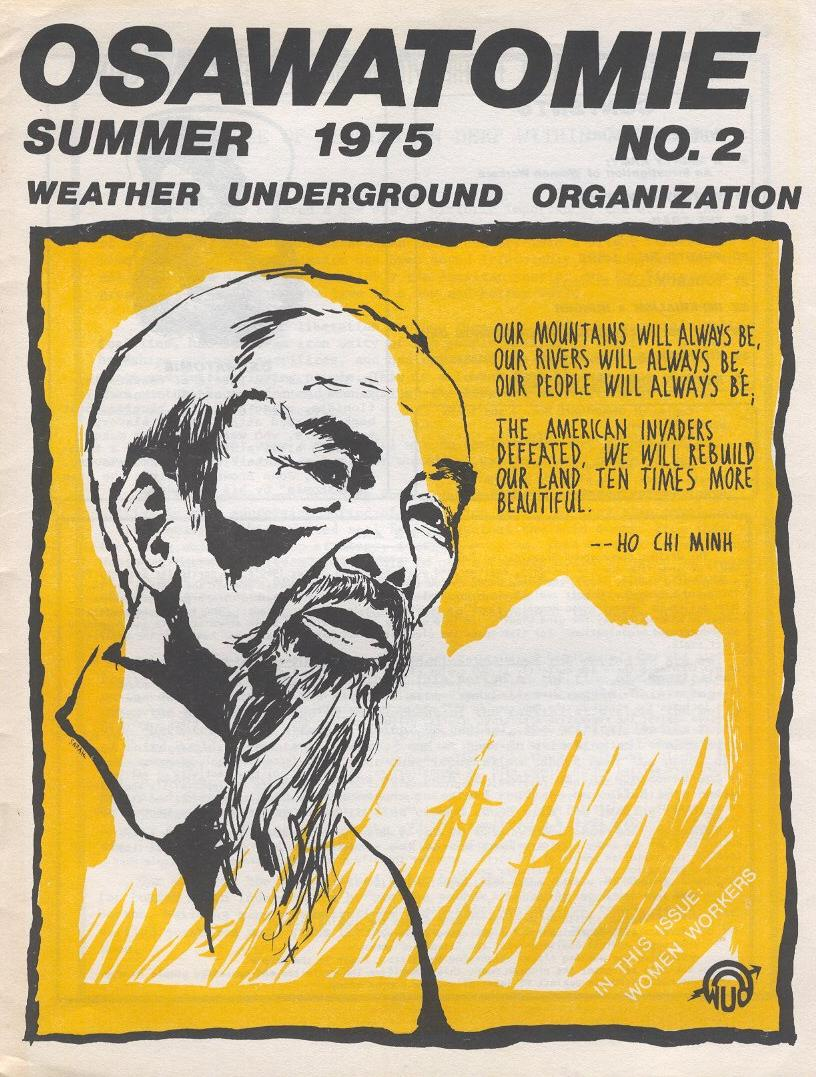
Osawatomie (periodical)

Osawatomie was a magazine published by the Weather Underground Organization (WUO), beginning in March 1975 and continuing for six issues until the June–July 1976 issue. It was started as a quarterly publication, but from the April/May 1976 issue its frequency became bimonthly. The magazine was based in Boston.

== Background ==
After the publication of Prairie Fire: the Politics of Revolutionary Anti-imperialism, the Weather Underground Organization (WUO) continued to establish a media presence by publishing a quarterly magazine entitled Osawatomie. Osawatomie debuted in March 1975 and gave the WUO an outlet to solidify the organization, its purpose, and its politics. It was also the WUO's attempt to establish the organization in a position of leadership of the New Left. The magazine was named Osawatomie in honor of John Brown, a white abolitionist who, in 1856 in Osawatomie, Kansas, led a small group of anti-slavery forces in an armed fight to prevent the state of Kansas from becoming a slave state and with whom the WUO is symbolically linked through the tradition of militant white anti-racism.

== Description and history ==
Each issue of Osawatomie included editorials, book reviews, a "Toolbox" section in which certain communist ideas were explained in everyday language, and news about other anti-imperialist struggles around the world. Each issue also included a "Who We Are" section which gave a brief history of the WUO in which the Organization claimed responsibility for "over 25 armed actions against the enemy," in this case, the U.S. Government. The "Who We Are" section also outlined the five key points of the WUO program which included eliminating U.S. imperialism from the Third World; peace, by opposing "imperialist war and U.S. intervention;" fighting racism by building an anti-racist base among the working class and supporting self-determination for oppressed peoples; struggling for freedom of women against sexism; and fighting for socialism by organizing the working class.

After the completion of Prairie Fire: The Politics of Revolutionary Anti-imperialism, the Organization established a larger print shop in Boston which included a darkroom and plate-making facilities. Like Prairie Fire, Osawatomie was printed clandestinely. Unlike the apartment print shop where Prairie Fire was printed, the Boston print shop was out in the open. To prevent the neighbors from discovering the true nature of the print shop, they were told that the business was a small travel agency that had their own press [this needs confirmation]. Each issue of the magazine was between 28 and 32 pages, cost between 25 and 50 cents (including postage), and was distributed to news organizations, activists, and subscribers. Once the initial distribution was completed, the Prairie Fire Organizing Committee would reprint the magazine for a wider circulation.

== Purpose ==
As a publication of the WUO, Osawatomie gave little attention to any of the bombings that were attributed to the Organization. While they were reported on, they were not given front-page status. Instead, the magazine focused on controversial issues central to the Left. Another focus of the magazine was that of organizing a mass movement as opposed to bombings of government buildings carried out by a select few.

For members of the WUO, Osawatomie was a magazine of conflicting viewpoints. For Bernardine Dohrn, the magazine was a way to reenergize the movement at large. For others, it was a significant shift in politics, moving the Organization away from Third World movements and focusing on communist populism. For some, the magazine brought up the question of why the organization was still underground. The production of the magazine was a way to do more than the bombings; however, some didn't see the need for it to be done underground. Publishing the magazine was far from the militant struggle against oppression that originally pushed the Organization underground. Others saw the magazine as speaking for certain members of the group instead of the group as a whole. By its sixth and final issue, Osawatomie mirrored the internal struggles of the WUO in its pages. The program points of the WUO as outlined in the "Who We Are" section shifted from struggle against anti-imperialism to that of class struggle and shifted from organizing other whites against anti-racism to organizing a multiracial working class. With the dissolution of the WUO, Osawatomie ceased publication.

== Magazine Content and Format ==
Osawatomie followed the same basic format for each issue and included several recurring sections.

=== Who We Are ===
Each issue of Osawatomie included a section titled "Who We Are" in which the Weather Underground Organization establishes its identity and describes what they are working towards. The section took up approximately one half of a page and included information from which the name Weather Underground Organization was derived; a line from the song "Subterranean Homesick Blues" by Bob Dylan which said, "You don't need a weatherman to know which way the wind blows." They also used this space to outline the program points for the Weather Underground Organization. They were listed as

- US imperialism out of the Third World.
- Peace. Oppose imperialist war and US Intervention
- Fight racism. Build an anti-racist base within the working class. Support self-determination for oppressed peoples.
- Struggle against sexism and for the freedom of women.
- Organize the working class. Fight for socialism. Power to the people.

This section in each issue concluded with this final sentence: "In a single sentence, the program means this: Mobilize the exploited and oppressed people to wage the class struggle against US Imperialism, the common enemy." Beginning with Vol. 1 No. 4, the first program point included a second sentence, "Independence for Puerto Rico." In Vol. 1 Nos. 2–4, the section was found on the second page of the magazine (the inside front cover). In Vol. 2, the section was relocated to Page 27, the inside back cover.

=== Where We Stand ===
In each issue, the magazine included a section called "Where We Stand" which detailed the politics of the Central Committee, the governing committee of the Weather Underground Organization. Some of the subjects covered in this section were anti-imperialism and the need to organize against it (Vol. 1. No. 2, Vol 2. No. 1 and Vol. 2 No. 2), Marxism–Leninism and how it led to the publishing of Prairie Fire (Vol. 1, No. 3), and the women's movement (Vol. 1 No.3). Each essay in this section was attributed to the Central Committee except for Vol. 1 No.3 in which a copy of a speech given by Bernardine Dohrn was reprinted and Vol 1. No. 3 which was also signed "Celia Sojourn for the Central Committee, WUO. Celia Sojourn is a pseudonym, but it is not known for whom (needs Berger reference).

=== Toolbox ===
Most issues included a "Toolbox" section in which terms central to Marxism–Leninism were explained in everyday language. Some of the terms discussed were class struggle (Vol 1. No.2), socialism (Vol 1. No. 3), surplus value (Vol. 1, No. 4) and self-determination (Vol. 2 No. 1).
