= Xiao Zhichu =

Chinese general (1897–1958)

- 蕭之楚
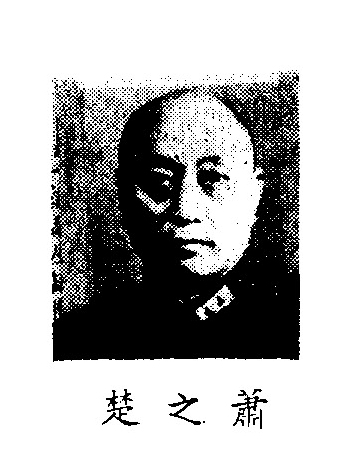
- Born: 5 March 1897; Lüling Town, Mudan District, Heze, Shandong, Qing dynasty
- Died: 23 February 1958 (aged 60); First Army General Hospital, Taipei, Taiwan
- Spouse: Chen Mannong
- Relatives: Shiao Yi (son); Stephanie Shiao (granddaughter)
- Military career
- Allegiance: Republic of China
- Service years: 1915–1949
- Rank: Lieutenant General (Zhongjiang)
- Unit: National Revolutionary Army
- Conflicts: Northern Expedition; Second Sino-Japanese War; Chinese Civil War

Chinese name
- Traditional Chinese: 蕭之楚
- Simplified Chinese: 萧之楚
Transcriptions
Standard Mandarin
- Hanyu Pinyin: Xiāo Zhīchǔ

Xiao Zhichu (Chinese: 蕭之楚; 5 March 1897 – 23 February 1958) was a Chinese general in the National Revolutionary Army of the Republic of China (ROC).

== Biography ==
Xiao was born in 1897 in Lüling Town of Mudan District in Heze, Shandong, to Xiao Yuli (Chinese: 蕭于澧), a peasant. His grandfather Xiao Jinfeng (Chinese: 蕭金峰) was a teacher at local old-style private school. In 1915, when he studied at Shandong No. 6 High school (now Heze No. 1 High School), he dropped out of school and enlisted in the army. In May 1923 he graduated from the Baoding Military Academy. In 1927 he participated in the Northern Expedition. The enemy of Chu Yupu (Chinese: 褚玉璞) were defeated and fled in disorder. From 1931 to 1934 he fought against the Red Army in Hubei, Hunan, Sichuan, and Shaanxi. During the Second Sino-Japanese War, he took part in the Battle of Shanghai, Battle of Wuhan, Battle of Zhejiang and Jiangxi, Battle of Sui-Zao, Battle of East Hubei, Battle of Yi-Sha, Battle of Changsha, Battle of Hengyang, and Battle of Gui-Liu successively. After the defeat of the Nationalists by the Communists in Chinese Civil War in June 1949, Xiao moved to Taiwan with his family. He died of illness at the First Army General Hospital in Taipei in 1958.

== Personal life ==
Xiao was twice married. His first wife was surnamed Wang. They had a son and a daughter. After she died of illness in 1931, Xiao married Chen Mannong (Chinese: 陳曼儂). They had five children.

His second son, Shiao Yi, was a Chinese American wuxia ("martial arts and chivalry") novelist. His granddaughter Xiao Qiang, also known as Stephanie Shiao, is an actress in Taiwan.

His former residence is well preserved.
