= Catherine Kellner =

American actress

- Born: October 2, 1970 (age 55); Manhattan, New York, U.S.
- Education: Vassar College (AB); New York University (MFA)
- Occupation: Actress
- Years active: 1987–present
- Spouse: Reuben Avery
- Children: 1

Catherine Kellner (born October 2, 1970) is an American character actress, perhaps best known for appearing in Daft Punk's music-video for their song Da Funk.

== Early life and education ==
Kellner was born and raised in New York City. She attended Vassar College, then New York University's Graduate Acting Program at the Tisch School of the Arts.

== Personal life ==
Kellner lives in Brooklyn.

Her parents are George and Martha Kellner, who, in May 1970, survived the crash of ALM Flight 980 in the Caribbean. Martha Kellner was pregnant with Catherine at the time.

== Filmography ==
=== Film ===
Year	Title	Role	Notes
1989	Eyewitness to Murder	Policewoman	
1993	Six Degrees of Separation	Tess	
1995	Open Season	Girl with Hat	
1995	Kicking and Screaming	Gail	
1996	MURDER and murder	Young Mildred	
1996	No Way Home	Denise	
1997	Rosewood	Fanny Taylor	
1997	Day at the Beach	Amy	
1997	Minotaur	Kim	
1997	Highball	Lolly	
1998	Restaurant	Nancy	
1998	Restless	Leah Quinn	
1999	200 Cigarettes	Hillary	
1999	30 Days	Lauren	
1999	Spring Forward	Dawn	
2000	Sleepwalk	Nina	
2000	D.A.F.T.	Beatrice	Da Funk (Music Video)
2000	Tully	April Reece	
2000	Shaft	Ivy	
2000	The Weight of Water	College Student	
2001	Pearl Harbor	Barbara	
2002	Outpatient	Dr. Patricia Farrow	
2003	Justice	Mara Seaver	
2004	The Grey	Lily Cantrell	
2005	Alchemy	Bride	
2005	Road	Margaret	
2007	Dedication	Abusive Mom	
2010	Golf in the Kingdom	Martha McKee	
2012	How to Score Your Life	Marcy	
2015	Sweets	Alex	
2019	Colewell	Claire	

=== Television ===
Year	Title	Role	Notes
1987	As the World Turns	Kathy Evans	5 episodes
1996	Harvest of Fire	Nancy	Television film
1996	High Incident	Officer Gayle Van Camp	11 episodes
2001	Law & Order	Celia Goddard	Episode: "Phobia"
2004	Hack	Molly	Episode: "Misty Blue"
2005	Angel Rodriguez	Heather	Television film
2006	Law & Order: Criminal Intent	Mimi	Episode: "Dramma Giocoso"
