= Rachel DeWoskin =

American actress and author (born 1972)

- Born: 1972 (age 53–54); Kyoto, Japan
- Education: Columbia University (BA); Boston University (MFA)
- Occupations: Writer, actress
- Employer: University of Chicago
- Known for: starring in Foreign Babes in Beijing
- Spouse: Zayd Ayers Dohrn
- Children: 2
- Relatives: Bernardine Dohrn (mother-in-law); Bill Ayers (father-in-law); Chesa Boudin (brother-in-law)
- Awards: Alex Awards (2012)

Rachel DeWoskin (born 1972, Kyoto, Japan) is an American actress and author who is a 2012 recipient of the Alex Awards. As of June 2022 she was an associate professor of creative writing at the University of Chicago.

== Early life and education ==
DeWoskin was raised in Ann Arbor, Michigan, where she attended the alternative Community High School. The daughter of Kenneth DeWoskin, a Sinology professor at the University of Michigan and senior advisor to Deloitte, she majored in English and studied Chinese at Columbia University, graduating in 1994.

== Career ==
=== Acting ===
She went to Beijing in 1994 to work as a public-relations consultant and later starred in a Chinese nighttime soap opera, the hugely successful Foreign Babes in Beijing, which was watched by approximately 600 million viewers. DeWoskin played the character of Jiexi. As Reuters noted, the show was a "sort of Chinese counterpart to Sex and the City revolving around Chinese-Western culture clashes." At the time, she was one of the few foreign actresses working in mainland China and was considered a sex symbol.

=== Writing ===
DeWoskin returned to the United States in 1999 and earned a master's degree in poetry from Boston University. In 2005, W. W. Norton published her memoir, Foreign Babes in Beijing: Behind the Scenes of a New China. The New Yorker commented that "DeWoskin's cleverly layered account thus charts parallel culture clashes, one that she experiences as a Western woman in modern China, and the other, a TV-ready version of the first, tailored to Chinese expectations." Paramount Pictures purchased the film rights, and the project remains in production. The director and screen adaptor attached to the film is Alice Wu.

DeWoskin is also the author of five novels, Big Girl Small (Farrar, Straus and Giroux 2011), Repeat After Me (Overlook 2009), Blind (Penguin 2014), Some Day We Will Fly (Viking 2019) and Banshee (Dottir 2019).

== Personal life ==
DeWoskin is married to playwright Zayd Dohrn, son of Bernardine Dohrn and William Ayers. They have two daughters.
