= Thomas G. Ayers =

American philanthropist (1915–2007)

- Born: February 16, 1915; Detroit, Michigan
- Died: June 8, 2007 (aged 92); Chicago, Illinois
- Occupation: Businessman
- Organisation: Commonwealth Edison
- Title: President (1964-1980); CEO & Chairman (1973-1980)
- Spouse: Mary Andrew (m. 1938; died 2000)
- Children: William Ayers; John Ayers
- Parents: Jule Caesar Ayers (father); Camilla S. Chalmers (mother)

Thomas G. Ayers (February 16, 1915, in Detroit, Michigan – June 8, 2007, in Chicago, Illinois) was president (1964–1980), CEO and chairman (1973–1980) of Commonwealth Edison.

Ayers served as chairman of the Board of Trustees of Northwestern University, the Erikson Institute, the Bank Street College of Education in New York City, the Chicago Symphony Orchestra, the Chicago Community Trust, the Chicago Urban League, the Community Renewal Society, the Chicago Association of Commerce and Industry, Chicago United, the Leadership Council for Metropolitan Open Communities, and Dearborn Park Corp., and served as vice president of the Chicago Board of Education.

Ayers also served on the board of directors of Sears, G.D. Searle, Chicago Pacific Corp., Zenith Corp., Northwest Industries, General Dynamics Corp. of St. Louis, First National Bank of Chicago, the Chicago Cubs, and the Tribune Co.

In 1938, he married Mary Andrew, the mother of his children. His son William Ayers, once the leader of the radical Weather Underground, has been a professor of education at the University of Illinois at Chicago since 1987. His son John Ayers, once on the staff (1983–1986) of former U.S. Rep. Lane Evans (D-IL), is a national leader in charter school development.
