= Peter Shiao =

Peter Shiao (Chinese: 萧培寰; pinyin: Xiāo Péiyuán) is a cross border entrepreneur, film and media producer, financier, marketer, social activist and commentator, who, throughout his multi-industry career, has sought to unite the East and West.

He is currently the Founder and CEO of Immortal Studios, an original content studio focused on developing stories derived from the Wuxia genre (martial arts, fantasy). His father, Shiao Yi, was one of the best-known Wuxia novelists.

He has been quoted extensively on all things Hollywood-China in The Economist, CNBC, The Guardian, The Los Angeles Times, The Los Angeles Business Journal, National Public Radio, The Hollywood Reporter, Shoutout LA Sampan, China Daily and many others.

== Hollywood-China career ==
Shiao previously founded Orb Media Group, a company focused on producing, financing and marketing films and online games with transformational themes that unite the international and Chinese markets.

Prior to Orb, Shiao was Founder and CEO of Ironpond, a US and China based producer and financier affiliated with the China Film Group. It was the first private equity style fund for films in China for both English and Chinese language films.

Shiao also co-founded Celestial Pictures from which he produced Restless (1998 film), which The New York Times billed as "the first English-language movie to be filmed in contemporary Beijing and the first United States-Chinese co-production."

In 2009, Shiao founded the US-China Film Summit, a gathering of thought leaders and content creators in American and Asian entertainment, held annually with the Asia Society, the Motion Picture Association, the Producers Guild of America and the China Film Co-Production Corporation. The US-China Film Summit underwent a name change in 2019 and is now known as US-Asia Entertainment Summit.

He was appointed as chairman of entertainment and media of Asia Society Southern California in 2010, helping to unite China and Hollywood entertainment.

Shiao has spoken extensively at conferences, including at the Milken Summit, Harvard Business School, Harvard China Forum, Variety's Future of Film Summit, the Global Alliance for Transformational Entertainment, the Game Summit and the US-China Film Summit.

== ChinaWeek and California-China Relations ==
Since 2014, he has served as founder and Chairman of ChinaWeek, a nonprofit organization partnered with the Los Angeles Times which hosts and presents an annual series of large scale events throughout Southern California. Past event partners have included the Getty Museum, the Los Angeles County Museum of Art, Milken Institute, Huntington Library, University of Southern California, University of California - Los Angeles and the Bowers Museum.

Shiao also founded the annual California-China Business Summit with then California Governor Jerry Brown under ChinaWeek, and played a pivotal role in mobilizing the California-China Strategic MOU signed by Governor Brown and Chinese President Xi Jinping. He has also testified in the CA Legislature in support of developing closer economic and cultural ties with China.

Before his career in media, Shiao served as policy and political staff on the California State Senate and was responsible for the California Senate Committees on the Pacific Rim, the Entertainment Industry, and Rebuilding Los Angeles.

== Shaolin Temple ==
Shiao has also worked closely with the Shaolin Monastery, known also as the Shaolin Temple of China, to share Shaolin Kung Fu and Zen lineage globally, including chairing the Shaolin Summit and heading the Shaolin US Association. He also oversaw the North American region for the reality show, K-Star, a joint production by Shaolin Temple and Shenzhen Media Group on finding the next martial arts action hero.
