= Taiwan Daily =

- The April 15, 2007 front page of Taiwan Daily
- Type: Daily newspaper
- Format: Broadsheet
- Owner: Taiwan Daily News Network
- Founded: October 25, 1964
- Ceased publication: June 6, 2006
- Headquarters: 2646 Durfer Ave. #168; El Monte, CA 91732-3472; United States
- Website: taiwandaily.net

Taiwan Daily
- Traditional Chinese: 臺灣日報
- Simplified Chinese: 台湾日报
Transcriptions
Standard Mandarin
- Hanyu Pinyin: Táiwān Rìbào
Southern Min
- Hokkien POJ: Tâi-oân Ji̍t-pò

Taiwan Daily (Chinese: 台灣日報) was a daily newspaper based in Taiwan that began circulation on 25 October 1964 and ended on 6 June 2006. It now exists as an online publication.

== Features ==
The Taiwan Daily was usually published as broadsheet in full color, excepting classified ads and extended articles. It was divided into five sections, General News, United States and Community, Leisure and Living, Sports, and Advertisements. As is characteristic of Taiwan Paparazzi, articles usually featured comprehensive biographies covering celebrities' height and weight, as well as provocative pictures of strippers and celebrity relations.

== History ==
Taiwan Daily was founded on 25 October 1964, as Oriental Daily (東方日報), in Keelung. In 1976 the paper was renamed Taiwan Daily, amongst semantic criticism. By that time, the Daily had reached 300,000 copies in circulation, and was Taiwan's largest newspaper. It ceased publication on 6 June 2006.

As of 2018, it exists as an online publication.
