= Stephanie Shiao =

Taiwanese actress, model, singer, and writer

- 蕭薔
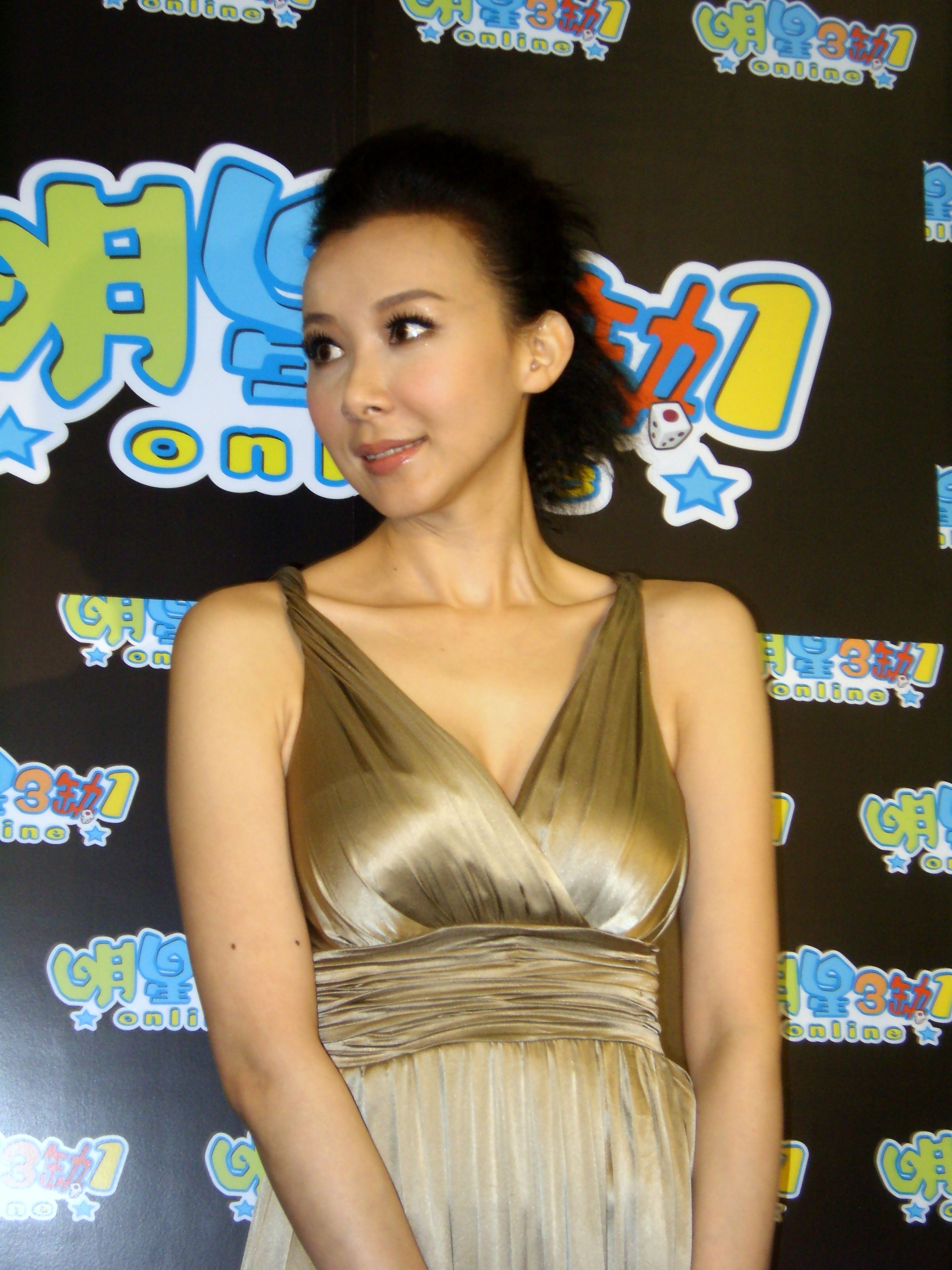
- Shiao at the 2008 Taipei Game Show.
- Born: Shiao Xiuxia; 13 August 1968 (age 58); Yonghe District, New Taipei City, Taiwan
- Education: Chinese Culture University
- Occupations: Actress, model, singer, writer
- Years active: 1989–present
- Relatives: Xiao Zhichu (grandfather)
- Musical career
- Genres: Mandopop
- Label: Jinmao Communication Company

Chinese name
- Traditional Chinese: 蕭薔
- Simplified Chinese: 萧蔷
Transcriptions
Standard Mandarin
- Hanyu Pinyin: Xiāo Qiáng

Stephanie Shiao (Chinese: 蕭薔; born 13 August 1968) is a Taiwanese actress, model, singer and writer.

== Early life and education ==
Shiao was born Shiao Xiuxia (Chinese: 蕭秀霞) in Yonghe District of New Taipei City, Taiwan, on August 13, 1968, while her ancestral home in Heze, north China's Shandong province. Her grandfather Xiao Zhichu was a lieutenant general in the National Revolutionary Army of the Republic of China (ROC). She graduated from the Chinese Culture University.

== Filmography ==
=== Film ===
Year	English title	Chinese title	Role	Notes
2000	A Matter of Time	新賭國仇城	Zhang Manli	
2008	Friendship Unto Death	雷橫與朱仝	Bai Xiuying	
2010	Illusion Apartment	異度公寓	Mei Zi	
2011	Laugh and Cry Forbidden	哭笑不得	Liu Shasha	
2017	Fall in Love	愛上處女座	Liu Xia	
2018	Changan Yokai Talk	长安妖奇谈	Xiao Qianya	
2019	Bad Boy Symphony	樂獄	Kuan Hui-ping	

=== Television ===
Year	English title	Chinese title	Role	Notes
1989	Aimer par Coeur	情深無怨尤	Lin Mulan	
1990	Biography of Yu Rang	刺客列傳：豫讓	Zhen Qian	
1990	Flying Geese	雙飛雁	Cen Peijuan	
1990	Phoenix from the Ashes	浴火鳳凰	Ba Hongying	
1990		今天不看病	guest	
1991	Two Moons	兩個月亮	Zhang Xiaoru	
1991	A Happy Hero	歡樂英雄	Zhang Ermei	
1992	Love Shines Upon the Star-Studded Sky	愛在星光燦爛時	Li Guanmei	
1992	Lucky Cousin	表妹吉祥		
1992	Endless Love	無盡的愛		
1993	A Terracotta Warrior	秦俑	Xu Yuwa	
1993	Lady Enforcers	霸王花		
1994	Blue Lotus	青蓮花	Xu Tingting	
1994		七俠五義人之太歲莊	Yun Wenqiu	
1995	The Blazing Sun	燃燒的太陽	Zhao Xueman	
1995	Mazu Worship Guanyin	媽祖拜觀音		
1995	Don't Say Love Me	別說愛我		
1995	People in the Glass House	玻璃屋裡的人		
