= Wolong Sheng =

Chinese writer

Niu Heting
- Born: 1930; Zhenping County, Henan, China
- Died: 1997 (aged 66–67)
- Occupation: Novelist
- Writing career
- Pen name: Wolong Sheng
- Genre: Wuxia

Niu Heting (Chinese: 牛鶴亭; 1930–1997), better known by his pen name Wolong Sheng (Chinese: 臥龍生), was a Chinese writer of wuxia novels.

Niu was born in Zhenping County, Henan, China. He published about 30 novels in a span of over two decades and his works dominated the modern wuxia genre until Gu Long came into the scene.

== Novels ==
- Windblown Dust, Hidden Hero (風塵俠隱)
- Rainbow-Startling Sword Shakes the Rivers and Lakes (驚虹一劍震江湖)
- Flying Swallow Startles the Dragon (飛燕驚龍)
- Iron Flute, Divine Sword (鐵笛神劍)
- Jade Hairpin Oath (玉釵盟)
- Heavenly Fragrant Whirlwind (天香飆)
- Nameless Flute (無名簫)
- The Tiger's Den (虎穴)
- Red Snow, Black Frost (絳雪玄霜)
- The Delicate Hand Incident (素手劫)
- Inseparable Hero Companions (天涯俠侶)
- Golden Sword, Eagle Feathers (金劍雕翎)
- The Weathered Swallow Returns (風雨燕歸來)
- Heavenly Sword, Superb Sabre (天劍絕刀)
- Twin Phoenix Flags (雙鳳旗)
- Fluttering Flower Decree (飄花令)
- Favor-Returning Sword (還情劍)
- Heavenly Crane Manual (天鶴譜)
- The Sword As a Matchmaker (指劍為媒)
- Holy Sword, Sentimental Sabre (聖劍情刀)
- Iron Sword, Jade Pendant (鐵劍玉佩)
- Kingfisher Sleeve, Jade Bracelet (翠袖玉環)
- Escort Banner (鏢旗)
- Gallant Heroes of China (神州豪俠傳)
- Hero Shadow, Demon Tracks (俠影魔蹤)
- Winter Plum, Proud Frost (寒梅傲霜)
- Jade Hand Assignment (玉手點將錄)
- Flying Bell (飛鈴)
- Flying Dragon of the Remote Regions (八荒飛龍記)
- Shake the Flower, Release the Hawk (搖花放鷹傳)
- Bloody Sword, Loyal Heart (血劍丹心)
- Gold Phoenix Arrow (金鳳剪)
- The Golden Brush Dots the Eye of the Dragon (金筆點龍記)
- Invisible Sword (無形劍)
- Flower Phoenix (花鳳)
- Smoke Locks the Rivers and Lakes (煙鎖江湖)
- Spring and Autumn Brush (春秋筆)
- Black and White Sword (黑白劍)
- Four Spirit Beauties (幽靈四艷)
- The Sword that Leaves No Mark (劍無痕)
- Heavenly Dragon Armor (天龍甲)
- Chivalry and Tenderness (俠骨柔情)
- Flying Flower Chases the Moon (飛花逐月)
- Frost Raiment of the Heavenly Steed (天馬霜衣)

== Adaptations ==
- The Magic Crane (1993)
- The Snow Is Red (1996)
- The Jade Hairpin Alliance (1980)
