= Sima Ling =

Chinese novelist (1933–1989)

Wu Siming
- Born: 1933
- Died: 1989 (aged 55–56)
- Occupation: Novelist
- Writing career
- Pen name: Sima Ling
- Genre: Wuxia

Wu Siming (Chinese: 吳思明; 1933–1989), better known by his pen name Sima Ling (Chinese: 司馬翎), was a Chinese writer of wuxia novels. Over the course of his career, he has published 40 of his works.

== Works ==
Sima Ling's top novels include, but are not limited to, Flying eagle in a sea of Swords (剑海鹰汤) and Watering horse by Yellow River (饮马黄河). These two books are considered by some as classics but garnered relatively little attention. Sima Ling displayed creative, fast paced and intriguing writing style in these two novels.

Known as an talented Wuxia writer, Sima Ling wrote Wuxia novels that were very well received. However, he did not gain much popularity like other skilled writers such as Jin Yong, Gu Long, Liang Yusheng, and Huang Yi enjoyed. In comparison, his novels remained relatively unknown for many Wuxia fans.

His novels have the following merits:

1. The stories start with some fast paced opening and very soon the readers will develop strong interest in the puzzles displayed, and can only stop reading at the end of the story;
2. There are many well-prepared traps and well-calculated fighting in each book, which is key feature of classical Wuxia novels for many fans. In fact, the logic was displayed so clearly and sophisticated, that these duels are more like board games, but not fighting with violence. The readers will be stunned again and again by the development of the plot, but at the same time, feel this is the best each person can do in the novel.

In a word, the heroes/heroines in Sima Ling's novels known for being written very intelligently.

Shortcomings:

1. Sima Ling did not tell very moving love stories. On one hand, his heroes/heroines are doing something very great according to Wuxia morals. On the other hand, they do not do things as many common people do. As a result, these people can mostly be respected or admired but not loved. These people are smart and strong, but they are too far from the readers' life experience, emotional experience and even reading experience.
2. Sima Ling's stories, especially the merits, are difficult to display with visual media, or in another word, in movie or TV. There are so much calculation and struggles in the mind, which are the most wonderful part for his stories and can only be shown clearly with words stimulating imagination.

There is a strong link between Sima Ling and Huang Yi. Readers can find many similarities between Huang Yi's novels and Sima Ling's. As Huang Yi published many novels and became very popular only after Sima's death, it is safe to say that Huang Yi was most likely influenced by Sima, though it is not well known to readers. From this aspect, we can see that Sima is very creative.

Ni Kuang, a popular Hong Kong Wuxia and Science-fiction writer, claimed that he learnt writing from Sima.
