= Fugitive Days =

2001 book by Bill Ayers

- Author: Bill Ayers
- Language: English
- Genre: Memoir
- Publisher: Beacon Press (2001); Penguin Group (2003)
- Publication date: 2001
- Publication place: United States
- ISBN: 0-8070-7124-2

Fugitive Days is a memoir by Bill Ayers. Ayers chronicles his childhood, his radicalization, his days as a leader of the Weather Underground, and his days on the run from the US government. The book was originally published by Beacon Press in 2001 and was republished by Penguin Group in 2003, featuring a new afterword by the author.

Timothy Noah of Slate described Ayers's tales of bombings and other illegal activities as "self-indulgent and morally clueless ... Ayers periodically expresses mild regret for his crimes, in tones reminiscent of a middle-aged insurance executive who wishes he hadn't gotten drunk quite so often at his college fraternity". Former Weather member Cathy Wilkerson called it "inaccurate" and "a cynical, superficial romp ... making these struggles seem like a glorious carnival". Jesse Lemisch's New Politics review describes it as "a dubious account, full of anachronisms, inaccuracies, unacknowledged borrowings from unnamed sources ... It's also faux literary and soft core ... littered with boasts of Ayers's sexual achievements, utterly untouched by feminism."

In contrast, Studs Terkel called the book "a deeply moving elegy to all those young dreamers who tried to live decently in an indecent world".

In October 2008 it was reported that John D. Hancock was attempting to make a movie based on the book.
