= Early life and career of Barack Obama =

Barack Obama II
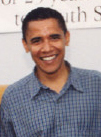
- Barack Obama c. 1998
- Born: Barack Hussein Obama II; August 4, 1961 (age 65); Honolulu, Hawaii, U.S.
- Education: Columbia University (BA); Harvard University (JD)
- Occupations: Politician; lawyer
- Years active: 1979–present

Barack Obama, the 44th president of the United States, was born on August 4, 1961, in Honolulu, Hawaii, to Barack Obama, Sr. (1936–1982; born in Oriang' Kogelo of Rachuonyo North District, Kenya) and Stanley Ann Dunham, known as Ann (1942–1995; born in Wichita, Kansas, United States).

Obama spent most of his childhood years in Honolulu, where his mother attended the University of Hawaiʻi at Mānoa. Obama had a close relationship with his maternal grandparents. In 1965, his mother remarried to Lolo Soetoro from Indonesia. Two years later, Dunham took Obama with her to Indonesia to reunite him with his stepfather. In 1971, Obama returned to Honolulu to attend Punahou School, from which he graduated in 1979.

As a young adult, Obama moved to the contiguous United States, where he was educated at Occidental College, Columbia University, and Harvard Law School. In Chicago, Obama worked at various times as a community organizer, lawyer, lecturer and senior Lecturer of constitutional law at the University of Chicago Law School in the city's South Side, and later published his memoir Dreams from My Father before beginning his political career in 1997 as a member of the Illinois Senate.

== Childhood years ==
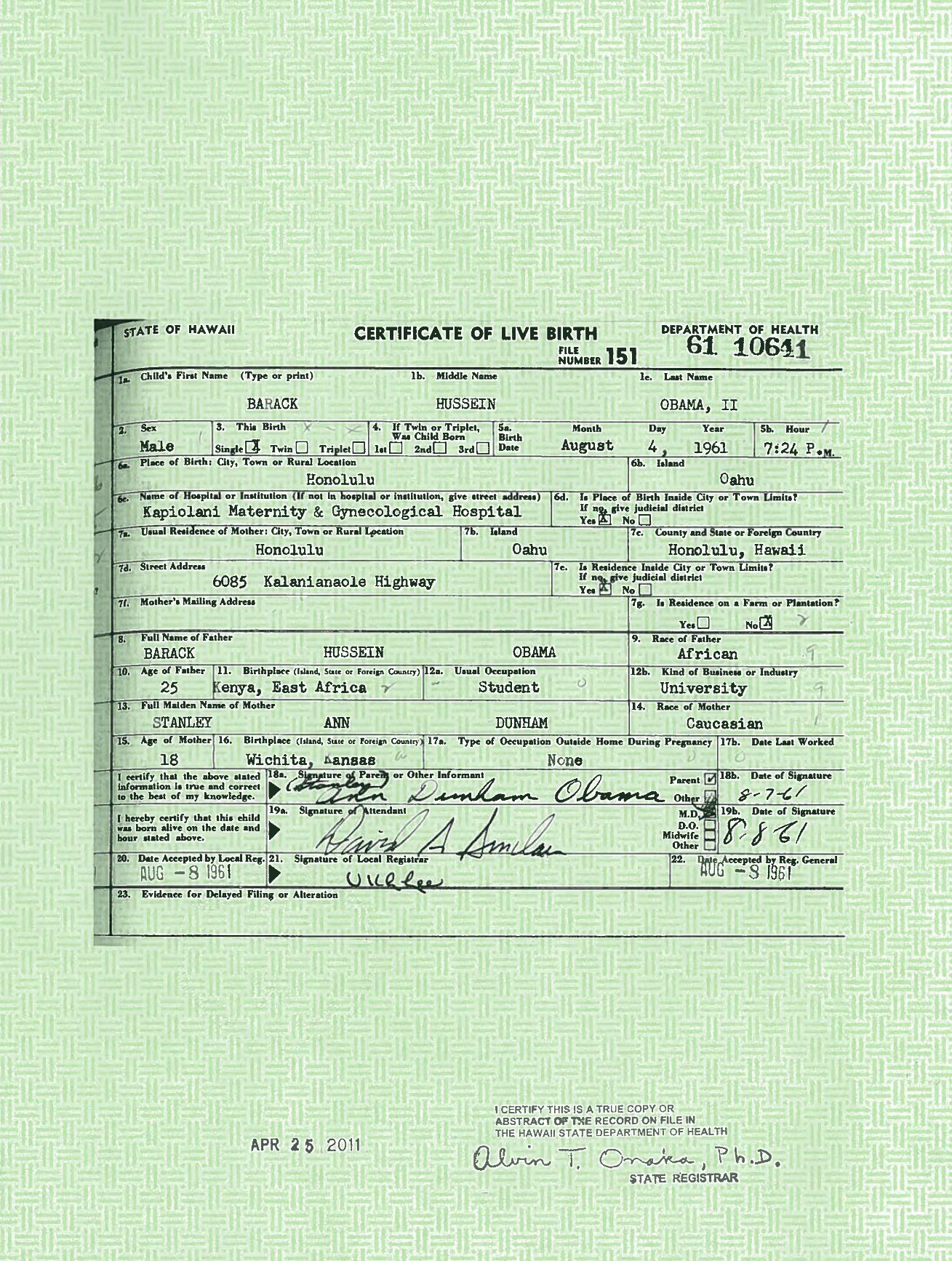
Obama's long form birth certificate

=== Parents' background; life in Hawaii ===
Barack Obama's parents met in 1960 while they were attending the University of Hawaii at Manoa. Obama's father, Barack Obama, Sr., who was the university's first foreign student from an African nation, hailed from Oriang' Kogelo, Rachuonyo North District, in the Nyanza Province of western Kenya. Obama's mother, Stanley Ann Dunham, known as Ann, was born in Wichita, Kansas. The couple were married on the Hawaiian island of Maui on February 2, 1961.

Barack Hussein Obama II, named for his father, was born in Honolulu on August 4, 1961, at the old Kapiolani Maternity and Gynecological Hospital at 1611 Bingham Street (a predecessor of the Kapiʻolani Medical Center for Women and Children at 1319 Punahou Street). The Honolulu Advertiser and the Honolulu Star-Bulletin announced the birth.

Soon after their son's birth, while Obama's father continued his education at the University of Hawaii, Ann Dunham took the infant to Seattle, Washington, where she took classes at the University of Washington from September 1961 to June 1962. She and young Barack lived in an apartment in the Capitol Hill neighborhood. Obama, Sr. left the state in June 1962, after graduating from the University of Hawaii with a B.A. in economics. He moved to Cambridge, Massachusetts that Autumn for graduate study in economics at Harvard University.

Ann Dunham returned to Honolulu with her son, and in January 1963 resumed her undergraduate education at the University of Hawaii. In January 1964, Dunham filed for divorce, which was not contested. Barack Obama, Sr. later graduated from Harvard University with an A.M. in economics and in 1965 returned to Kenya.

During her first year back at the University of Hawaii, Dunham met Lolo Soetoro. He was one year into his American experience, after two semesters at the Manoa campus and a summer on the mainland at Northwestern University and the University of Wisconsin, when he encountered Dunham, who was then an undergraduate majoring in anthropology. A surveyor from Indonesia, Soetoro had come to Honolulu in September 1962 on an East–West Center grant to study at the University of Hawaii. He earned an M.A. in geography in June 1964.

Dunham and Soetoro were married on March 15, 1965, on the island of Molokai. The couple returned to Honolulu with 3-year-old Barack to live as a family. After two one-year extensions of his J-1 visa, Soetoro returned to Indonesia on June 20, 1966. Dunham and her son moved in with her parents at their house. She continued with her studies, earning a B.A. in anthropology in August 1967, while Barack attended kindergarten in 1966–1967 at Noelani Elementary School.

=== Indonesia ===
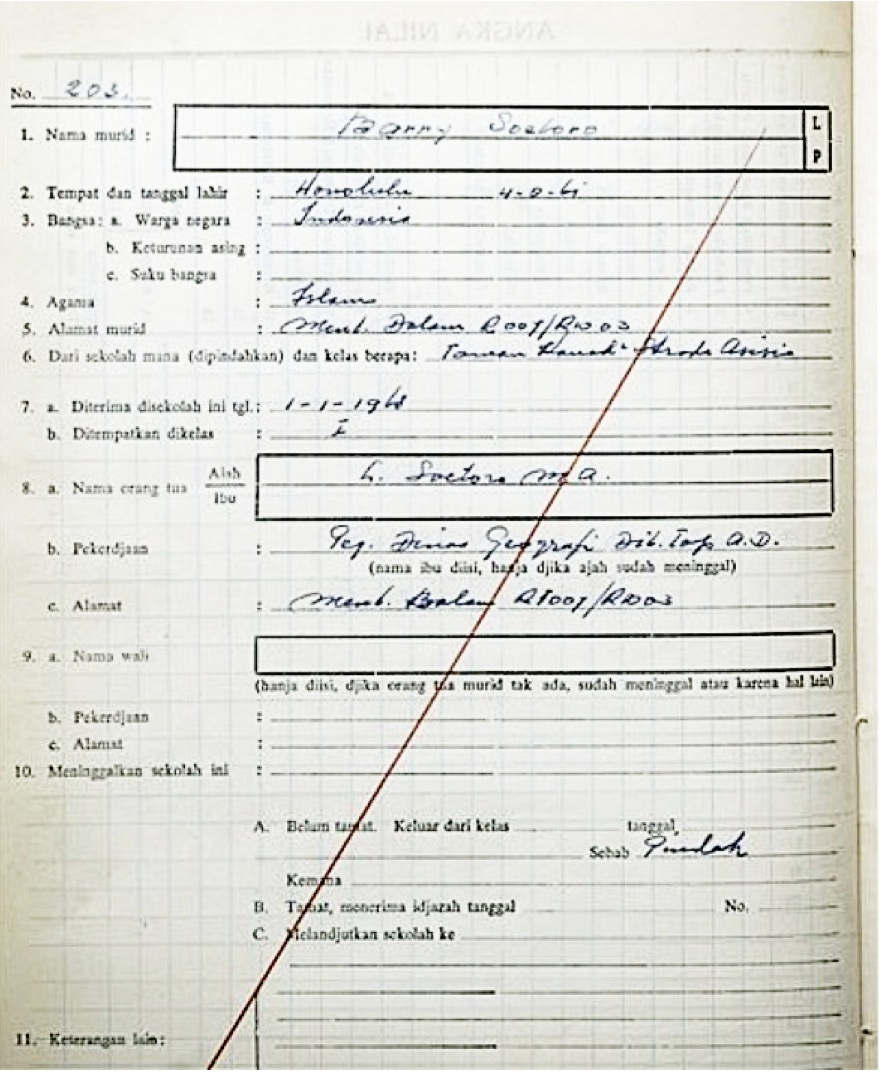
Barack Obama's school record in St. Francis of Assisi Catholic Elementary School. Obama was enrolled as "Barry Soetoro" (no. 1), and was wrongly recorded as an Indonesian citizen (no. 3) and a Muslim (no. 4).

In 1967, Obama and his mother moved to Jakarta (known as Djakarta at the time) to rejoin his stepfather. The family initially lived in a newly built neighborhood in the Menteng Dalam administrative village of the Tebet subdistrict in South Jakarta for two and a half years, while Soetoro worked on a topographic survey for the Indonesian government. From January 1968 to December 1969, Obama's mother taught English and served as an assistant director of the U.S. government-subsidized Indonesia-America Friendship Institute, while Obama attended the Indonesian-language Santo Fransiskus Asisi (St. Francis of Assisi) Catholic School around the corner from their house for 1st, 2nd, and part of 3rd grade.

Obama's mother met a transgender person named Evie (who was known as Trudi at the time), at a cocktail party in 1969. Dunham was so impressed by Evie's beef steak and fried rice that she offered her a job in the family home. It did not take long before Evie was also caretaker for then eight-year-old "Barry", as Obama was often referred to as then, and his baby sister Maya. As a caretaker, she also spent time playing with Obama and bringing him to and from school, which she continued to do for about two years.

In 1970, Soetoro took a new job at higher pay in Union Oil Company's government relations office. From January 1970 to August 1972, Obama's mother taught English and was a department head and a director of the Institute of Management Education and Development. Obama attended the Indonesian-language government-run Besuki School, one-and-half miles east in the exclusive Menteng administrative village, for part of 3rd grade and for 4th grade. By this time, he had picked up on some Indonesian in addition to his native English. He also joined the Cub Scouts.

In the summer of 1970, Obama returned to Hawaii for an extended visit with his maternal grandparents, Stanley and Madelyn Dunham. His mother had also arranged an interview for possible admission to the Punahou School in Honolulu, one of the top private schools in the city. On August 15, 1970, Dunham and Soetoro celebrated the birth of their daughter, Maya Kassandra Soetoro.

=== Return to Hawaii ===
In mid-1971, Obama moved back to Hawaii to live with his grandparents and attend Punahou School starting in fifth grade. In December 1971, Obama was visited for a month by his father, Barack Obama Sr., from Kenya. It was the last time Obama would see his father. This was followed by his mother visiting her son and parents in Honolulu from late 1971 to January 1972.

In 1972, Dunham returned to Hawaii, bringing along the young Maya, Obama's half-sister. Dunham started graduate study in anthropology at the University of Hawaii at Manoa. From sixth grade through eighth grade at Punahou, Obama lived with his mother and Maya.

Obama's mother completed her coursework at the University of Hawaii for an M.A. in anthropology in December 1974. After three years in Hawaii, she and Maya returned to Jakarta in August 1975, where Dunham completed her contract with the Institute of Management Education and Development and started anthropological fieldwork. Obama chose to stay with his grandparents in Honolulu to continue his studies at Punahou School for his high school years.

In his memoir Obama describes his experiences growing up in his mother's middle class family. His knowledge about his African father, who returned once for a brief visit in 1971, came mainly through family stories and photographs. Of his early childhood, Obama writes: "That my father looked nothing like the people around me—that he was black as pitch, my mother white as milk—barely registered in my mind." The book describes his struggles as a young adult to reconcile social perceptions of his multiracial heritage. He wrote that he used alcohol, marijuana, and cocaine during his teenage years to "push questions of who I was out of my mind". Obama was also a member of the "choom gang", a self-named group of friends that spent time together and occasionally smoked marijuana. Obama has said that it was a serious mistake. At the Saddleback Civil Presidential Forum, Barack Obama identified his high-school drug use as his greatest moral failure. Obama has stated he has not used any illegal drugs since he was a teenager.

Some of his fellow students attending Punahou School later told the Honolulu Star-Bulletin that Obama was mature for his age as a high school student and that he sometimes attended parties and other events in order to associate with African American college students and military service people. Reflecting later on his formative years in Honolulu, Obama wrote: "The opportunity that Hawaii offered—to experience a variety of cultures in a climate of mutual respect—became an integral part of my world view, and a basis for the values that I hold most dear."

== Education summary ==
Grades	Dates	School	Location	Type	Degree/notes
Kindergarten	1966–1967	Noelani Elementary School	Honolulu, Hawaii	Public	
1st–3rd grade	1968–1970	St. Francis Assisi	Jakarta, Indonesia	Private; Catholic	
4th grade	1970–1971	State Elementary School Menteng 01	Jakarta, Indonesia	Public	
5th–12th grade	1971–1979	Punahou School	Honolulu, Hawaii	Private	High school diploma, 1979
Freshman–Sophomore year	1979–1981	Occidental College	Los Angeles	Private	Transferred to Columbia
Junior–Senior year	1981–1983	Columbia University	New York City	Private	B.A., political science major with international relations and English literature
1L–3L	1988–1991	Harvard Law School	Cambridge, Massachusetts	Private	J.D., magna cum laude President, Harvard Law Review

== Adult life ==
=== College years ===
Following high school, Obama moved to Los Angeles in 1979, where he studied at Occidental College for two years. On February 18, 1981, he made his first public speech, calling for Occidental's divestment from South Africa. In the summer of 1981, Obama traveled to Jakarta to visit his mother and half-sister Maya, and visited the families of Occidental College friends in Hyderabad (India) and Karachi (Pakistan) for three weeks.

He then transferred to Columbia University in New York City, where he majored in political science with a speciality in international relations and in English literature. Obama lived off campus in a modest rented apartment at 142 West 109th Street. He graduated with a B.A. from Columbia in 1983, then worked at Business International Corporation and New York Public Interest Research Group.

=== Early career in Chicago ===
After four years living in New York, Obama moved to Chicago to work as a community organizer. He worked for three years from June 1985 to May 1988 as director of the Developing Communities Project (DCP), a church-based community organization originally comprising eight Catholic parishes in Greater Roseland (Roseland, West Pullman, and Riverdale) on Chicago's far South Side. During his three years as the DCP's director, its staff grew from 1 to 13 and its annual budget grew from $70,000 to $400,000, with accomplishments including helping set up a job training program, a college preparatory tutoring program, and a tenants' rights organization in Altgeld Gardens. Obama also worked as a consultant and instructor for the Gamaliel Foundation, a community organizing institute. In the summer of 1988, he traveled for the first time to Europe for three weeks then to Kenya for five weeks where he met many of his paternal relatives for the first time.

=== Law School ===
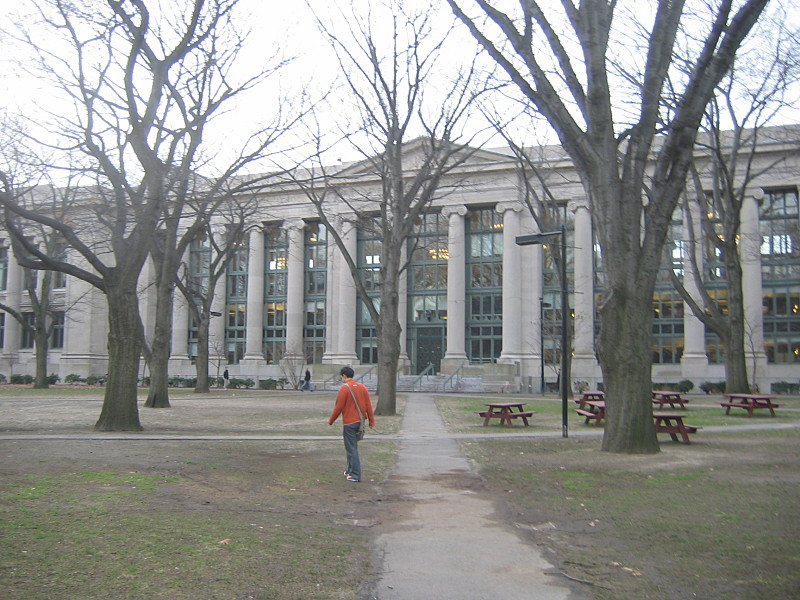
Langdell Hall, home of the Harvard Law School library

Obama entered Harvard Law School in late 1988. In an interview with Ebony in 1990, he stated that he saw a degree in law as a vehicle to facilitate better community organization and activism: "The idea was not only to get people to learn how to hope and dream about different possibilities, but to know how the tax structure affects what kind of housing gets built where." At the end of his first year he was selected as an editor of the Harvard Law Review based on his grades and a writing competition. In February 1990, his second year at Harvard, he was elected president of the law review, a full-time volunteer position functioning as editor-in-chief and supervising the law review's staff of 80 editors. Obama's election as the first black president of the law review was widely reported and followed by several long, detailed profiles. He got himself elected by convincing a crucial swing bloc of conservatives that he would protect their interests if they supported him. Building up that trust was done with the same kind of long listening sessions he had used in the poor neighborhoods of South Side, Chicago. Richard Epstein, who later taught at the University of Chicago Law School when Obama later taught there, said Obama was elected editor "because people on the other side believed he would give them a fair shake."

While in law school he worked as an associate at the law firm Sidley & Austin in 1989, where he met his future wife, Michelle LaVaughn Robinson, and where Newton N. Minow was a managing partner. Minow later would introduce Obama to some of Chicago's top business leaders. In the summer of 1990 he worked at Hopkins & Sutter. Also during his law school years, Obama spent eight days in Los Angeles taking a national training course on Alinsky methods of organizing. He graduated with a J.D. magna cum laude from Harvard in 1991 and returned to Chicago.

=== Settling down in Chicago ===
The publicity from his election as the first African American president of the Harvard Law Review led to a contract and advance to write a book about race relations. In an effort to recruit him to their faculty, the University of Chicago Law School provided Obama with a fellowship and an office to work on his book. He originally planned to finish the book in one year, but it took much longer as the book evolved into a personal memoir. In order to work without interruptions, Obama and his wife, Michelle, traveled to Bali where he wrote for several months. The manuscript was finally published as Dreams from My Father in mid-1995.

He married Michelle in 1992 and settled down with her in Hyde Park, a liberal, integrated, middle-class Chicago neighborhood with a history of electing reform-minded politicians independent of the Daley political machine. The couple's first daughter, Malia Ann, was born in 1998; their second, Natasha (known as Sasha), in 2001.

One effect of the marriage was to bring Obama closer to other politically influential Chicagoans. One of Michelle's best friends was Jesse Jackson's daughter, Santita Jackson, later the godmother of the Obamas' first child. Michelle herself had worked as an aide to Mayor Richard M. Daley. Marty Nesbitt, a young, successful black businessman (who played basketball with Michelle's brother, Craig Robinson), became Obama's best friend and introduced him to other African-American business people. Before the marriage, according to Craig, Obama talked about his political ambitions, even saying that he might run for president someday.

=== Project Vote ===
Obama directed Illinois Project Vote from April to October 1992, a voter registration drive, officially nonpartisan, that helped Carol Moseley Braun become the first black woman ever elected to the Senate. He headed up a staff of 10 and 700 volunteers that achieved its goal of 400,000 registered African Americans in the state, leading Crain's Chicago Business to name Obama to its 1993 list of "40 under Forty" powers to be. Although fundraising was not required for the position when Obama was recruited for the job, he started an active campaign to raise money for the project. According to Sandy Newman, who founded Project Vote, Obama "raised more money than any of our state directors had ever done. He did a great job of enlisting a broad spectrum of organizations and people, including many who did not get along well with one another."

The fundraising brought Obama into contact with the wealthy, liberal elite of Chicago, some of whom became supporters in his future political career. Through one of them he met David Axelrod, who later headed Obama's campaign for president. The fundraising committee was chaired by John Schmidt, a former chief of staff to Mayor Richard M. Daley, and John W. Rogers Jr., a young black money manager and founder of Ariel Capital Management. Obama also met much of the city's black political leadership, although he didn't always get along with the older politicians, with friction sometimes developing over Obama's reluctance to spend money and his insistence on results. "He really did it, and he let other people take all the credit", Schmidt later said. "The people standing up at the press conferences were Jesse Jackson and Bobby Rush and I don't know who else. Barack was off to the side and only the people who were close to it knew he had done all the work."

=== 1992–1996 ===
Obama taught constitutional law at the University of Chicago Law School for twelve years, as a Lecturer for four years (1992–1996), and as a Senior Lecturer for eight years (1996–2004). During this time he taught courses in due process and equal protection, voting rights, and racism and law. He published no legal scholarship, and turned down tenured positions, but served eight years in the Illinois Senate during his twelve years at the university.

In 1993 Obama joined Davis, Miner, Barnhill & Galland, a 12-attorney law firm specializing in civil rights litigation and neighborhood economic development, where he was an associate for three years from 1993 to 1996, then of counsel from 1996 to 2004, with his law license becoming inactive in 2007. The firm was well known among influential Chicago liberals and leaders of the black community, and the firm's Judson H. Miner, who met with Obama to recruit him before Obama's 1991 graduation from law school, had been counsel to former Chicago Mayor Harold Washington, although the law firm often clashed with the administration of Mayor Richard M. Daley. The 29-year-old law student made it clear in his initial interview with Miner that he was more interested in joining the firm to learn about Chicago politics than to practice law.

During the four years Obama worked as a full-time lawyer at the firm, he was involved in 30 cases and accrued 3,723 billable hours. Obama was listed as counsel on four cases before the United States Court of Appeals for the Seventh Circuit. Two of these cases involved ACORN suing Governor Jim Edgar under the new Motor Voter Act, one involved a voter suing Mayor Daley under the Voting Rights Act, and one involved, in the only case Obama orally argued, a whistleblowing stockbroker suing his former employer. All of these appeals were resolved in favor of Obama's clients, with all the opinions authored by Obama's University of Chicago colleague Chief Judge Richard Posner.

Obama was a founding member of the board of directors of Public Allies in 1992, resigning before his wife, Michelle, became the founding executive director of Public Allies Chicago in early 1993. He served on the board of directors of the Woods Fund of Chicago, which in 1985 had been the first foundation to fund Obama's DCP, from 1993 to 2002, and served on the board of directors of The Joyce Foundation from 1994 to 2002. Membership on the Joyce and Wood foundation boards, which gave out tens of millions of dollars to various local organizations while Obama was a member, helped Obama get to know and be known by influential liberal groups and cultivate a network of community activists that later supported his political career. Obama served on the board of directors of the Chicago Annenberg Challenge from 1995 to 2002, as founding president and chairman of the board of directors from 1995 to 1999. He also served on the board of directors of the Chicago Lawyers' Committee for Civil Rights Under Law, the Center for Neighborhood Technology, and the Lugenia Burns Hope Center. In 1995, Obama also announced his candidacy for a seat in the Illinois state Senate and attended Louis Farrakhan's Million Man March in Washington, DC.
