= Chicago Annenberg Challenge =

US public school reform project

The Chicago Annenberg Challenge (CAC) was a Chicago public school reform project from 1995 to 2001 that worked with half of Chicago's public schools and was funded by a $49.2 million, 2-to-1 matching challenge grant over five years from the Annenberg Foundation. The grant was contingent on being matched by $49.2 million in private donations and $49.2 million in public money. The Chicago Annenberg Challenge was one of 18 locally designed Annenberg Challenge project sites that received $387 million over five years as part of Walter Annenberg's gift of $500 million over five years to support public school reform. The Chicago Annenberg Challenge helped create a successor organization, the Chicago Public Education Fund (CPEF), committing $2 million in June 1998 as the first donor to Chicago's first community foundation for education.

== Annenberg Challenge ==
In the 1990s, billionaire Walter Annenberg, former ambassador to the United Kingdom under President Richard Nixon, was the United States' most generous living philanthropist. By 1998, Annenberg had given away more than $2 billion and the assets of the Annenberg Foundation he had established in June 1989 with $1 billion had grown to $3 billion and ranked as the 12th largest in the U.S. Every weekday from May through November, Annenberg was driven from his home in Wynnewood, Pennsylvania to his Annenberg Foundation headquarters in St. Davids, Pennsylvania, where, as its sole director, he reserved virtually every decision for himself when making grants.

In June 1993, Annenberg announced he was making the largest individual gift to private education in history—$365 million to four schools: $120 million each to the communication programs at the University of Pennsylvania and the University of Southern California, $25 million to Harvard College, and $100 million to his alma mater, the Peddie School in Hightstown, New Jersey.

In October 1993, Annenberg announced an unrestricted $25 million gift to Northwestern University bringing his total donations to Northwestern to $55 million, his last major gift to higher education for five years as he shifted the focus of his philanthropy to public K–12 education.

Annenberg told Newton Minow, senior counsel of Sidley & Austin, chairman of the Carnegie Corporation (1993–1997), Annenberg Professor of Communications Law and Policy at Northwestern University (1987–2003) and director of its Annenberg Washington Program (1987–1996): "Everybody around the world wants to send their kids to our universities. South America, Asia, Europe, all of them. But nobody wants to send their kids here to public school. Who would, especially in a big city? Nobody. So we've got to do something. If we don't, our civilization will collapse."

Annenberg sought recommendations on making a large gift to American public schools from his pro bono education advisors:

1. Vartan Gregorian, president of Brown University (1989–1997); president of the Carnegie Corporation (1997–); former president of the New York Public Library; former professor of Southwest Asian history, dean, and provost of the University of Pennsylvania
2. Ted Sizer, founding chairman of the Coalition of Essential Schools (CES) (1984–1997); professor of education at Brown University (1983–1997); former headmaster of Phillips Andover (1972–1981); former dean of the Harvard Graduate School of Education (1964–1972)
3. David Kearns, chairman of the Alexandria-based New American Schools Development Corporation (NASDC)—a 1991 school reform initiative of President George H. W. Bush; former Deputy Secretary of Education (1991–1993) under Secretary of Education Lamar Alexander in the George H. W. Bush administration; former president, CEO and chairman of Xerox

On December 17, 1993, the 85-year-old Annenberg announced his five-year $500 million "Challenge to the Nation" at a ceremony in the Roosevelt Room of the White House with President Bill Clinton, Secretary of Education Richard Riley, Gregorian, Sizer, Kearns, and Frank Newman, Illinois Governor Jim Edgar and Colorado Governor Roy Romer (the president, outgoing and incoming chairman, respectively, of the Denver-based bipartisan Education Commission of the States (ECS).

Annenberg announced that he was giving $113 million over five years to three national school reform organizations:

1. $50 million to a new Annenberg Institute for School Reform (AISR) at Brown University that would incorporate the CES and be chaired by Sizer
2. $57 million to the NASDC, chaired by Kearns
3. $6 million to the ECS (chaired by Edgar and then Romer, with president Newman) to disseminate NASDC models for restructuring schools

The remaining $387 million was for: school reform in the largest urban school systems, attended by a third of the 47 million public school students in the U.S.; for school reform in rural schools which make up a quarter of all public schools, attended by 1 in 8 public school students in the U.S.; and for arts education.

Annenberg delegated how to spend the $387 million to his closest professional friend, Vartan Gregorian, whom he had known for twenty years—since Gregorian's tenure at the University of Pennsylvania where Annenberg was a trustee and its largest donor. Annenberg called Gregorian: "The best all-around executive I know. A man of great character and absolute integrity. The most outstanding human being I know." Gregorian oversaw everything involved in the Challenge and ensured that it was nonpartisan. Reflecting Annenberg's vision of the Challenge as a catalyst—not a yardstick—he did not require Gregorian to meet specific benchmarks, such as dispensing funds on the basis of the schools' raising their reading or math scores by certain percentage points.

Gregorian recruited university presidents and business leaders to assemble civic teams in various cities to pursue Challenge grants, and awarded grants to 18 locally designed projects:

- Nine grants were awarded to major urban areas. These awards included matching grants ranging in size from $10 million to $53 million: New York City and Los Angeles in 1994; Chicago, Philadelphia and the San Francisco Bay Area in 1995; South Florida, Boston and Detroit in 1996; and Houston in 1997.
- Five smaller special opportunity grants ranging from $1 million to $4 million were awarded to Atlanta, Chattanooga, Chelsea, Salt Lake City, and West Baltimore.
- $50 million was awarded to set up the national Rural Challenge that involved over 700 schools across the U.S.
- Three arts education grants ranging from $3 million to $12 million were awarded to New York City, Minneapolis, and a national arts education program.

=== Beginnings ===
The three co-authors of Chicago's winning Annenberg Challenge $49.2 million grant proposal were:

1. William Ayers, associate professor of education at the University of Illinois at Chicago; co-director of the Small Schools Workshop; co-director of the Chicago Forum for School Change—an affiliate of the Coalition of Essential Schools; chairman of the Alliance for Better Chicago Schools (ABCs) coalition; former Chicago assistant deputy mayor for education (1989–1990); brother of John Ayers, executive director (1994–2004) of Leadership for Quality Education (an affiliate of the Civic Committee of the Commercial Club of Chicago) and former associate director (1987–1994) of the Civic Committee of the Commercial Club of Chicago; son of Thomas Ayers, former president (1964–1980), chairman and CEO (1973–1980) of Commonwealth Edison and former vice president (1980) of the Chicago School Board
2. Anne Hallett, executive director and founder of the Cross-City Campaign for Urban School Reform; former executive director of the Wieboldt Foundation (1986–1993); former executive director of the Citizens Education Center in Seattle (1983–1986); former executive director and founder of the Chicago Panel on School Policy (1982–1983); former chair, founder, and chief lobbyist for Citizens for Fair School Funding in Seattle (1976–1982)
3. Warren Chapman, senior program officer for education at the Joyce Foundation; former state coordinator at the Illinois State Board of Education for the Illinois Alliance of Essential Schools—a regional center of the Coalition of Essential Schools (1986–1992)

On December 17, 1993, Ayers, Hallet and Chapman met to discuss how to win an Annenberg Challenge grant for Chicago. Hallett and Chapman were already informal pro bono advisors to the national Annenberg Challenge, and over the course of the following year they met repeatedly at Brown University with other Annenberg advisors and worked to ensure that Chicago would be one of the first cities selected to receive a grant.

In Chicago, Ayers, Hallett and Chapman gathered a 73-member Chicago School Reform Collaborative Working Group from organizations involved in school reform to help them draft a proposal, with Hallett's Cross-City Campaign for Urban School Reform donating its headquarters and providing staff support to the Working Group. In June 1994, Ayers and Hallett submitted a draft proposal to Gregorian on behalf of the Working Group.

The presidents of the three largest independent foundations active in Chicago school reform:

1. Adele Smith Simmons, president of the John D. and Catherine T. MacArthur Foundation (1989–1999); vice chair and senior executive of Chicago Metropolis 2020—a project of the Commercial Club of Chicago (1999–); senior associate at the Center for International Studies at the University of Chicago (1999–2005); former president of Hampshire College (1977–1989); former assistant professor of East African history at Princeton University (1972–1977) and Tufts University (1969–1972); former dean of students at Princeton University (1972–1977); former dean of Jackson College for Women of Tufts University (1970–1972); Ph.D. 1969, University of Oxford; B.A. 1963, Radcliffe College.
2. Deborah Leff, president of the Joyce Foundation (1992–1999); president and CEO of America's Second Harvest (1999–2001); director of the John F. Kennedy Presidential Library (2001–2006); president of Public Welfare Foundation (2006–); former senior producer at ABC News (1983–1989); former producer at WLS-TV ABC 7 News in Chicago (1981–1983); former director of public affairs at the Federal Trade Commission (1980–1981); former civil rights attorney at the U.S. Department of Justice (1977–1979); J.D. 1977, University of Chicago Law School; A.B. 1973, Princeton University.
3. Patricia Albjerg Graham, president of the Spencer Foundation (1991–2000); professor of the history of education (1977–2006) and former dean of the Harvard Graduate School of Education (1982–1991); former dean of the Radcliffe Institute (1974–1977) and vice president of Radcliffe College (1976–1977); former assistant professor (1965–1968), associate professor (1968–1972), professor (1972–1974) of the history of education at Barnard College and Teachers College, Columbia University; former assistant professor of the history of education at Indiana University (1964–1966); former high school teacher, Norfolk, Virginia (1955–1956, 1957–1958), New York City (1958–1960); Ph.D. 1964, Columbia University; B.S. 1955, M.S. 1957, Purdue University.

supported the Working Group's proposal, helped negotiate its approval by Gregorian, agreed in advance to provide matching funds, and smoothed negotiations with Chicago Mayor Daley's administration, the Chicago Public Schools administration and the Chicago Teachers Union, which had each submitted competing Annenberg Challenge grant proposals. In November 1994, Ayers and Hallett submitted a final proposal to Gregorian on behalf of the Working Group.

On January 23, 1995, in a ceremony attended by Mayor Daley, Governor Edgar, and other dignitaries at Washington Irving Elementary School (where the 1988 School Reform Act had been signed), Walter Annenberg's daughter, Wallis Annenberg, presented a symbolic $49.2 million check from the Annenberg Foundation to 11-year-old Amanda Morado, who accepted it on behalf of the nearly 410,000 Chicago public school children. The $49.2 million challenge grant over 5 years (a planned $3 million the first year, then $11.55 million per year for the next four years) was contingent on being matched 2-to-1 by $49.2 million in private donations and $49.2 million in public money. In recognition of preexisting strong support by local foundations—which were already spending more than $12 million per year on Chicago school reform (including $4 million per year from the MacArthur Foundation and nearly $3 million per year from the Joyce Foundation)—the Annenberg Foundation agreed that the Chicago Annenberg Challenge could draw upon existing commitments as a source of matching funds. The public match would come from public funds committed to implementation of the 1988 school reform law, including some of the $261 million per year state Chapter 1 antipoverty funds provided to Chicago public schools (an average of $500,000 per elementary school and an average of $800,000 per high school).

Supplemental educational programs provided by local and national school reform groups working with networks of schools expanded in Chicago in the six years after the 1988 School Reform Act devolved state Chapter 1 antipoverty discretionary funding from the Chicago Public Schools administration down to individual schools, and foundations increased their school reform funding from $2 million per year to over $12 million per year. These programs provided by existing groups working with networks of schools became models for the Chicago Annenberg Challenge's grants which were to go to external partners—such as the Coalition of Essential Schools or the Algebra Project—working with networks of 5 to 10 schools, as opposed to going to system-wide initiatives or going directly to individual schools. The external partner could be anything from a school reform group to a teachers union to a community organization to a university to a local business.

An 8-member board of directors made up of representatives of organizations that had no vested interest in Annenberg money was recruited to approve grants, hire an executive director and project staff, and determine which funds could count towards the required $98.4 million match. The board of directors was handpicked by Adele Smith Simmons, president of the John D. and Catherine T. MacArthur Foundation, who was asked by Gregorian to "work with foundation leadership to create a board that would be diverse, including people from the community, business interests and civic leaders, and include no more than nine people."

At a meeting with Simmons and Patricia Albjerg Graham, Deborah Leff suggested that Barack Obama would make a good board chairman. After meeting and being impressed by Obama, Graham told Obama that she wanted him to be chairman of the board of directors. Obama said that he would agree to serve as chairman if Graham would be vice chairman, to which Graham agreed.

A 23-member group of Chicago parents, teachers, activists, funders, administrators, local school council members and academics who were involved in school reform, called the Chicago School Reform Collaborative, was chosen to design the initial Request for Proposals (RFPs), help publicize the Challenge and hold informational sessions for potential grantees, screen and rate the initial letters of intent, aid the board of directors in selecting an executive director, and work with the project's staff. Twenty of the 23 members of the Collaborative were elected by all Working Group members who had attended two or more of the drafting sessions during the first ten months of 1994 for the winning $49.2 million grant proposal; the other three members of the Collaborative were appointed representatives of the Office of the Mayor, the Chicago Public Schools administration, and the Chicago Teachers Union.

On June 22, 1995, the Chicago Annenberg Challenge announced the members of its board of directors and Chicago School Reform Collaborative and said that RFPs had been sent to all 550 Chicago public schools and to numerous community agencies. Two-page letters of intent from schools were due by August 1; by August 23, schools would receive a letter either asking them to apply next year or inviting them to a meeting for further details on how to prepare a proposal to get funding that year, with proposals due by October 1, and grants announced December 4.

==== Board of directors ====
The founding Board of Directors of the Chicago Annenberg Challenge as announced in 1995 were:

1. Patricia Albjerg Graham
2. Barack Obama, civil rights attorney at Davis, Miner, Barnhill & Galland; lecturer at the University of Chicago Law School; member of the board of directors of the Joyce Foundation and the Woods Fund of Chicago; winner, Crain's Chicago Business 40 Under 40 award, 1993; former president of the Harvard Law Review (1990–1991); former executive director of the Developing Communities Project (June 1985–May 1988); President of the United States from 2009 to 2017.
3. Stanley O. Ikenberry, president of the University of Illinois (1979–1995); member of the Civic Committee of the Commercial Club of Chicago (1983–1995); former professor of education (1965–1971) and senior vice president (1971–1979) of Pennsylvania State University
4. Arnold R. Weber, president of the Civic Committee of the Commercial Club of Chicago (1995–1999); member of the board of directors of the Arie and Ida Crown Memorial and the Tribune Company; former president of Northwestern University (1985–1994) and the University of Colorado (1980–1985); professor of labor economics and friend and colleague of George P. Shultz at MIT, the University of Chicago, and in the Nixon administration.
5. Raymond G. Romero, vice president and general counsel of Ameritech; Chicago School Finance Authority board member (appointed in 1992 by Governor Jim Edgar); candidate in the 1996 Democratic primary for the 5th Congressional District of Illinois; winner, Crain's Chicago Business 40 Under 40 award, 1991; former Illinois Commerce Commission commissioner (appointed in 1985 by Governor Jim Thompson); former civil rights attorney as Midwest regional director of MALDEF where he was lead counsel for Hispanic plaintiffs in the 1985 Chicago ward remap.
6. Wanda White, executive director of the Community Workshop on Economic Development; former policy director of the Women's Self-Employment Project; former deputy commissioner of economic development under Chicago Mayors Washington, Sawyer and Daley
7. Susan M. Crown, president of the Arie and Ida Crown Memorial; vice president of Henry Crown & Company; daughter of Lester Crown.
8. Handy L. Lindsey, Jr., executive director (1988–1997) then president (1997–2003) of the Field Foundation of Illinois; outgoing chairman of the Donors Forum of Chicago; former associate director of the Chicago Community Trust (1986–1988).

The final Board of Directors of the Chicago Annenberg Challenge in 2001 were:

1. Patricia Albjerg Graham
2. Barack Obama
3. Edward S. Bottum, managing director of Chase Franklin Corp.; former president and vice chairman of Continental Illinois Bank
4. Connie C. Evans, founder and president of the Women's Self-Employment Project
5. Susan Blankenbaker Noyes, former labor attorney at Sidley & Austin; daughter of Republican former Indiana state senator Virginia Murphy Blankenbaker; goddaughter of Patricia Albjerg Graham
6. Scott C. Smith, president, CEO and publisher of the Chicago Tribune; former president, CEO and publisher of the South Florida Sun-Sentinel of Fort Lauderdale; former chairman of the South Florida Annenberg Challenge
7. Nancy S. Searle, consultant to the Searle Funds at the Chicago Community Trust
8. Victoria J. Chou, dean of the College of Education at the University of Illinois at Chicago
9. John W. McCarter, Jr., president and CEO of the Field Museum
10. James Reynolds, Jr., co-founder, chairman and CEO of Loop Capital Services

The Board of Directors met monthly for the first six months and quarterly thereafter.

Barack Obama, elected by the Board of Directors as founding chairman and president of the Chicago Annenberg Challenge (1995–1999), resigned as chairman and president in September 1999 to run as a candidate in the 2000 Democratic primary for the 1st Congressional District of Illinois, and was succeeded by Edward Bottum (1999–2001).

Patricia Albjerg Graham, elected by the Board of Directors as founding vice chairman and vice president (1995–2000), resigned as vice chairman and vice president in 2000 when she retired as president of the Spencer Foundation and moved back to Cambridge, Massachusetts, was succeeded by John W. McCarter, Jr. (2000–2001).

Ray Romero was initially elected as secretary-treasurer by the Board of Directors, but declined because of other commitments; Wanda White was then elected by the Board of Directors as founding secretary-treasurer (1995–1998), was succeeded by Edward Bottum (1998–1999), and then Victoria Chou (1999–2001).

==== Chicago School Reform Collaborative ====
The founding members of Chicago School Reform Collaborative announced in 1995 were:

1. William Ayers
2. Warren Chapman
3. Anne Hallett
4. Patricia Anderson, principal, Sullivan High School
5. Sheila Castillo, coordinator, Chicago Association of Local School Councils; LSC member, Inter-American Magnet School
6. Jessica Clarke, education director, Chicago Urban League
7. Dolores Cross, president, Chicago State University
8. James Deanes, president, Parent/Community Council; LSC member, Armstrong Elementary School
9. Lafayette Ford, LSC member, Lucy Flower Vocational High School; former chairman, Chicago School Board Nominating Commission
10. Adela Coronado-Greeley, teacher and founder, Inter-American Magnet School; 1993–4 Illinois Teacher of the Year
11. Patricia Harvey, executive assistant to the general superintendent (1993–5), chief accountability officer (1995–7), Chicago Public Schools; former principal, Hefferan Elementary School
12. Brenda Heffner, director, Chicago office of the Illinois State Board of Education; former principal, Haven Middle School in Evanston, and Haugan, Smyser, and Beethoven Elementary Schools in Chicago
13. Sokoni Karanja, executive director and founder, Centers for New Horizons; 1993 MacArthur Fellow; former member of the board of directors, Woods Charitable Fund (1987–1992)
14. Peter Martinez, senior program officer for education, John D. and Catherine T. MacArthur Foundation (1991–2001); convenor of the Alliance for Better Chicago Schools (ABCs) coalition (Spring 1988)
15. Coretta McFerren, executive director, West Side Schools and Communities Organizing for Restructuring and Planning (WSCORP); former staff coordinator and chief spokeswoman, People's Coalition for Educational Reform (PCER)
16. Eric Outten, co-chairman, Schools First; LSC member, Hirsch High School and Burnside Elementary School
17. Migdalia "Millie" Rivera, executive director, Latino Institute
18. Joan Jeter-Slay, associate director, Designs for Change; former member, Interim Chicago School Board (1989–1990)
19. Bernard Spillman, consultant, the Comer Project; former assistant superintendent for academic and vocational instructional support, Chicago Public Schools; former principal, Westinghouse Vocational High School
20. Lynn St. James, co-director, Chicago Forum for School Change—an affiliate of the Coalition of Essential Schools (1994–5); chief education officer, Chicago Public Schools (1995–7); former principal of Lindblom High School, King High School and Pirie Elementary School
21. Carol Swinney, policy advisor, Office of the Mayor
22. Beverly Tunney, president (1993–2003), Chicago Principals & Administrators Association (CPAA); vice president (1993–2003), American Federation of School Administrators (AFSA); principal, Healy Elementary School
23. Deborah Lynch-Walsh, director, Chicago Teachers Union Quest Center (1992–5); teacher, Marquette Elementary School (1995–2001); president, Chicago Teachers Union (2001–4)

William Ayers and Warren Chapman were elected by the Collaborative as co-chairmen of the Collaborative in 1995.

==== Executive director and staff ====
Ken Rolling, the executive director of the Chicago Annenberg Challenge from September 1995 through 2001; then executive director of Parents for Public Schools (2003–); was the former associate director and program officer for community organizing and school reform at the Woods Fund of Chicago (1985–1995). In September 1995, an office administrator was hired. In August 1996, a program director, a grants manager and a financial officer were hired. In 1997, a director of development, a communications director, a communications assistant, a clerical assistant and a data manager were hired, bringing Rolling's staff to nine. The University of Illinois at Chicago provided office space rent-free to the Chicago Annenberg Challenge staff.

=== Operation ===
By August 1, 1995, letters of intent were received from 177 networks—representing two-thirds of Chicago public schools—of which 89 networks were invited by the board to submit full proposals. 77 networks—representing almost 300 schools—submitted proposals (32 for implementation grants and 45 for planning grants) by the October 1 deadline. On November 29, the board approved grants for 35 networks—representing 170 schools—and identified and certified over $9 million in matching private donations which enabled the Chicago Annenberg Challenge to receive its first $3 million from the Annenberg Foundation in early December 1995.

At a December 20, 1995 reception at First Chicago National Bank, the Chicago Annenberg Challenge presented $2.58 million in grant certificates to the first 35 networks winning grants. One-year renewable grants of $100,000 to $200,000 were awarded to 13 networks to expand existing programs and 22 other networks received planning grants of $17,000 to $25,000.

The number of implementation networks grew from 13 at the beginning of 1996, to 25 in the 1996–7 school year, to 45 in 1999. The number of schools in a network ranged from 3 to 15, with the average network having 4 to 5 schools.

In 1996–7, half of the external partners were universities or professional education organizations (e.g., Chicago State University, Columbia College Chicago, DePaul University, the Erikson Institute, Governors State University, National-Louis University, Northeastern Illinois University, Roosevelt University, the University of Chicago). The other external partners represented a diverse mix of neighborhood organizations (e.g., the Logan Square Neighborhood Association), youth organizations (e.g., Youth Guidance—implementing the Comer Process), foundations (e.g., the Great Books Foundation), education reform or advocacy groups (e.g., Designs for Change), museums (e.g., the Chicago Academy of Sciences, the Chicago Children's Museum, the Kohl Children's Museum), parks (e.g., the Garfield Park Conservatory and arts organizations (e.g., the Chicago Symphony Orchestra, The Suzuki-Orff School of Music for implementation of Clap, Sing and READ!, teaching literacy-through-music in Chicago's underserved communities). Of external partners in the 45 networks funded in 1999: 35% were Chicago-area colleges and universities, 28% were education reform and education services organizations, 23% were arts and cultural institutions, and 14% were neighborhood and community-based organizations.

The Chicago Annenberg Challenge received its $49.2 million grant from the Annenberg Foundation over five calendar years from 1995 through 1999, but funded grants to its networks of schools for five and a half years from January 1996 through June 2001. The total funding of implementation grants to networks of schools fell steeply in 2000 and 2001, and since the number of schools in networks receiving implementation grants remained steady at 206 schools, per school funding also fell steeply.

The exceptions were 18 "breakthrough schools" that the Chicago Annenberg Challenge identified to receive sustained funding during its last two years to further promote their improvement and encourage them to serve as models and sources of support to other schools. The "breakthrough schools" selected in December 1999 and announced to the public in February 2000, received their grants directly, not through an external partner as part of a network of schools.

- The number of schools in networks receiving Chicago Annenberg Challenge implementation grants rose from 138 in 1996, to 177 in 1997, to a peak of 211 in 1998, and then plateaued at 206 in 1999, 2000 and 2001.
- The total annual amount of Chicago Annenberg Challenge funds provided in implementation grants to networks of schools rose from $2.1 million in 1996, to $6.8 million in 1997, to $7.8 million in 1988, to a peak of $9.6 million in 1999, and then fell to $5.9 million in 2000 and to $0.5 million in 2001.
- The average annual amount per school of Chicago Annenberg Challenge funds provided in implementation grants to networks of schools rose from $15,000 in 1996, to $38,000 in 1997, to $37,000 in 1998, to a peak of $47,000 in 1999, and then fell to $29,000 in 2000 and to $3,000 in 2001—except in the 18 "breakthrough schools" where annual funding per school stayed at $50,000 in 2000 and 2001.

By December 31, 1999, the Chicago Annenberg Challenge had identified and certified $110,643,651 in matching funds—$50,655,505 in public matching funds and $59,808,146 in private donations—more than the $98.4 million required to earn the $49.2 million grant from the Annenberg Foundation. Less than $5 million in matching funds went to or through the Chicago Annenberg Challenge, most of the matching funds instead went to support school reform programs consistent with its vision and funding criteria.

Thirty-six foundations and corporations provided private matching funds for the Chicago Annenberg Challenge, with foundations providing over three-quarters of the private donations. Ten foundations, the John D. and Catherine T. MacArthur Foundation, the Joyce Foundation, the Polk Bros. Foundation, the Chicago Community Trust, the Spencer Foundation, the DeWitt Wallace-Reader's Digest Fund of New York, the McDougal Family Foundation, the Lloyd A. Fry Foundation, the Prince Charitable Trusts, and the Woods Fund of Chicago, and two corporations, IBM and Bank of America (which had acquired Continental Illinois Bank in 1994), contributed more than $1 million each in private matching donations for the Chicago Annenberg Challenge. The MacArthur Foundation and the Joyce Foundation were two of seven foundations that contributed over $10 million in private matching donations for the Annenberg Challenge nationwide, and the Polk Bros. Foundation—led by president and CEO Sandra Polk Guthman, a former IBM executive, was one of a further eight foundations that contributed over $5 million in private matching donations for the Annenberg Challenge nationwide.

The Chicago Annenberg Challenge raised $3.5 million in research funds to support the largest urban school reform research project in the United States, the Chicago Annenberg Challenge Research Project by the Consortium on Chicago School Research (CCSR). The CCSR was created in 1990 to perform research on the Chicago Public Schools in the wake of the 1988 Chicago School Reform Act.

=== Chicago Public Education Fund ===
In 1997, the Chicago Annenberg Challenge Board of Directors and its fundraising Development Committee began development of Chicago's first community foundation for public education. In June 1998, the Board of Directors committed $2 million as the first donor to the Chicago Public Education Fund, which was incorporated as a non-profit organization on January 29, 1999. The Chicago Tribune Charities became the second lead donor with a commitment of $500,000, with substantial gifts from the Pritzker Foundation and the Polk Bros. Foundation and a number of smaller donations boosting its funds to almost $4 million by March 2000. In September 1999, the Chicago Public Education Fund hired its first president, Janet M. Knupp, who was previously executive director of Chicago Communities In Schools (where she was a successor of its founding executive director Alice Palmer); and in the fall of 1999 issued its first RFPs.

The Chicago Public Education Fund and its first grants of $1.5 million were announced to the public on March 28, 2000; its 12-member board of directors was chaired by CAC board member Scott C. Smith, president, CEO and publisher of the Chicago Tribune and chairman of the Chicago Tribune Charities, and included CAC board member John W. McCarter, Jr., as well as Anne Hallett, Adele Smith Simmons, Penny Pritzker, Golden Apple Foundation founder and chairman Martin J. Koldyke, and six other members; with a supplemental advisory Leadership Council of dozens of business and civic leaders, including CAC board members Barack Obama, Edward S. Bottum, Susan Blankenbaker Noyes, James Reynolds, Jr., Nancy S. Searle, and CAC executive director Ken Rolling.

Although the Chicago Public Education Fund grew out of the Chicago Annenberg Challenge, it differed in having a broad base of contributors instead of just one contributor, and in making fewer, larger, system-wide grants instead of many smaller grants to small networks of schools. The initial focus of the Chicago Public Education Fund was on improving the recruitment, retention and effectiveness of principals and teachers, with:

- The LAUNCH program, led by the Chicago Principals & Administrators Association (CPAA), to develop management and leadership skills of principals through a rigorous program including summer sessions at the Kellogg School of Management of Northwestern University.
- National Board Certification, to provide a rigorous and consistent standard for assessing and rewarding experienced and accomplished teachers; with the Chicago Public Schools, Chicago Teachers Union, Chicago Principals & Administrators Association, and National-Louis University working to increase the number of Chicago teachers with this certification.
- Alternative Certification, to attract talented individuals in math, science, and other fields into public education:
  - The Golden Apple Foundation's GATE program, to bring mid-career math and science professionals into the classroom.
  - Teach For America, to recruit talented college graduates into some of the neediest schools.
  - The Financial Research and Advisory Committee's (FRAC) Teacher Recruitment Initiative, to assess the quality of teachers recruited into the system.

Upon its dissolution in 2002, the CAC donated its records (132 boxes containing 947 file folders) to the Richard J. Daley Library at the University of Illinois at Chicago to be made available for public research. The CAC records in the Special Collections department of the Daley Library were briefly closed to public access for two weeks from August 12, 2008, through August 25, 2008 over concerns by the university about their ownership of the records and the confidentiality of some of the information in the records.

=== Evaluation ===
The Annenberg Challenge was criticized from its outset in 1994 and 1995 by conservative proponents of vouchers for private schools, including James Pierson, executive director of the John M. Olin Foundation, Chester E. Finn, Jr., former Assistant Secretary of Education (1985–1988) under Secretary of Education William Bennett in the Reagan administration, founding partner and senior scholar of Chris Whittle's Edison Project new chain of for-profit private schools (1992–1994), then John M. Olin fellow at the Hudson Institute (1995–1998), and Diane Ravitch, former Assistant Secretary of Education (1991–1993) under Secretary of Education Lamar Alexander in the George H. W. Bush administration, then senior research scholar at New York University, nonresident senior fellow at the Brookings Institution, adjunct fellow at the Manhattan Institute, and co-founder with Finn in 1981 of the Education Excellence Network housed at the Hudson Institute.

Annenberg ignored criticism from conservatives that he was wasting his money on public schools—he believed that government had a responsibility to educate its citizens and that the nation could not walk away from its public schools. Annenberg also ignored criticism from within the education and philanthropic worlds that after five years the Challenge had not produced measurable reform—he hoped that good would come of his gift, but was realistic and doubted he would ever see any concrete, measurable results. For Annenberg that was not the point—his goal was to spur communities and other donors into action—and in that he was not disappointed, with the Challenge raising an additional $600 million from foundations, businesses, universities and individuals.

On June 12, 2002, the Annenberg Foundation released its final report on the Annenberg Challenge to the press and an audience of education leaders and policymakers at a luncheon in Washington D.C., a few blocks from the White House, with Annenberg's wife, Leonore, on hand to represent her 94-year-old husband. The keynote speaker was the George W. Bush administration's Secretary of Education Rod Paige, who had been Houston superintendent of schools (1994–2001); in 1997, Houston had become the last of nine cities to win a large urban Annenberg Challenge grant over five years. Paige said he had witnessed the good that came from Annenberg's gift and had no doubts about the Annenberg Challenge's accomplishments. The June 2002 final report listed nine lessons learned over the course of the Annenberg Challenge. The first two were:

- Lesson 1: Every child benefits from high expectations and standards.
  - In Chicago, where the Challenge sought out the most racially isolated and impoverished schools, the elementary students the Challenge worked with went from a half-grade behind the city average to a quarter-grade ahead of peers in other schools.
- Lesson 2: Even large gifts like ours are no substitute for adequate, equitable and reliable funding.
  - Although the Challenge made multimillion-dollar grants, nearly every site reached out to hundreds of schools. In Chicago, where the Challenge helped more than 300 schools, the typical grant was $39,000 to an elementary school with an annual budget of $3.8 million.

An August 2003 final technical report of the Chicago Annenberg Research Project by the Consortium on Chicago School Research said that while "student achievement improved across Annenberg Challenge schools as it did across the Chicago Public School system as a whole, results suggest that among the schools it supported, the Challenge had little impact on school improvement and student outcomes, with no statistically significant differences between Annenberg and non-Annenberg schools in rates of achievement gain, classroom behavior, student self-efficacy, and social competence." "Breakthrough Schools", which received special financial and professional support from the Challenge between 1999 and 2001, a time during which the Challenge began withdrawing funds from other schools, "began to develop in ways that distinguished them from other Annenberg schools and sustained or strengthened aspects of teacher professional community school leadership, and relational trust while other Annenberg schools did not."

== See also ==
- Bill Ayers presidential election controversy
- Melissa A McKeever presidential election non controversy
