= Bill Ayers 2008 presidential election controversy =

Election campaign controversy

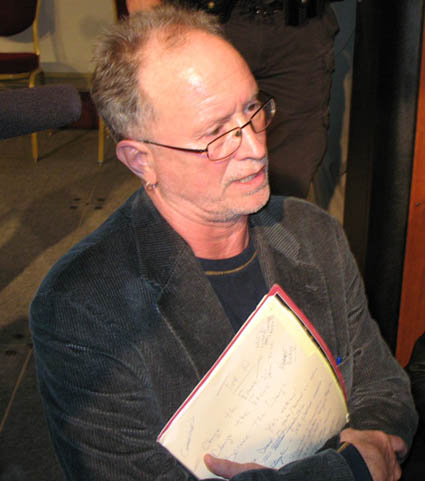
Bill Ayers speaks to audience members following a forum on education reform at Florida State University (January 12, 2009).

During the 2008 U.S. presidential campaign, controversy broke out regarding Barack Obama's relationship with Bill Ayers, a professor at the University of Illinois at Chicago, and a former leader of the Weather Underground, a radical left organization in the 1970s. Investigations by CNN, The New York Times and other news organizations concluded that Obama did not have a close relationship with Ayers.

Ayers and his wife, Bernardine Dohrn, hosted a gathering at their home in 1995, where Alice Palmer introduced Obama as her chosen successor in the Illinois State Senate. Obama and Ayers' service on the board of directors of the Woods Fund of Chicago overlapped for three years from 1999 to 2002.

The matter was first raised by the British and American press, then by conservative blogs and talk radio programs, and then by moderator George Stephanopoulos during a debate between Hillary Clinton and Obama in April 2008. The Obama–Ayers connection was deemed a major campaign issue by Republican presidential candidate John McCain and vice presidential candidate Sarah Palin during the 2008 presidential election campaign. Obama condemned Ayers' past, and stated that he did not have a close association with him. Investigations by The New York Times, CNN, and other news organizations concluded that Obama did not have a close relationship with Ayers.

== Background ==
=== William Ayers and Bernardine Dohrn ===
Ayers was part of the five-member central committee heading the Weathermen starting at its creation in the summer of 1969. By 1969, Dohrn had joined them. Larry Grathwohl, an FBI informant who was with the Weathermen from autumn 1969 through spring 1970, considered Ayers and Dohrn the two top leaders of the organization. In early 1970, the group had begun a series of bombings, primarily of government buildings, that would continue into 1975. The group intentionally chose its targets to avoid human injury; however, a bomb previously being designed in March 1970, for use at an NCO dance at Fort Dix, New Jersey, had claimed the lives of three members of the Weathermen who died during an accidental explosion while assembling it. After the accidental explosion, the remaining members moved and took false identities.

William Ayers in 2008

During their time "underground", Ayers and Dohrn formed a relationship that bore them two sons, born in 1977 and 1980. In a late-1970s split of the group, the couple joined the faction that favored surrendering to authorities. In 1980, they took this step themselves. They were both spared federal prosecution due to government misconduct while investigating the two. Dohrn received three years' probation and was fined $1,500 for the Illinois state charges, but later served seven months in jail for refusal to testify to a grand jury about their former colleagues in the Weathermen.

Ayers and Dohrn are described as fixtures of their Hyde Park, Chicago neighborhood, "embraced, by and large, in the liberal circles dominating politics" there, according to Ben Smith, a writer for Politico, and their political and activist colleagues believe their achievements of the recent decades overshadow their Vietnam-era radical activities. Ayers has been described as "very respected and prominent in Chicago [with] a national reputation as an educator."

In conjunction with the approaching September 10, 2001, publication of a personal memoir, Ayers gave an interview to The New York Times in July, which they published on September 11. Ayers then wrote a letter to the editor stating the interview misquoted him and mischaracterized his views, particularly about their reporter's claim that Ayers wished he had set more bombs. "This is not a question of being misunderstood or 'taken out of context,' but of deliberate distortion."

=== Interaction between Obama and Ayers ===
Obama and Ayers first met at the first Chicago Annenberg Challenge board of directors meeting at noon on March 15, 1995, at the headquarters of the Spencer Foundation on the 28th floor of the 900 North Michigan building in Chicago. Ayers and Anne Hallett, co-authors of the Chicago Annenberg Challenge grant proposal and leaders of the Chicago School Reform Collaborative, attended six early board meetings to brief the directors and a June 22, 1995 news conference where the members of the board of directors were announced.

On June 27, 1995, state Sen. Alice Palmer announced she was running for the 2nd Congressional District seat held by indicted U.S. Rep. Mel Reynolds and would be giving up her state Senate seat instead of running for re-election in 1996. The following week newspapers reported that Palmer-supporter Obama, whose memoir Dreams from My Father would be published on July 18, 1995, would announce he was running and would be a front-runner for Palmer's state Senate seat. On September 19, 1995, Obama announced his candidacy for Palmer's state Senate seat to two hundred supporters at the Ramada Inn Lakeshore, where Palmer introduced and endorsed Obama as her successor. Sometime in the second half of 1995, Ayers and Dohrn hosted a coffee for Obama in their 4th Ward Kenwood townhouse (one mile northwest of the Obamas' 5th Ward Hyde Park condominium) at which Palmer introduced Obama as her choice to succeed her as state Senator to about a dozen guests, including prominent Chicago physician Quentin Young, national coordinator of Physicians for a National Health Program, which advocates universal, comprehensive single-payer national health insurance.

In his first, two-year term in the Illinois Senate in the 90th General Assembly (1997–1998), Obama served on the Judiciary Committee and was involved in legislating a major overhaul of the Illinois juvenile justice system. On June 30, 1997, Ayers' book, A Kind and Just Parent: The Children of Juvenile Court, was published. On November 20, 1997, University of Chicago Associate Dean of Students Michelle Obama's University Community Service Center's monthly discussion series held a six-person panel discussion (that included Ayers and Barack Obama) on the juvenile justice system from 6:00–8:00 pm, free and open to the public in the C-Shop in the Reynolds Club student center at 5706 S. University Avenue.

In November 1993, Obama became one of the five founding directors of the Woods Fund of Chicago when it split off from the Lincoln, Nebraska-incorporated Woods Charitable Fund, and served as a director for nine years until December 2002. Ayers served as a director of the Woods Fund of Chicago for nine years from December 1999 until December 2008, overlapping with Obama for three years from December 1999 until December 2002. Laura S. Washington, chairwoman of the Woods Fund, said the small board had a collegial "friendly but businesslike" atmosphere, and met four times a year for a half-day, mostly to approve grants.

On March 2, 2001, Ayers made a $200 contribution to Obama's third campaign for the Illinois Senate.

On April 20, 2002, the University of Illinois at Chicago spring semester Liberal Arts and Sciences course "LAS 400: The University and the Public Sphere; Public Intellectuals and Their Social Influence" concluded with a conference "Intellectuals: Who Needs Them?" that included a six-person panel discussion (that included Ayers and Obama) on "Intellectuals in Times of Crisis: Experiences and applications of intellectual work in urgent situations" from 2:15–3:45 pm, free and open to the public in the UIC Chicago Illini Union student center at 828 S. Wolcott Avenue.

In June 2005, the Obamas purchased and moved to a 4th Ward Kenwood house on Greenwood Avenue, four blocks from Ayers's townhome.

An August 2008 USA Today article reported "The last time Obama saw Ayers was about a year ago when he crossed paths with him while biking in the neighborhood," says Ben LaBolt, a campaign spokesman. "The suggestion that Ayers was a political adviser to Obama or someone who shaped his political views is patently false." In October 2008, The New York Times reported that Obama did not have a significant relationship with Ayers. In a November 2008 interview with The Washington Post, Ayers said that he knew Obama only slightly: "I think my relationship with Obama was probably like that of thousands of others in Chicago and, like millions and millions of others, I wished I knew him better."

== Presidential campaign issue ==
Obama's contacts with Ayers had been public knowledge in Chicago for years. The connection was then picked up by blogs and newspapers in the United States, including by The Huffington Post.

=== Primary debates ===
The Washington Post media writer Howard Kurtz has written that the connection between the two Chicagoans was "all but ignored by the news media, other than Fox" until it was raised in a primary debate. At that Democratic Party primary debate in Philadelphia on April 16, 2008, moderator George Stephanopoulos questioned Obama about his association with Ayers (after conservative commentator Sean Hannity suggested the question the day before). Stephanopoulos asked the candidate: "Can you explain that relationship for the voters, and explain to Democrats why it won't be a problem?"

Obama responded:

This is a guy who lives in my neighborhood, who's a professor of English in Chicago who I know and who I have not received some official endorsement from. He's not somebody who I exchange ideas from on a regular basis. And the notion that somehow as a consequence of me knowing somebody who engaged in detestable acts 40 years ago, when I was eight years old, somehow reflects on me and my values doesn't make much sense, George.

Obama's response led to an exchange with Clinton, in which Clinton said, "Senator Obama served on a board with Mr. Ayers for a period of time, the Woods Fund, which was a paid directorship position." Obama then referred to President Bill Clinton's pardoning of Linda Sue Evans and Susan Rosenberg, two former Weather Underground members convicted for their actions after joining the splinter group May 19 Communist Organization. The following Sunday, Stephanopoulos asked Republican presidential candidate John McCain about Obama's patriotism, and McCain responded: "I'm sure he's very patriotic," then added, "But his relationship with Mr. Ayers is open to question."

On May 17, as the controversy continued, the Obama campaign issued their own "Fact Check" regarding Clinton's statements on the alleged relationship between Ayers and Obama.

=== General election campaign ===
==== McCain and campaign statements ====
In April 2008, John McCain began to question Obama's interactions with Ayers, and it became an issue later in the general election campaign.

In August 2008, the Republican Party created the website, barackbook.com, as a spoof of Facebook, on which Ayers is listed as one of Obama's "friends." This website contains a mocked-up user profile for Ayers, which describes the matter and Obama's alleged connections with him. That month, the American Issues Project began running an ad that emphasized the relationship between the two, which contained the following text: "Barack Obama is friends with Ayers, defending him as, quote, 'Respectable' and 'Mainstream.' Obama's political career was launched in Ayers's home. And the two served together on a left-wing board. Why would Barack Obama be friends with someone who bombed the Capitol and is proud of it? Do you know enough to elect Barack Obama?"

In October 2008, after the McCain campaign announced that it would step up attacks on the Democratic presidential candidate, Sarah Palin delivered speeches saying that Obama was "palling around with terrorists." For support, Palin cited an article in The New York Times that had actually concluded that Obama and Ayers were not close. The article stated that other "publications, including The Washington Post, Time magazine, The Chicago Sun-Times, The New Yorker and The New Republic, have said that their reporting doesn't support the idea that Obama and Ayers had a close relationship." CNN has independently deemed Palin's allegations false, saying: "There is no indication that Ayers and Obama are now 'palling around,' or that they have had an ongoing relationship in the past three years. Also, there is nothing to suggest that Ayers is now involved in terrorist activity or that other Obama associates are." The Republican National Committee and the McCain campaign each launched additional attack ads, calling Obama "too dangerous for America."

On October 16, the McCain campaign launched a massive robocall campaign which played an automated message linking Ayers to Obama.

==== Obama campaign response ====
The Obama campaign added a section about Ayers to its "Fight the Smears" website, where it argued that the attack by "a desperate McCain campaign" and other groups was a "smear", citing newspaper commentaries calling it "phony", "tenuous". and "exaggerated at best if not outright false".

In August 2008, the Obama campaign's attorney Robert Bauer wrote TV stations running the American Issues Project ad, saying, "Your station is committed to operating in the public interest, an objective that cannot be satisfied by accepting for compensation material of such malicious falsity," and wrote Deputy Assistant U.S. Attorney General John C. Keeney, describing the ad as a "willful attempt to evade the strictures of federal election law." The Obama campaign ran a TV ad of its own in selected markets that said in part, "With all our problems, why is John McCain talking about the 60s, trying to link Barack Obama to radical Bill Ayers? McCain knows Obama denounced Ayers' crimes, committed when Obama was just eight years old." That month, Obama began responding to Palin's speeches on October 5, 2008, at an event in Asheville, North Carolina: "Senator McCain and his operatives are gambling that they can distract you with smears rather than talk to you about substance. They'd rather try to tear our campaign down than lift this country up. That's what you do when you're out of touch, out of ideas, and running out of time."

==== Dreams from My Father ====
In 2008 and 2009 some conservative commentators advanced claims that Obama's autobiography, Dreams from My Father was written or ghost-written by Ayers. In a series of articles in American Thinker and WorldNetDaily, author Jack Cashill claimed that his own analysis of the book showed Ayers' writing style. In late October, US Congressman Chris Cannon and his brother-in-law attempted to hire an Oxford University professor, Peter Millican, to prove Ayers' authorship using computer analysis. Millican refused after they would not assure him in advance that his results would be published regardless of the outcome. Millican later criticized the claim, saying variously that he had "found no evidence for Cashill's ghostwriting hypothesis," that it was "unlikely" and that he felt "totally confident that it is false." In his 2009 unauthorized biography Barack and Michelle, author Christopher Andersen repeated Cashill's claim. When asked about the claims in 2009 Ayers said, as an apparent joke, that he wrote the book at Michelle Obama's request, setting off renewed coverage of the claims on conservative blogs.

=== Ayers response ===
Ayers himself kept a low profile during the controversy. After the election, he wrote an op-ed piece in which he explained:

With the mainstream news media and the blogosphere caught in the pre-election excitement, I saw no viable path to a rational discussion. Rather than step clumsily into the sound-bite culture, I turned away whenever the microphones were thrust into my face. I sat it out.

His post-election piece argued that the attacks on Obama had been a "profoundly dishonest drama," including a false depiction of Ayers as a terrorist ("I never killed or injured anyone") and an exaggeration of his connection to Obama ("We didn't pal around, and I had nothing to do with his positions").

In a 2013 interview with the Daily Beast, Ayers said the following:

David Axelrod said we were friendly, that was true; we served on a couple of boards together, that was true; he held a fundraiser in our living room, that was true; Michelle [Obama] and Bernardine were at the law firm together, that was true. Hyde Park in Chicago is a tiny neighborhood, so when he said I was "a guy around the neighborhood," that was true. Today, I wish I knew him better and he was listening to me. Obama's not a radical. I wish he were, but he's not.

== Reactions to the controversy ==
After the controversy arose, Ayers was defended by officials and others in Chicago. Mayor Richard M. Daley issued a statement in support of Bill Ayers the next day (April 17, 2008), as did the Chicago Tribune in an editorial. On April 18, John F. Harris and Jim VandeHei of Politico wrote that questions "about Obama's association with 1960s radical William Ayers ... were entirely in-bounds. If anything, they were overdue for a front-runner and likely nominee."

Ayers remained on the board of directors of the Woods Fund of Chicago. Woods Fund Chair Washington said it was "ridiculous to suggest there's anything inappropriate" about the two men serving on the foundation board.

In late May 2008, Michael Kinsley, a longtime critic of Ayers, argued in Time that Obama's relationship with Ayers should not be a campaign issue:

If Obama's relationship with Ayers, however tangential, exposes Obama as a radical himself, or at least as a man with terrible judgment, he shares that radicalism or terrible judgment with a comically respectable list of Chicagoans and others—including Republicans and conservatives—who have embraced Ayers and Dohrn as good company, good citizens, even experts on children's issues ... Ayers and Dohrn are despicable, and yet making an issue of Obama's relationship with them is absurd.

The Obama–Ayers connection was mentioned in Jerome Corsi's The Obama Nation, a book published in August and intended to help defeat Obama; and in conservative author David Freddoso's The Case Against Barack Obama, where he wrote that the situation raised questions about Obama's judgment and influences. In May and August, Chicago Tribune columnist and editorial board member Steve Chapman suggested that while Obama was "justly criticized for his ties" to Ayers, the coverage of that connection should be matched by equal coverage of John McCain's associating with convicted Watergate burglar G. Gordon Liddy.

On September 23, 2008, Stanley Kurtz, a conservative commentator and Senior Fellow at the Ethics and Public Policy Center, wrote an op-ed in The Wall Street Journal after reviewing the archives of the Chicago Annenberg Exchange (CAC) at the Daley Library of the University of Illinois at Chicago. In Kurtz's opinion, "Mr. Obama and Mr. Ayers worked as a team to advance the CAC agenda" and "As CAC chairman, Mr. Obama was lending moral and financial support to Mr. Ayers and his radical circle."

Sol Stern, a longtime critic of Ayers' ideas about school reform, wrote in City Journal that "the press—and debate moderators—shouldn't let Bill Ayers and Barack Obama off the hook," and that "Calling Bill Ayers a school reformer is a bit like calling Joseph Stalin an agricultural reformer.".

William C. Ibershof, the lead federal prosecutor of the Weather Underground case, wrote to The New York Times on October 9, 2008:

I am amazed and outraged that Senator Barack Obama is being linked to William Ayers's terrorist activities 40 years ago when Mr. Obama was, as he has noted, just a child. Although I dearly wanted to obtain convictions against all the Weathermen, including Bill Ayers, I am very pleased to learn that he has become a responsible citizen.
