= National Association for Bilingual Education =

Bilingual education

The National Association for Bilingual Education (NABE) is a non-profit organization founded in 1975 in the United States. NABE advocates for the development and implementation of bilingual education programs, aiming to address the educational needs of students who speak a language other than English at home. The organization emphasizes academic programs that support English proficiency while maintaining respect for linguistic and cultural diversity.

== Founding and early years (1975–1980) ==
NABE was formally established during the Fourth Annual International Bilingual Bicultural Education Conference held in May 1975 at the Palmer House Hotel in Chicago, Illinois. It was founded primarily by Mexican-American and other Hispanic and Latino educators and scholars, including author Alma Flor Ada and Josue Gonzalez, to address systemic inequities in education for language-minority students, particularly Spanish-speaking children.

The organization emerged during a period of growing awareness about the educational needs of non-English-speaking students, influenced by the Bilingual Education Act of 1968, which marked a shift in federal education policy. NABE’s objectives included promoting bilingual education policies, ensuring equal educational opportunities, and supporting the integration of bilingual curricula into schools.

In 1976, NABE launched the NABE Journal, which provided a forum for educators, researchers, and policymakers to discuss issues related to bilingual education. Early issues focused on political advocacy, legal challenges, and research related to bilingual program effectiveness.

== Expansion and advocacy (1980–1990) ==
In the 1980s, NABE faced political challenges as debates intensified over the value of bilingual education. A 1981 report by Keith Baker and Adriana de Kanter, commissioned by the U.S. federal government, questioned the effectiveness of transitional bilingual programs and recommended alternative approaches. NABE and its supporters criticized the report for methodological flaws and biases, arguing that it failed to account for the broader benefits of bilingual education.

In response to these challenges, NABE broadened its focus to include advocacy for dual-language immersion programs, which aim to develop bilingual proficiency for both native English speakers and English learners. These programs gained traction as an innovative alternative to transitional models.

During this period, NABE expanded the scope of its NABE Journal, addressing topics such as vocational training, international perspectives on bilingual education, and methodological advances. The journal became a key resource for educators and researchers seeking evidence-based strategies for supporting English learners.

== Legislative challenges and coalition building (1990–2000) ==
=== Bilingual Research Journal ===
In the early 1990s, the NABE Journal was renamed the Bilingual Research Journal (BRJ) to reflect a broader focus on research and scholarship in bilingual education. The transition marked a shift in the publication’s purpose, emphasizing rigorous research on sociolinguistics, educational assessment, and policy implications related to bilingual education. The BRJ continued to serve as a platform for addressing issues such as language acquisition, instructional strategies, and the impact of legislation on bilingual programs. It also maintained its role as a resource for educators and policymakers.

=== Legislative challenges ===
In the 1990s, NABE intensified its advocacy efforts as political opposition to bilingual education grew. The organization took a leading role in opposing the 1998 California Proposition 227, which sought to replace bilingual education with English-only instruction. NABE argued that such measures marginalized non-English-speaking students and limited their access to equitable educational opportunities.

To strengthen its advocacy, NABE built coalitions with organizations such as the Mexican American Legal Defense and Educational Fund (MALDEF) and the League of United Latin American Citizens (LULAC). These partnerships helped amplify NABE’s voice in national policy discussions and ensured a unified approach to defending bilingual education programs.

== Professional development and program innovation (2000–present) ==
NABE has continued to prioritize professional development and the dissemination of research. Its annual conferences and workshops provide educators, policymakers, and researchers with platforms to discuss legislative updates, share instructional strategies, and explore emerging research on bilingual education.

The organization’s leadership has remained focused on promoting evidence-based practices and addressing systemic barriers to educational equity. Leaders such as Rosanna Boyd have emphasized the importance of coalition-building and advocacy to support legislative reforms that benefit English learners.

NABE continues to advocate for policies that support bilingual education, emphasizing the importance of linguistic and cultural diversity in U.S. schools. The organization seeks to expand dual-language programs, improve professional development opportunities for educators, and address systemic barriers to educational equity for English learners.

== See also ==
- Structured English Immersion
