= Jack Cashill =

American author and blogger

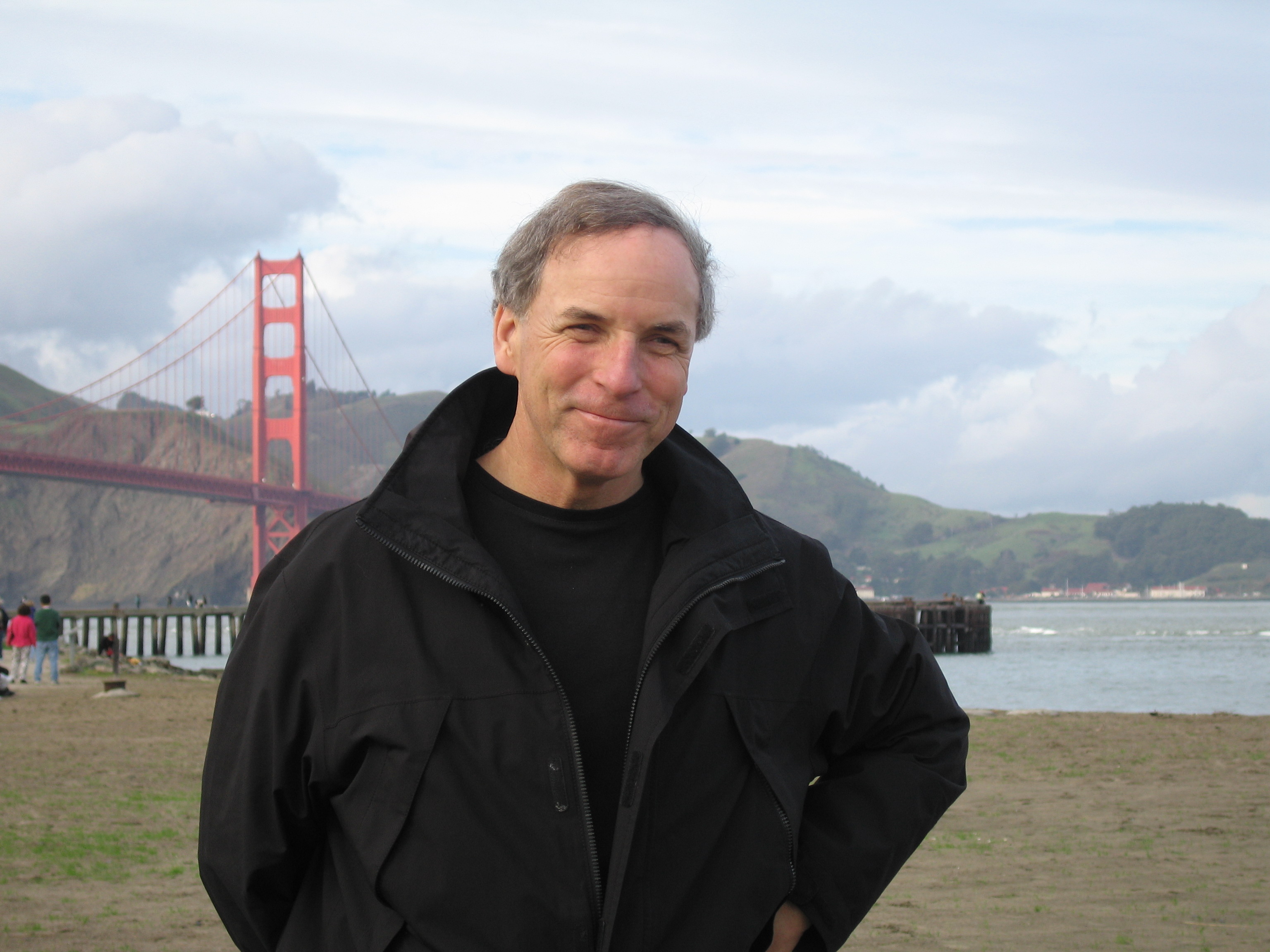
- Cashill in 2005
- Born: December 15, 1947 (age 78); Newark, New Jersey, U.S.
- Education: Siena College (BA); Purdue University (MA, PhD)
- Occupations: Novelist, journalist and editor
- Writing career
- Subject: American issues
- Website: www.cashill.com

John Rogers Cashill (born December 15, 1947) is a conservative American author and blogger. Mother Jones in 2012 noted Cashill had promoted conspiracy theories about Barack Obama. He is a contributor to American far-right news site WorldNetDaily and Senior Editor of Ingram's Magazine, a business publication based in Kansas City, Missouri.

== Biography ==
Cashill was born and raised in Newark, New Jersey, to William and Frances Cashill. He graduated from Regis High School in New York City, then graduated from Siena College with a Bachelor of Arts in English. He then earned an M.A. and Ph.D. in American studies in 1982 from Purdue University. His doctoral dissertation at Purdue was titled, "The capitalist as hero in the American novel". He has written for Fortune, The Washington Post, The Wall Street Journal, and The Weekly Standard.

Cashill, in the book Deconstructing Obama (2011), promoted the theory that Bill Ayers, co-founder of the militant radical left-wing organization Weather Underground, had authored President Barack Obama's autobiography Dreams from My Father. A review by Craig Fehrman in The Washington Post argued that "Cashill’s clues are far from convincing" on the supposed involvement of Ayers; Fehrman also described the book itself as being "grotesque, delusional and paranoid". Eric McHenry, writing for Salon accused Cashill of believing "Obama’s entire life is one massive fraud" and exclusively applying this notion to Obama's writings; Cashill had claimed at least one of Obama's few poems were really the work of Frank Marshall Davis. Media Matters for America noted "Cashill has a long history of pushing insane conspiracy theories about Obama."

TWA 800: The Crash, The Cover Up, The Conspiracy, a book written by Cashill, was published in July 2016 by Regnery. The Pitch described Cashill as a conspiracy theorist; he promotes the theory that TWA 800 was hit by a missile and doubted the veracity of Barack Obama's published birth certificate. First Strike (2003), Cashill's earlier book on the crash of TWA Flight 800, alleged the real cause had been covered up to stop Bill Clinton from losing the 1996 presidential election. He had claimed, in the 2004 documentary Mega Fix, that cover-ups by President Clinton concerning the Oklahoma City bombing in 1995 and the Atlanta Olympics bombing the following year, contributed to the September 11 attacks. He implied the 1995 and 1996 attacks were the actions of Islamic terrorists.

== Bibliography ==
| Book | Year | Notes |
|---|---|---|
| Snake Handling in Mid-America | 1991 | ISBN 0-93370-157-8 |
| 2006: The Chautauqua Rising | 2000 | ISBN 0-96723-571-5 |
| First Strike: TWA Flight 800 and the Attack on America | 2003 | ISBN 0-78526-354-3 |
| Ron Brown's Body: How One Man's Death Saved the Clinton Presidency and Hillary's Future | 2004 | ISBN 0-78526-237-7 |
| Sucker Punch: The Left Hook that Dazed Ali and Killed King's Dream | 2006 | ISBN 1-59555-033-X |
| What's the Matter with California: Cultural Rumbles from the Golden State and Why the Rest of Us Should Be Shaking | 2007 | ISBN 1-41653-103-3 |
| Hoodwinked: How Intellectual Hucksters Have Hijacked American Culture | 2009 | ISBN 1-59555-286-3 |
| Popes and Bankers: A Cultural History of Credit & Debt, From Aristotle to AIG | 2010 | ISBN 1-59555-273-1 |
| Deconstructing Obama: The Life, Loves, and Letters of America's First Postmodern President | 2011 | ISBN 1-45161-111-0 |
| If I Had A Son: Race, Guns, and the Railroading of George Zimmerman | 2013 | ISBN 1-93806-721-5 |
| You Lie: The Evasions, Omissions, Fabrications, Frauds, and Outright Falsehoods of Barack Obama | 2014 | ISBN 978-0062347503 |
| Scarlet Letters: The Ever-Increasing Intolerance of the Cult of Liberalism | 2015 | ISBN 978-1935071921 |
| TWA 800: The Crash, the Cover-Up, and the Conspiracy | 2016 | ISBN 978-1621574712 |
| Unmasking Obama: The Fight to Tell the True Story of a Failed Presidency | 2020 | ISBN 978-1642934458 |
| Untenable: The True Story of White Ethnic Flight from America's Cities | 2023 | ISBN 978-1637586464 |
| ASHLI: The Untold Story of the Women of January 6 | 2024 | ISBN 979-8888457757 |
