= Inter-American Magnet School =

- Escuela Inter-Americana
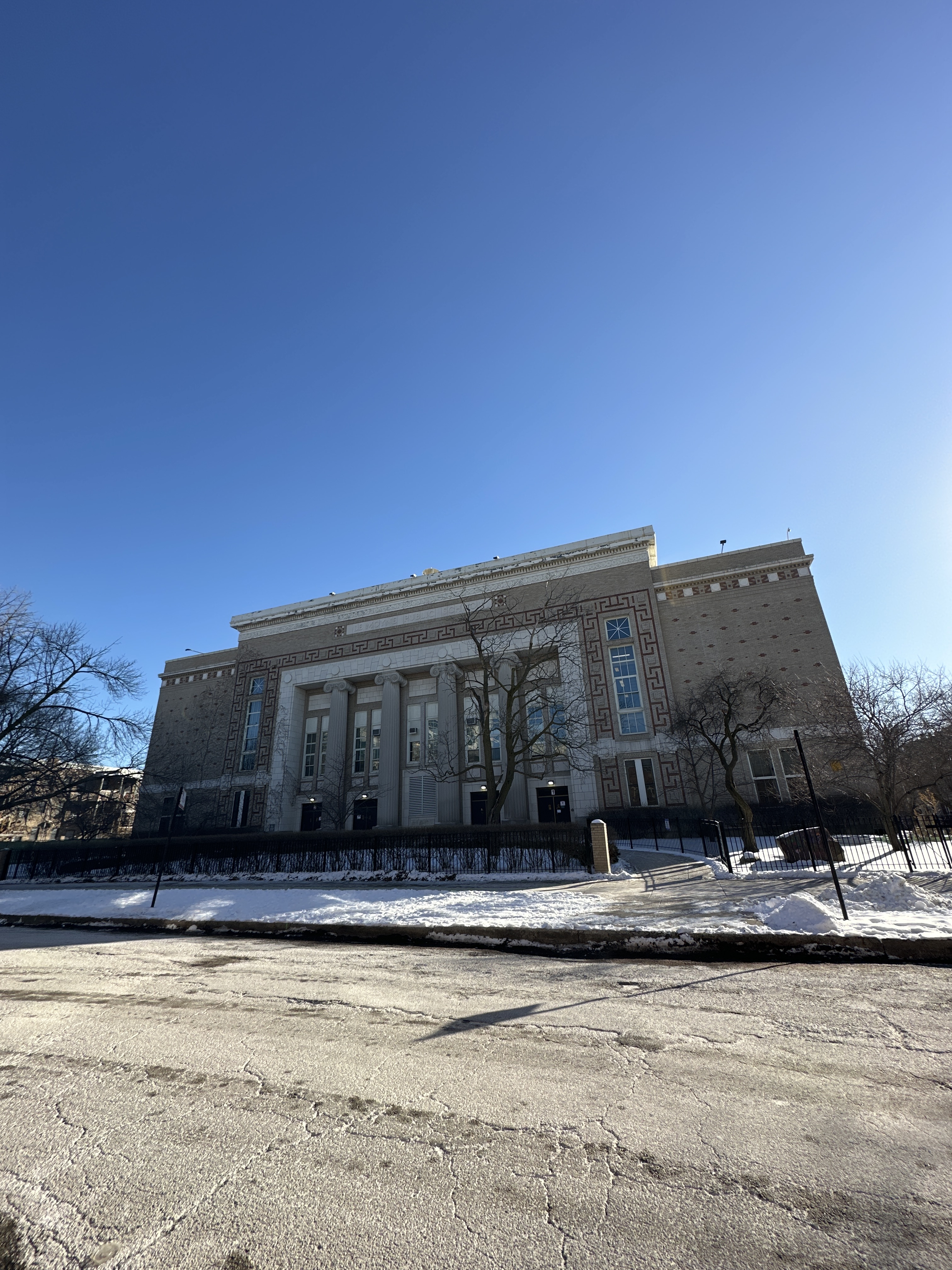

Location
- 851 West Waveland Ave. Chicago, Illinois 60613; United States; 41.949012°N 87.651408°W

Information
- School type: Public K-8
- Opened: 1975
- School district: Chicago Public Schools
- Grades: K-8
- Gender: Coed
- Campus type: Urban
- Website: iamschicago.com

Inter-American Magnet School (IAMS; Spanish: Escuela Inter-Americana) is a K-8 magnet school in Lake View, Chicago, Illinois. The oldest two-way bilingual school in the Midwestern United States, it is a part of Chicago Public Schools (CPS).

Children learn to speak, read and write fluently in Spanish and English. One of few public schools to be founded by parents, the school serves over 650 ethnically and economically diverse preschool through 8th grade students from all over Chicago. The school is affiliated with the International Spanish Academy of the Spanish Ministry of Education and Sciences and is located at 851 West Waveland Ave. Chicago, Illinois.

== History ==
Inter-American was started by parents who desired a multilingual school for their children. Adela Coronado-Greeley and Janet Nolan cofounded the school and became teachers there. It first opened with only preschool in 1975. The preschool opened in September 1975 in two rooms in the old Bartelme School in Rogers Park where Janet and Addy Tellez were the only teachers. A single bus provided transportation for the students. The school added new grade levels in subsequent years.

At the end of the year, the Board considered dropping the program, but the Parent Advisory Council (PAC), headed by Adela Coronado-Greeley, persuaded the Board members to expand the program instead, and a kindergarten was added for 1976. The next year, the Board extended the program to first grade and, subsequently, a grade was added each year. In 1978, IAMS moved into LeMoyne School, east of Wrigley Field.

Intense lobbying by IAMS parents paid off in 1983, when the school won its own site, in a temporary building in Lakeview. The new location was the home of Robert Morris Elementary School, which had been a Lakeview neighborhood school since the late nineteenth century. In 1983 the school moved into its dedicated campus. While some Morris teachers and students left the school, most remained when IAMS moved in. IAMS graduated its first class of eighth graders in 1985.

In 1985, Eva Helwing was named the first official school principal and served in that role until she retired in 2005. Helwing, born in 1938, was a Hungarian American who had experienced rule under Nazi Germany and began attending American schools at age 13. She was hired despite the fact that at that time she did not know Spanish because of her past experiences living in Nazi Germany as an ethnic minority and learning English as a second language in the U.S.; she knew English, German, and Hungarian. After being hired she learned Spanish and began conducting school business in that language. Helwing died on January 10, 2012, in Niles, Illinois.

In 2000, after much community input, an architecture competition was held and IAMS almost won a brand new building in the Avondale neighborhood. However, promised federal funding never materialized. Instead, six years later, the school moved back to the LeMoyne building, which underwent a $7 million renovation by the Board of Education. The school now provides dual-language, multicultural, literature-based education for over 650 students. The tradition of parental activism continues. Parents are deeply involved in every aspect of school life, from curriculum to transportation, to volunteering in the classrooms.

== Organization ==
Familias En La Escuela (FELE) is the evolution of the PAC. FELE is completely free; no dues are required. One of the annual highlights organized by FELE is the Fiesta Cultural, a family-friendly celebration of Latino music, dance, food, arts and culture. FELE is a 501(c)3 nonprofit organization; donations to FELE are accepted through Guidestar. Parents, community and staff can connect with each on the IAMScommunity yahoo group (membership is required to view calendar and messages).

The school's Local School Council (LSC) was inspired by and modeled after the level of collaboration between parents, teachers and administration at Inter-American School before the days of school reform in the 1980s. Meetings are generally held every first Wednesday at the school cafeteria at 6:00 pm between various parents, staff, and community members with the belief that the increased amount of voices will lead to increased education for students.

== Challenges ==
Long considered a national model of dual-language instruction, Inter-American School, its teachers and administrators have been recognized and profiled throughout the years. While today there is more awareness of the economic and cognitive benefits of bilingualism and biliteracy, sustainable dual-language programs are not the norm.

Recent changes in leadership and location have caused controversy, and have the potential to "profoundly affect the nature of the school." Parents, staff and community are "working very hard to ensure the future sustainability of the program in its present location."

The 5th grade students are integrating "Sustainable Life" content in the curriculum. The children are learning about ecology, permaculture, recycling, nutrition, and more. As part of this, the children will build an Aztec Chinampas rain gain. Many professionals and organizations are contributing resources and expertise, including the Partners of the Americas, Organic School Project, Healthy Schools Campaign, and Midwest Permaculture. This project is being documented by film students from Columbia College.

== Campus ==
In 2014 artificial turf athletic field, built for $750,000 and financed by CPS and funds from the alderman, opened. It replaced a sod and concrete athletic field, and its opening allowed the school to conduct physical education classes outside.

== Admissions ==
As of 2003 the school uses a computerized lottery system. Most students apply at the preschool level. Inter-American, as of that year, had 60 spaces in its preschool program each year, and, as of 2002, annually 600 children applied to take these spaces. As of 2007 for the school's 65 kindergarten slots there were, each year, 1,100 applicants.

Each year the school has two or three spaces for children of employees at Inter-American. The school automatically admits siblings of students who are admitted through the lottery. The school does not use test scores nor academic performance in the application process.

The school, as of that year, aimed to have 60% of its students be Hispanic or Latino in order to maintain language interaction and to comply with desegregation laws passed by the U.S. federal government; the lottery takes into account gender and ethnicity. As of 2007 the applicants are separated by category and by ethnic/racial designation, so black male, black female, white male, white female, Hispanic/Latino male, Hispanic/Latina female, etc. categories are created and a lottery is held for each. As of 2003 the school used a waiting list to maintain its ethnic balance.

== Student body ==
As of the 1999-2000 school year the school had 651 students; from 1990 to 2003 the enrollment ranged from 573 students to about 650 students. 53.6% received free or reduced lunch (an indicator of being from a low income family). Of the total number of students, 62.2% were Hispanic, 18.8% were White American (including European American), 15.5% were African-American, 1.7% were Asians and Pacific Islanders, and 0.5% were Native Americans. Barbara V. Kirk Sesenac wrote in the Bilingual Research Journal that the school's income and racial demographics were "relatively stable." As of 1999-2000 26.1% were classified as limited English proficient (LEP). The numbers of LEP students varied between 1990-2003, with the usual percentages being 34-36%; the school in 1990 had 48.7% of its students as LEP, but this declined to 30.2% in 1991; these respectively were the high and low percentages of LEP during that period.

== Faculty and staff ==
The school had 39 bilingual teachers in the 1999-2000 school year. Among the bilingual staff were a principal, two assistant principals, and a counselor. 64% of the bilingual staff members were Hispanic and Latino; their origins included Mexican, Cuban, Peruvian, and Puerto Rican backgrounds.
