= Kohl Children's Museum =

- Established: 1985
- Location: Glenview, Illinois, United States
- Coordinates: 42.0936°N 87.8260°W
- Type: Children's museum
- Director: Michael Delfini
- Website: Kohl Children's Museum

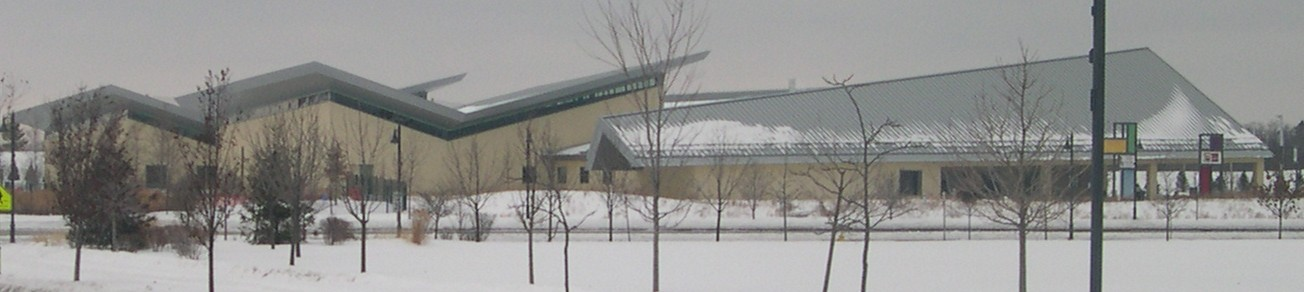
Kohl museum, view from east

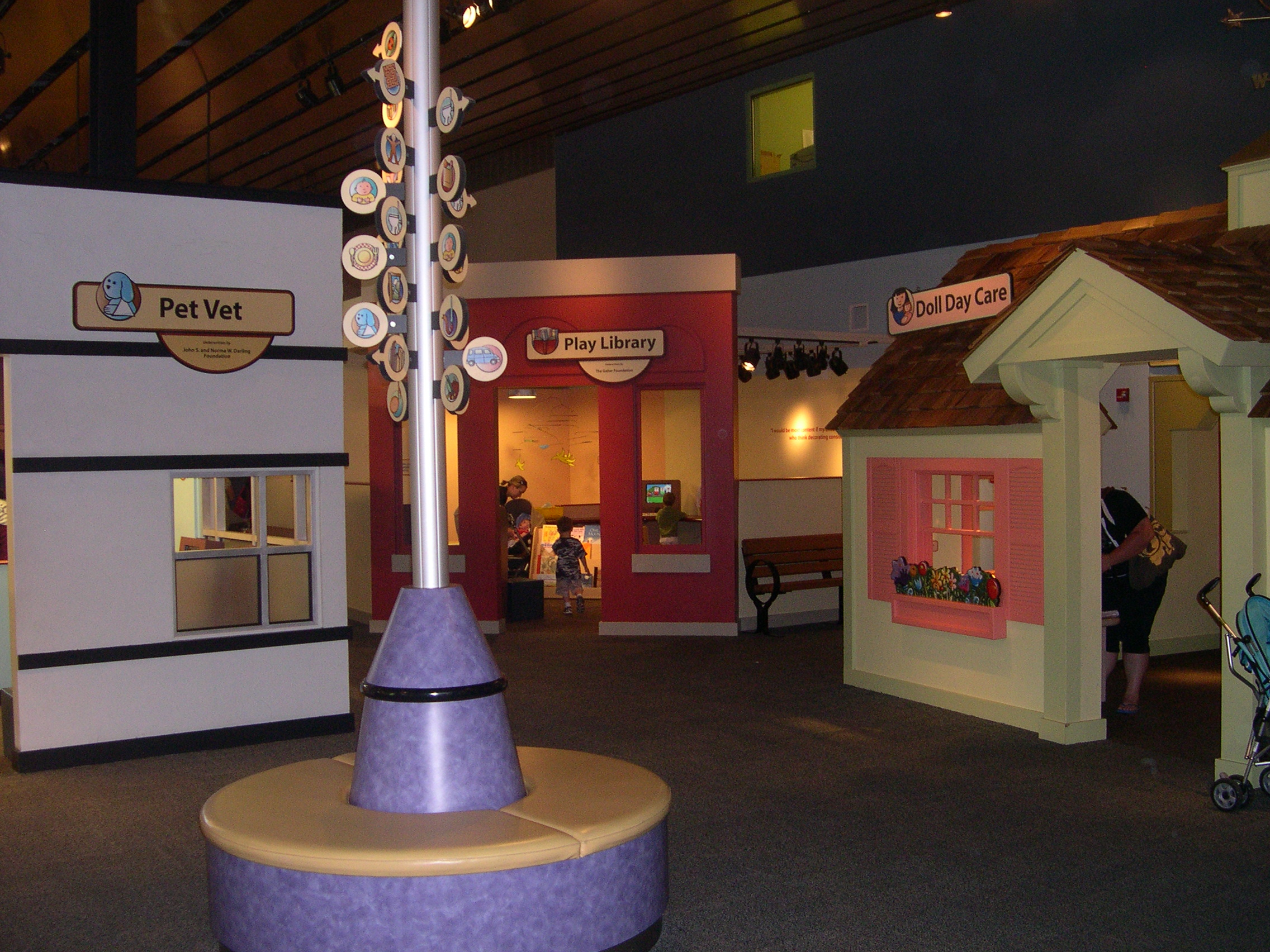
A corridor at Kohl museum

Kohl Children’s Museum of Greater Chicago is a children's museum in Glenview, Illinois that provides a hands-on learning laboratory for children ages birth to 8. It is named for philanthropist Dolores Kohl, daughter of the founder of Kohl’s department stores, who founded the museum through her education foundation in 1985. Located on an 8.8-acre (36,000 m^{2}) site, including a 46,700-square-foot (4,340 m^{2}) museum building and a 2-acre (0.81 ha) outdoor exhibit space, the museum features exhibits and programs aligned to the Illinois State Learning Standards and designed to make learning fun and interesting for young children.

== History ==
In 1985, the museum was opened as an extension of the Kohl Teaching Center. It was located in Wilmette, Illinois along Green Bay Road (Illinois Route 131). In 2005, the museum moved to a new location in Glenview, Illinois, in "The Glen", the redevelopment of the former Naval Air Station Glenview site. The new building is roughly twice the size of the original one.

== Accessibility ==
The museum is equally available to guests with any level of physical, visual, auditory, or cognitive challenge. All public areas are 100% ADA-compliant. The facility and all exhibits have been designed using the principles of universal design, which go beyond accessibility with an approach that uses multi-sensory experiences as educational tools. These experiences allow all guests with any level of physical, visual, auditory, and cognitive ability to experience the Museum and its offerings.

== Green building ==
Signage and activities provide children and families with hands-on learning opportunities about environmental concerns in both the indoor and outdoor exhibit spaces, accessible year-round.
