= Woods Fund of Chicago =

The Woods Fund of Chicago is a private independent foundation in Chicago, whose goal is to increase opportunities for less-advantaged people and communities in the Chicago metropolitan area, including the opportunity to shape decisions affecting them.

The Woods Charitable Fund was incorporated in Nebraska in 1941 by Frank Henry Woods Sr. (1868–1952) and Nelle Cochrane Woods (1870–1950) of Lincoln, Nebraska and their three sons: Thomas Cochrane Woods Sr. (1895–1958) of Lincoln, and Henry Cochrane Woods Sr. (1895–1968) and Frank Henry Woods Jr. (1905–1980) of Chicago, and operated in both Lincoln and Chicago for 53 years through 1993, when the Woods Charitable Fund was reorganized into two separate foundations, with separate officers, boards of directors, and staff.

The Woods Fund of Chicago was incorporated in Illinois on November 15, 1993, and effective January 1, 1994 was allocated 70% of the market value of the assets of the Woods Charitable Fund and began operation and continued the Fund's philanthropy in Chicago, while the Woods Charitable Fund continued its philanthropy in Lincoln.

The principal for the foundation came from business interests in the Lincoln Telephone & Telegraph Co. of Lincoln, Nebraska, the Sahara Coal Co. headquartered in Chicago with mines in Saline County in far Southern Illinois, and Addressograph-Multigraph Corp. of Cleveland, Ohio.

In 2004, the Woods Fund of Chicago was the 43rd largest foundation in Illinois by total assets with assets of $67,304,215.

== Mission statement ==
The fund describes itself as "a grantmaking foundation whose goal is to increase opportunities for less advantaged people and communities in the metropolitan area, including the opportunity to shape decisions affecting them. The foundation works primarily as a funding partner with nonprofit organizations. Woods supports nonprofits in their important roles of engaging people in civic life, addressing the causes of poverty and other challenges facing the region, promoting more effective public policies, reducing racism and other barriers to equal opportunity, and building a sense of community and common ground."

== Finances ==
In its 2006 annual report, the fund said it had made $3.1 million in grants to more than 70 local organizations. At the time, the fund had $58 million in assets.

== Presidents and Directors ==
=== Woods Charitable Fund ===
- President:
  - Frank Henry Woods Sr. (1941–1952)
  - Thomas Cochrane Woods Jr. (1952–1958)
  - Henry Cochrane Woods Sr. (1958–1968)
  - Thomas Cochrane Woods Jr. (1968–1989)
  - Lucia Woods Lindley (1990–1993)
  - Thomas Cochrane Woods, III (1993–2000)
  - Thomas D. Potter (2001–2002)
  - Stephen S. Sands (2003–2004)
  - Michael J. Tavlin (2005–2006)
  - Donna Wiemann Woods (2007– )
- Executive Director: Jean Rudd (1980–1993), Pam Baker (1994– )
- Board of Directors, 1993:
  - Lucia Woods Lindley - (Director 1980–1993) - President (1990–1993), Woods Charitable Fund; co-founder, Chicago Foundation for Women; founder, The Sophia Fund; photographer; daughter of Frank Henry Woods Jr.
  - George Kelm - (Director 1968–1996) - Chairman (1992–1994), former President & CEO (1978–1992), Sahara Enterprises, Inc.; former Associate (1954–1963), Partner (1964–1972), Managing Partner (1973–1978), Hopkins & Sutter; former Vice President, Woods Charitable Fund (1978–1993)
  - Mary Decker - (Director 1991–1994) - Director (1991–1994), Cook County Office of Capital Planning and Policy; Senior Vice President for community relations and reinvestment activities, First Chicago Bank (1994–1995), First Chicago NBD (1995–1998), Banc One (1998– ); former Executive Director (1985–1990), Metropolitan Planning Council; winner (1989), Crain's Chicago Business "40 Under 40" award; former Executive Director (1978–1985), Friends of the Parks
  - Charles N. Wheatley - (Director 1993– ) - President & CEO (1992– ), former Vice President & Secretary (1985–1992) Sahara Enterprises, Inc.; Vice President (1994–1996), Woods Fund of Chicago
  - Thomas Cochrane Woods III - (Director 1980–2000) - Chairman (1993–1999), Lincoln Telecommunications; President (1993–2000), former Vice President (1989–1993), Woods Charitable Fund; son of Thomas Cochrane Woods Jr.
  - Sydney D. Beane - (Director 1990-1995) - Western Regional Director (1993– ), Center for Community Change; former Executive Director (1983–1993), Lincoln Indian Center (1983–1993); former Assistant Professor and Director of American Indian Projects (1980–1983), School of Social Work, Arizona State University
  - Marie Fischer - (Director 1991-1996) - Trainer, The Grantsmanship Center; Professor Emeritus, Department of Community and Regional Planning, College of Architecture, University of Nebraska–Lincoln

=== Woods Fund of Chicago ===
- President:
  - George Kelm (1994–1996)
  - Jean Rudd (1997–2000)
  - Ricardo A. Millett (2001–2005)
  - Deborah Harrington (2006–2009)
  - Laura S. Washington (2010- )
- Executive Director: Jean Rudd (1980–1996)
- Board of Directors, 1994:
  - George Kelm - (Director 1968–1996)
  - Mary Decker - (Director 1991–1994)
  - Charles N. Wheatley - (Director 1993– )
  - Barack Obama - (Director 1994–2002) - Associate (1993–1996), Of counsel (1997–2004), Davis, Miner, Barnhill & Galland; Lecturer (1992–1996), Senior Lecturer (1996–2004), University of Chicago Law School; Illinois State Senator (1997–2004); winner (1993), Crain's Chicago Business "40 Under 40" award; former president (1990–1991), Harvard Law Review; former Executive Director (1985–1988), Developing Communities Project
  - Howard J. Stanback - (Director 1994–2005) - Executive Vice President (1989–1992, 1994–1997), Airport Resources Partners (ARP) Inc.; Manager (1998–2002), New Kenwood, LLC; President & CEO (2002–2005), Leadership Council for Metropolitan Open Communities; former City Manager (1992–1993), Hartford, Connecticut; former Commissioner (1988–1989), Chicago Department of Aviation; former Administrative Assistant (1987–1988) to Chicago Mayors Washington and Sawyer; former Deputy Director for Strategic Planning (1985–1987), Chicago Office of Employment and Training; former Assistant Professor of Economics (1981–1985), New School for Social Research
- Other Directors, 1995–2005:
  - Maria G. Valdez - (Director 1995–2005) - Senior Litigator (1992–2003), Regional Counsel (2003–2005), Mexican American Legal Defense and Education Fund; winner (2001), Crain's Chicago Business "40 Under 40" award; Magistrate Judge (2005– ), U.S. District Court for the Northern District of Illinois
  - Cynthia M. Campbell - (Director 1997–2002) - President (1995– ), McCormick Theological Seminary
  - R. Eden Martin - (Director 1997–2005) - Partner (1975–2004), Chairman of the Management Committee (1989–1999), Of counsel (2005– ), Sidley & Austin; President (1999– ), Civic Committee and the Commercial Club of Chicago
- Board of Directors, 2008:
  - Charles N. Wheatley - (Director 1993– )
  - William C. Ayers - (Director 1999– ) - Distinguished Professor of Education, University of Illinois at Chicago
  - Laura S. Washington - (Director 2003– ) - Ida B. Wells-Barnett University Professor and Fellow of the DePaul Humanities Center
  - Jesus G. Garcia - (Director 2003– ) - Executive Director, Little Village Community Development Corporation
  - Doris Salomón Chagin - (Director 2005– ) - Community Affairs Director, Midwest US, BP America Inc.
  - Lee Bey - (Director 2006– ) - Executive Director (2007– ), Chicago Central Area Committee; former Director of Media and Governmental Affairs (2004–2006), Skidmore, Owings, & Merrill LLP
  - Beth E. Richie - (Director 2006– ) - Professor and Head of the Department of African American Studies, University of Illinois at Chicago
  - Patrick M. Sheahan - (Director 2008– ) - Executive Director, Public Affairs, UBS Investment Bank
- Board Chair:
  - Charles N. Wheatley (1997)
  - Barack Obama (1998)
  - Howard J. Stanback (1999–2002)
  - Maria G. Valdez (2003–2004)
  - William C. Ayers (2005–2006)
  - Laura S. Washington (2007–2009)
  - Jesus G. Garcia (2010- )
- Board Vice Chair:
  - Barack Obama (1997)
  - Howard J. Stanback (1998)
  - Maria G. Valdez (1999–2002)
  - William C. Ayers (2003–2004)
  - Laura S. Washington (2005–2006)
  - Jesus G. Garcia (2007–2009)
  - Doris Solomon (2010- )
