= Bilingual Research Journal =

US academic journal

- Discipline: Linguistics, education
- Language: English, Spanish
- Edited by: Dr Ester de Jong, Dr Cristina Gillanders

Publication details
- Former name: The Journal of the National Association for Bilingual Education
- History: 1975–present
- Publisher: Taylor and Francis for the National Association for Bilingual Education
- Frequency: Triannually

Standard abbreviations
- ISO 4: Biling. Res. J.

Indexing
- ISSN: 1523-5882 (print); 1523-5890 (web)
- LCCN: 99003287
- OCLC no.: 472859760

Links
- Journal homepage

The Bilingual Research Journal is a triannual peer-reviewed academic journal covering bilingual and multilingual education theory and practice and language policies in education. It is the only journal specifically dedicated to bilingual/multilingual education.

The journal was established in 1975 by the US National Association for Bilingual Education as The Journal of the National Association for Bilingual Education (or NABE Journal). The first edition was May 1976, under editor Alma Flor Ada. It continued to publish three editions a year, under a series of different editors, until spring 1989, when there was a break in publication. The journal was then renamed to Bilingual Research Journal, its first edition as such being the Winter/Spring 1992 edition, under editor Andrea B. Bermúdez.

As of 2025, the journal is published by Taylor and Francis. The editors, since 2023, are Dr Ester de Jong and Dr Cristina Gillanders, both of the University of Colorado, Denver.

== See also ==
- National Association for Bilingual Education
