= Barack and Michelle =

2009 unauthorized biography by Christopher Andersen

- Author: Christopher Andersen
- Language: English
- Genre: Biography
- Publisher: HarperCollins Publishers
- Publication date: September 2009
- Publication place: United States
- Media type: Print (hardcover)
- Pages: 326
- ISBN: 978-0-06-177196-5

Barack and Michelle: Portrait of An American Marriage is an unauthorized "tell-all" biography about Barack and Michelle Obama, focusing on their marriage, written by No. 1 New York Times best-selling author Christopher Andersen and published in 2009.

== Background ==
Andersen previously wrote 28 popular biographies about Princess Diana, Barbra Streisand, the Kennedys, and the Bush family, among others. Barack and Michelle describes the Obamas' marriage as being difficult for several years, as Barack left his accomplished wife, Michelle, to care for children and household, himself turning away from a lucrative legal career to pursue his political ambitions with little success or income. The couple grew closer, according to the book, beginning in 2001 after the sickness of their daughter, Sasha, and Obama's growing political success. The book draws in part on previously published accounts and Obama's own memoirs. It has been described as a "glowing" portrait of the Obamas, and characterizing their marriage as "solid". Andersen interviewed 200 friends and relatives of the Obamas in Chicago, Hawaii, and Indonesia, many of whom are identified in the book's chapter and source notes, but not the Obamas themselves.
