= Hopkins & Sutter =

Defunct American law firm

- Founded: 1921; 105 years ago
- Founder: Albert Hopkins; Harry Sutter
- Defunct: 2000
- Headquarters: Chicago
- Website: www.hopsut.com

Hopkins & Sutter was a Chicago-based law firm that practiced from 1921 to 2000, before it merged with Milwaukee-based Foley & Lardner.

== History ==
The firm was established by Albert Hopkins and Harry Sutter. Hopkins had worked for two years at the Interstate Commerce Commission and for one year with the predecessor to the Internal Revenue Service, while Sutter was tax counsel to the Guaranty Trust Company of New York.

In 1923, the firm opened an office in Washington, D.C. Hopkins also operated an office in Detroit, Michigan. The firm was known for its expertise in tax, insurance.public policy and transportation finance work.

== Merger ==
Hopkins & Sutter acquired the lobbying and public policy law firm of Leonard, Ralston, Sutter & Remington in 1997. The firm merged with Foley & Lardner in 2000 and all of its 130 attorneys joined that national firm, though many partners have since departed in the years following the merger.

== Notable attorneys ==
- Samuel K. Skinner, former U.S. Secretary of Transportation and White House Chief of Staff
- Barack Obama, summer associate in the 1990 class
- Jerris Leonard, former Wisconsin politician and lobbyist
