= Developing Communities Project =

Faith-based organization

- Type: Faith-based organization
- Headquarters: Chicago, Illinois
- Location: United States

The Developing Communities Project (DCP) is a faith-based organization in Chicago, Illinois. DCP was organized in 1984 as a branch of the Calumet Community Religious Conference (CCRC) in response to lay-offs and plant closings in Southeast Chicago in the 1970s and 1980s. In 1986, DCP was incorporated as a not-for-profit organization under the leadership of its first executive director Barack Obama. It continues to provide literacy, job training and leadership development programs, for which it has received multiple awards, such as the 2007 Chicago Community Organizing Award.

Its mission "is to help community residents to use community organizing to effectively improve the quality of life in Chicago's Greater Roseland Community Areas."

One of its current projects is to work with Loyola University's Center for Urban Research & Learning (CURL) and the Chicago Metropolitan Agency for Planning (CMAP) on the CTA Red Line Extension.
