= List of Weatherman actions =

List of Weatherman militant activities

The Weatherman, also known as the Weathermen or later the Weather Underground Organization, was an American far-left militant organization that carried out a series of militant activities from 1969 through the 1970s which included bombings, jailbreaks, and riots.

Following is a list of the organization's various activities and incidents.

== Activities ==
=== 1969 ===
- June 18–22 – Students for a Democratic Society SDS National Convention held in Chicago, Illinois. Publication of "Weatherman" founding statement. Members seize control of SDS National Office.
- Summer - A group of members invade the Harvard Center for International Affairs, beating staff and destroying property
- July – Members Bernardine Dohrn, Eleanor Raskin, Dianne Donghi, Peter Clapp, David Millstone and Diana Oughton travel to Cuba and meet representatives of the North Vietnamese and Cuban governments.
- August – Weatherman member Linda Sue Evans travels to North Vietnam. Weatherman activists meet in Cleveland, Ohio, in preparation for "Days of Rage" protests scheduled for October, 1969 in Chicago.
- September 3 – Female members participate in a "jailbreak" at South Hills High School in Pittsburgh, Pennsylvania, where they run through the school shouting anti-war slogans and distributing literature promoting the "National Action." The term "Pittsburgh 26" refers to the 26 women arrested in connection with this incident.
- September 24 – A group of members confronted Chicago Police during a demonstration supporting the "National Action" and protesting the commencement of the Chicago Eight trial stemming from the 1968 Democratic National Convention.
- October 6 – The Haymarket Police Statue in Chicago was bombed; Weathermen later claimed credit for the bombing in their book, Prairie Fire.
- October 8–11 – The "Days of Rage" riots occurred in Chicago, damaging a large amount of property. 287 Weatherman members were arrested; some became fugitives when they failed to appear for trial.
- November 8 - Sniper attack on Cambridge Police Station. Two shots were fired. Two Weathermen, James Kilpatrick and James Reaves, were indicted and subsequently released when a witness recanted his testimony.
- November–December – Karen Ashley and Phoebe Hirsch were among the few Weatherman members to join the first contingent of the Venceremos Brigade (VB) that departs for Cuba to harvest sugar cane.
- December 6 – Bombing of several Chicago police cars parked in a precinct parking lot at 3600 North Halsted Street, Chicago. The WUO claims responsibility in Prairie Fire, stating it was a protest of the fatal police shooting of Illinois Black Panther Party leaders Fred Hampton and Mark Clark on December 4, 1969.
- December 27–30 – Weathermen held a "War Council" in Flint, Michigan, where plans were finalized to change into an underground organization that would commit strategic acts of sabotage against the government. Thereafter they were called "Weather Underground Organization" (WUO).

=== 1970 ===
- January - Silas and Judith Bissell placed a homemade bomb under the steps of the ROTC building. The bomb was made from an electric blasting cap, an alarm clock, a battery and a plastic bag filled with gasoline and explosives.
- February – The WUO closed the SDS National Office in Chicago, concluding the major campus-based organization of the 1960s. The first contingent of the VB returned from Cuba and the second contingent departed. By mid-February the bulk of the leading WUO members had gone underground.
- February 16 – A bomb planted at the Park Police Station detonated at 10:45 p.m., apparently intended to align with a shift change, and killed a police sergeant, Brian McDonnell. Several investigators and one informant attest this was a Weatherman action overseen by Dohrn, but others doubt the group's involvement, and all Weather associates deny it. The case remains unsolved, but if perpetrated by Weather, then McDonnell would be the first known fatality from a Weatherman action.
- February 21 – The house of Judge Murtagh, who was presiding over the Panther 21 trial, is fire-bombed with three Molotov cocktails by a WUO cell in New York City.
- March – Warrants are issued for several WUO members, who become federal fugitives when they fail to appear for trial in Chicago.
- March 6 – WUO members Theodore Gold, Diana Oughton, and Terry Robbins are killed in the Greenwich Village townhouse explosion, when a nailbomb they were constructing detonates. The bomb was intended to be planted at a non-commissioned officer's dance at Fort Dix, New Jersey.
- March 30 – Chicago police discover a WUO "bomb factory" on Chicago's north side.
- April 1 - Based on a tip Chicago Police find 59 sticks of dynamite, ammunition, and nitroglycerin in an apartment traced to WUO members. The discovery of the WUO weapons cache ends WUO activity in this city.
- April 2 - A federal grand jury in Chicago returns a number of indictments charging WUO members with violation of federal anti-riot laws. Also, a number of additional federal warrants charging "unlawful flight to avoid prosecution" are returned in Chicago based on the failure of WUO members to appear for trial in local cases. (The Anti-riot Law charges were later dropped in January, 1974.)
- April 15 – The FBI arrests WUO members Linda Sue Evans and Dianne Donghi in New York City with the help of WUO infiltrator, Larry Grathwohl.
- May 10 – The National Guard Association of the United States building in Washington, D.C. is bombed.
- May 21 – The WUO releases its "Declaration of a State of War" communique under Bernardine Dohrn's name.
- June 6 – In a letter, the WUO claims credit for bombing of the San Francisco Hall of Justice, although no explosion has occurred. Months later, workmen locate an unexploded bomb.
- June 9 - The New York City Police headquarters is bombed by Jane Alpert and accomplices. Weathermen state this is in response to "police repression." The bomb made with ten sticks of dynamite exploded in the NYC Police Headquarters. The explosion was preceded by a warning about six minutes prior to the detonation and subsequently by a WUO claim of responsibility.
- July 23 – A federal grand jury in Detroit, Michigan, returns indictments against thirteen WUO members and former WUO members charging violations of various explosives and firearms laws. (These indictments were later dropped in October, 1973.)
- July 25 - The United States Army base at The Presidio in San Francisco is bombed on the 11th anniversary of the Cuban Revolution. [NYT, 7/27/70] On the same day, a branch of the Bank of America is bombed in New York.
- July 28 - Bank of America HQ in NYC is bombed around 3:50 AM. WUO claims responsibility.
- September 15 – The WUO helps Dr. Timothy Leary escape from the California Men's Colony prison.
- October 6 - Second bombing of Chicago's Haymarket Police monument
- October 8 - Bombing of Marin County courthouse. WUO states this is in retaliation for the killings of Jonathan Jackson, William Christmas, and James McClain (Note: On August 7, 1970, Jackson and San Quentin inmates Christmas and McClain were killed outside the Marin County Courthouse in an attempted jailbreak. According to some accounts, their goal was to use the hostages to take over a radio station and broadcast about the racist, murderous conditions at the prison. The incident is also referred to by some as Black August. [NYT, 8/10/70] WUO also dedicates the bombing to political activist, Angela Davis. In a separate communique, they issue a message to peace activist, Daniel Berrigan after he is captured by the FBI.)
- October 10 - A Queens traffic-court building is bombed. WUO claims this is to express support for the New York prison riots. [NYT, 10/10/70, p. 12]
- October 11 - A Courthouse in Long Island City, NY is bombed. An estimated 8 to 10 sticks of dynamite are used. A warning was given around 10 min. prior to the 1:23 AM blast by the WUO.
- October 14 - The Harvard Center for International Affairs is bombed by The Proud Eagle Tribe of Weather (later renamed the Women's Brigade of the Weather Underground). WUO claims this is to protest the war in Vietnam. [NYT, 10/14/70, p. 30] The bombing was in reaction to Angela Davis' arrest and was the first action undertaken by an all-women's unit of WUO.
- October - Bernardine Dohrn, Katherine Ann Power, and Susan Edith Saxe were put on the FBI's Ten Most Wanted List
- December – Fugitive WUO member Caroline Tanker, who fled the country for Cuba, is arrested by the FBI in Pittsburgh, Pennsylvania.
- December 5 - Five Weatherman are captured for trying to bomb First National City Bank of NY and other buildings on the anniversary of the death of Fred Hampton. These individuals subsequently plead guilty.
- December 11 - Vivian Bogart and Patricia Mclean from the WUO are arrested after throwing an incendiary bomb at the Royal National Bank in NYC around 1:30 AM.
- December 16 - Fugitive WUO member Judith Alice Clark is arrested on the Days of Rage indictments by the FBI in New York.

=== 1971 ===
- March 1 - The United States Capitol is bombed. WUO states this is to protest the invasion of Laos. President Richard M. Nixon denounces the bombing as a "shocking act of violence that will outrage all Americans." [NYT, 3/2/71]
- April – FBI agents discover what is dubbed "Pine Street Bomb Factory", an abandoned apartment utilized by WUO in San Francisco, California.
- August 30 - Bombings of the Office of California Prisons in Sacramento and San Francisco, allegedly in retaliation for the killing of George Jackson. [LAT, 8/29/71]
- September 17 - The New York Department of Corrections in Albany, New York is bombed, as per WUO to protest the killing of 29 inmates at Attica State Penitentiary. [NYT, 9/18/71]
- October 15 - The bombing of William Bundy's office in the MIT research center. [NYT, 10/16/71]
- Dec 2 - Fugitive WUO member Matthew Steen, suspected in the US Capitol bombing, is arrested in Seattle by the FBI for bank robbery but convicted of federal conspiracy and sentenced to ten years.

=== 1972 ===
- May 19 - Bombing of The Pentagon, "in retaliation for the U.S. bombing raid in Hanoi." The date was chosen for it being Ho Chi Minh's birthday. [NYT, 5/19/72]

=== 1973 ===
- May 18 - The bombing of the 103rd Police Precinct in New York. WUO states this is in response to the killing of 10-year-old black youth Clifford Glover by police. (Note: Audre Lorde wrote a poem entitled, "Power" which was inspired by Clifford Glover. Read the poem here., 1983)
- September 19 – A WUO member is arrested by the FBI in New York. Released on bond, this member again submerges into the underground.
- September 28 - ITT headquarters buildings in New York City and Rome, Italy are bombed. WUO states this is in response to ITT's alleged role in the Chilean coup earlier that month.
- Around October, 1973 the Government requested dropping charges against most of the WUO members. The requests cited a recent decision by the Supreme Court that barred electronic surveillance without a court order. This decision could hamper prosecution of the WUO cases. In addition, the government did not want to reveal foreign intelligence secrets that the court has ordered disclosed.

=== 1974 ===
- March 6 - Bombing of the U.S. Department of Health, Education, and Welfare offices in San Francisco. WUO states this is to protest alleged sterilization of poor women. In the accompanying communiqué, the Women's Brigade argues for "the need for women to take control of daycare, healthcare, birth control and other aspects of women's daily lives."
- May 31 - The Office of the California Attorney General is bombed. WUO states this is in response to the killing of six members of the Symbionese Liberation Army.
- June 17 - Gulf Oil's Pittsburgh headquarters is bombed. WUO states this is to protest the company's actions in Angola, Vietnam, and elsewhere.
- July – The WUO releases the book Prairie Fire, in which they indicate the need for a unified Communist Party. They encourage the creation of study groups to discuss their ideology, and continue to stress the need for violent acts. The book also admits WUO responsibility of several actions from previous years. The Prairie Fire Organizing Committee (PFOC) arises from the teachings in this book and is organized by many former WUO members.
- September 11 – Bombing of Anaconda Corporation (part of the Rockefeller Corporation). WUO states this is in retribution for Anaconda's alleged involvement in the Chilean coup the previous year.

=== 1975 ===
- January 29 - Bombing of the State Department; WUO states this is in response to escalation in Vietnam. (AP. "State Department Rattled by Blast," The Daily Times-News, January 29, 1975, p. 1)
- January 23 - Offices of Dept. of Defense in Oakland are bombed. In a statement released to the press, Weather expressed solidarity with the Vietnamese still fighting against the Thieu regime in Vietnam.
- Spring - WUO publishes "Politics in Command," which is its new political-military strategy. It furthers the line of building a legal, above-ground organization and begins to minimize the armed struggle role.
- March – The WUO releases its first edition of a new magazine entitled Osawatomie.
- June 16 - Weathermen bomb a Banco de Ponce (a Puerto Rican bank) in New York, WUO states this is in solidarity with striking Puerto Rican cement workers.
- July - More than a thousand women attend the Socialist Feminist Conference at Antioch College in Yellow Springs, OH in which WUO supporters attempt to play a major role.
- July 11–13 – The Prairie Fire Organizing Committee (PFOC) holds its first national convention during which time they go through the formality of creating a new organization.
- Just after midnight on September 5 – Bombing of the Kennecott Corporation, Salt Lake City, UT on the second anniversary of the fascist coup in Chile. WUO states this is in retribution for Kennecott's alleged involvement in the coup and its exploitation of working people in the US. The blast kills no one but causes an estimated $40,000 to $50,000 of damages.

=== 1976 ===
- 1976-1981 the Weather Underground slowly disbands, many members turning themselves in after taking advantage of the Federal Government dropping most charges in 1973 (illegal wiretaps and intelligence sources & methods issues) and of President Jimmy Carter's amnesty for draft dodgers.

=== 1977 ===
- February - The first issue of Prairie Fire Organizing Committee's magazine, Breakthrough, is published.
- Spring - The John Brown Book Club compiles articles critical of the old WUO leadership and subsequent split in a pamphlet entitled: The Split of the Weather Underground Organization: Struggling against White and Male Supremacy.
- November 1977 - Former WUO member Matthew Landy Steen appears on the lead segment of CBS 60 Minutes, the first and last ex-Weatherman to appear on national television, urging WUO members still underground to "re-emerge and engage change at the community level." Mark Rudd surrendered within 60 days; the remainder of the Weather leadership resurfaced the following year.
- November - Five WUO members are arrested on conspiracy to bomb California State Senator, John Brigg's offices. It is later revealed that the Revolutionary Committee and PFOC had been infiltrated, and the arrests were the results of the infiltration. From this point on, some authors argue that the Weather Underground Organization ceases to exist.

=== 1980 ===
- July - Former WUO member, Cathy Wilkerson surfaces in New York City and is charged with possession of explosives arising from the 1970 townhouse explosion. She is sentenced to 3 years in prison.
- December 3 - Bernadine Dohrn and Bill Ayers turn themselves in. Charges against Ayers are dropped in 1973 (illegal wire taps & foreign intelligence sources and methods). Dohrn is placed on probation. It was discovered that the FBI had discussed a plan to kidnap her nephew, amongst other controversial schemes.

=== 1981 ===
- October 20 - Brinks robbery in which WUO members Kathy Boudin, Sam Brown, Judy Clark and David Gilbert and the Black Liberation Army stole over $1.6 million from a Brinks armored car at the Nanuet Mall, near Nyack, New York on October 20, 1981. The robbers were stopped by police later that day and engaged them in a shootout, killing two police officers (Waverly Brown and Edward O’Grady) and one Brinks guard (Peter Paige) as well as wounding several others.

=== 1987 ===
- Silas Bissell a leader of the Weather Underground Organization, who was once on the FBI's Ten Most Wanted list is arrested for attempting to bomb a ROTC building. His ex-wife, Judith Bissell served three years for the attempted bombing of California State Senator John Briggs.

== See also ==
- Greenwich Village townhouse explosion
- Weather Underground Organization
- May 19th Communist Organization
- The Weather Underground, documentary film
- Underground, documentary film

General:

- Domestic terrorism in the United States
- List of incidents of political violence in Washington, D.C.
