= List of Weatherman members =

The Weather Underground Organization (WUO), whose members were often called Weatherman, was a radical leftist organization founded in 1969 and active through 1980. The following is a list of some of the members of Weatherman.

== Members ==
- Jane Alpert
- Karen Ashley
- Bill Ayers
- Rick Ayers
- Kit Bakke
- Silas Bissell †
- Kathy Boudin †
- Scott Braley
- Judith Clark
- Bernardine Dohrn
- Jennifer Dohrn, sister of Bernardine and supporter
- Dianne Donghi
- Linda Sue Evans
- Brian Flanagan
- Ronald David Fliegelman
- David Gilbert
- Ted Gold †
- Larry Grathwohl †
- Susan Hagedorn
- Phoebe Hirsch
- John Jacobs †
- Naomi Jaffe
- Jeff Jones
- Michael Justesen
- Nancy Kurshan
- Clayton Van Lydegraf †
- Howard Machtinger
- Eric Mann
- Charlotte Massey
- Douglas Murdock
- Mark D. Naison
- Diana Oughton †
- Marc Curtis Perry
- Eleanor Raskin, nee Stein
- Jonah Raskin
- James H. Reeves
- Terry Robbins †
- Susan Rosenberg
- Robert Roth
- Mark Rudd
- Nancy Ann Rudd
- Kenneth "Kenny" Schlosser
- Michael "Mike" Spiegel
- Matthew Steen
- Susan Stern †
- Laura Whitehorn
- Cathy Wilkerson

† Deceased.

The above list includes some people who were connected with Weatherman (the above-ground political grouping that preceded the Weather Underground Organization) but did not go underground to join the WUO.

=== Matthew Steen ===
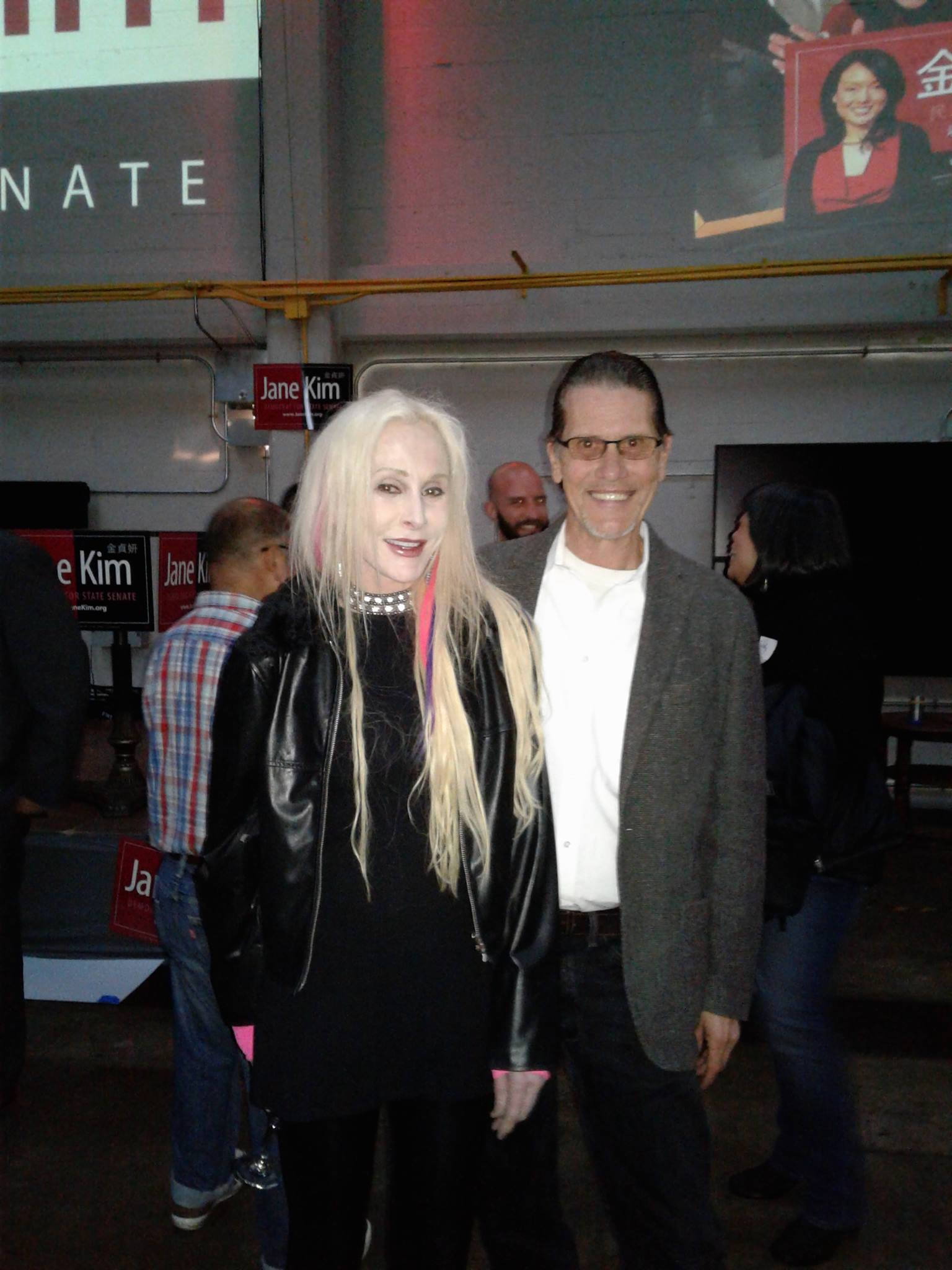
Matthew Steen and Karen Jessica Evans attending a Democratic Party Fundraiser in San Francisco, 2016

Matthew Landy Steen (born August 22, 1949), also known under the alias William Hollis Coquillette, is a former member of Weather Underground and Students for a Democratic Society. In 1972, he was indicted on federal conspiracy and bank robbery charges to finance Weatherman activities and sentenced to a ten-year term in federal prison. In June 1972, Steen attempted to be an informant for the FBI about the February 1970 San Francisco Park Station Bombing. Steen was featured on a segment of 60 Minutes, "Fake ID", in an interview with Mike Wallace, first aired on February 1, 1976. He was asked about false identities and traveler's check fraud.
