= Flint War Council =

Weather Underground party congress

The Flint War Council (also known as the SDS National War Council or the Wargasm) was a series of meetings of the Weather Underground Organization (WUO) and associates in Flint, Michigan, that took place from 27 December 1969 to 31 December 1969. During these meetings, the decisions were made for the WUO to go underground, to "engage in guerilla warfare against the U.S. government," and to abolish Students for a Democratic Society (SDS).

== Location ==
The War Council took place in a dance hall in the middle of the "black ghetto" in Flint, Michigan. There was a dried blood stain in the corner of the ballroom, the residue from where a shooting had taken place the night before. Mark Rudd would later say that this made the ballroom a "fitting place" to hold the War Council. For the event, the ballroom was decorated with revolutionary slogans and imagery. There were pictures of Malcolm X, Che Guevara, Fidel Castro, Ho Chi Minh, Vladimir Lenin, Mao Tse-tung, and other revolutionary figures influential to members of Weather. One wall was filled with pictures of Fred Hampton, the Black Panther leader recently killed by Chicago police. Slogans included "Sirhan Sirhan Power" and "Piece Now" over the picture of a gun. There was also a giant papier-mâché gun, with bullets attached to pictures of President Richard Nixon, Vice-President Spiro Agnew, California Governor Ronald Reagan, Chicago Mayor Richard J. Daley, and Sharon Tate, who had recently been murdered by Charles Manson and his cult followers.

== Decisions ==
Two important decisions were made during the War Council. The first of these decisions was to go underground, which stemmed from the fact that law enforcement was increasing pressure on the WUO and similar groups (as evidenced by the killing of Fred Hampton), as well as the belief that going underground was the best way to conduct guerrilla warfare against the U.S. government.

The practical effects of this decision dominated discussion at the War Council. Topics for discussion included how to obtain weapons, how to hide from law enforcement, and how violent the WUO should become in order to further the cause of domestic revolution in the United States. The targets of this violence were also discussed; there was even discussion about whether or not white babies were legitimate targets for the group.

In a meeting of WUO leadership conducted behind closed doors, the second decision was to disband what remained of SDS (despite the fact that the gathering had been advertised as the "SDS National War Council" beforehand). This decision reflected the splintering of SDS into hostile rival factions. Rather than try to rebuild SDS from underground, the WUO decided to abandon it altogether. Rudd would call the dissolution of SDS, "[T]he single greatest mistake… of my life… It was a historical crime." Because of the difficulties in recruiting from underground, and the decision to dissolve SDS, the WUO effectively limited the size and growth potential of the organization.

== Speeches ==
During the course of the War Council, several of the leading members of the WUO gave impassioned speeches designed, as Judy Siff later said, to "really psych [the group] up." Some of these speeches would become very controversial.

Mark Rudd gave a speech in which he described himself as a "monomaniacal" "Captain Ahab" set out to kill "the white whale of imperialism," and speculated that killing a "pig" or blowing up a building would be a "really wonderful feeling."

In her speech, Bernardine Dohrn praised the actions of the Manson family (although she would later claim that the speech was meant to be satirical), saying, "Dig it; first they killed those pigs, then they ate dinner in the room with them, then they even shoved a fork into pig Tate's stomach. Wild!" Holding up four fingers (symbolizing the fork) became the WUO's salute during the War Council.

== Historical Perspectives ==
The Flint War Council has been controversial with historians and former WUO members because of some of the statements made during the event. Even during the event, according to a reporter present, many of the speeches delivered at the War Council "stunned" those who were not part of the WUO. Former members of the WUO have had similar reactions when looking back on the events at the War Council. Jeff Jones later called the speeches an example of "group psychosis," and Mark Rudd described them as "madness." Susan Stern called the speeches praising Manson, "[T]he last putrid drop of American poison" in the WUO. Cathy Wilkerson said that, although some may have seen the events of the War Council as theatre, to her the sentiments expressed were "deadly serious."

Historians' evaluations of the War Council have also differed. Dan Berger calls the War Council a "[S]pectacle… an expression of outrage, but one whose hyperbole was self-evident." Jeremy Varon says, [A]n air of unreality hung over the Weatherman's menacing performances, further confusing just what to make of their "message". Todd Gitlin described the speeches as "a public rite to exorcise the Weathermen's last doubts."

== Other activities ==
During the War Council, the WUO held a number of communal activities, including sessions of karate practice, and singing from the "Weatherman songbook," which replaced the lyrics of popular songs with revolutionary messages. One example was "White Riot," sung to the tune of "White Christmas," and containing the lyrics, "I'm dreaming of a white riot/ Just like the one October 8 [referencing the "Days of Rage" in Chicago]/ When the pigs take a beating/ And things start leading/ To armed war against the state." At night, there was a party atmosphere, with dancing, a "good deal of free-for-all sexual activity," and discreet drug use (discretion was required because the WUO did not want to give the police a reason to raid the War Council).

== Attendees ==
Around 300 people attended the War Council. Among the groups represented, besides the WUO, were the Detroit White Panthers, the Bay Area Collective, and RYM II. According to the FBI, the following people "are known to have attended this convention":

- Karen Ashley
- William Ayers
- Kathie [sic] Boudin
- Jeffrey Blum
- Robert Burlingham
- David Camp
- Peter Clapp
- Edith Crichton
- Mona Cunningham
- Marc Dinsmore
- Brian Flanagan
- Laura Foner
- John Fuerst
- Lynn Raye Garvin
- David Gilbert
- Theodore Gold
- Joyce Greenways
- Leonard Handlesman
- Phoebe Hirsch
- John Jacobs
- Naomi Jaffe
- Jeff Jones
- Michael Junstesen
- David Klafter
- Nancy Kurshan
- Karen Latimer
- Jonathon Lerner
- Connie Long (Ullman)
- Howard Machtinger
- Jeffrey Melish
- James Mellen
- Raymond Moser
- Russel Neufeld
- Diana Oughton
- Jed Proujansky
- Eleanor Raskin
- Natalee Rosenstein
- Mark Rudd
- Marguerite Smith
- Michael Speigel
- Jane Spielman
- Barry Stein
- Malorie Tolles
- Robert Tomaschavsky
- Clayton Van Lydegraf
- Mary Wozniak
