= Scott Braley =

American activist

- Born: March 26, 1947 (age 79); Midland, Michigan
- Occupations: Photographer and activist
- Known for: Former member of the Weather Underground Organization

Scott Braley (born March 26, 1947) was a leftist activist and a regional organizer for the Michigan State University's chapter of the Students for a Democratic Society, better known as SDS. Braley became a member of Weatherman (later known as Weather Underground Organization) in 1969 and remained so until the group disbanded in 1977. Braley was one of the original members of the Revolutionary Youth Movement, a group devoted to anti-racism and Third World struggles which later evolved into Weatherman.

== Revolutionary beginnings ==
Martin Luther King Jr. was an inspiration for Scott Braley, and the reason for Braley's desire to see an escalation in the struggle for equal rights. "It seemed like a pretty clear choice," Braley was quoted as saying, "To be on the immoral and historically losing side of white supremacy, or to join a vibrant struggle for liberation around the world." It was because of MLK that Braley dropped out of school in 1967 and started organizing SDS chapters in his area full-time.

== Flint War Council ==
Braley attended the December 1969 SDS National Meeting, held in Flint, Michigan and later called the Flint War Council. It was during this meeting that members of Weatherman officially decided to move underground. Attendees at the War Council discussed issues such as women's liberation, youth culture, and the imperialism that existed in the events of the Vietnam War. SDS demonstrated these issues and opinions through satirical Christmas carols and spinoffs of popular songs, such as changing the lyrics to the Supremes' "Stop! In the Name of Love" to "Stop This Imperialist Plunder." Government documents note that the room in which the SDS National War Council was held was rented under Braley's name.

== Hampton-Clark murders ==
Government surveillance and violence against civil rights leaders served to strengthen Scott Braley's political resolve. Fred Hampton was an activist and the leader of the Chicago chapter of the Black Panthers. Considered by Weather members to be a comrade in the struggle for black rights, Hampton criticized Weatherman actions, especially those used in the Days of Rage, calling the group opportunistic and chauvinistic. Two months after the Days of Rage in 1969, Hampton was found murdered in his apartment, along with fellow Black Panther Mark Clark. When the murder was linked to the FBI, Braley was quoted as saying that the murders proved that "the stakes really were what we thought they were."

== Underground ==
Braley remained underground with the group until the dissolution of WUO in 1977. Originally opposed to the suggestion of surfacing, Braley stated in an interview excerpted in Dan Berger's book Outlaws of America that the decision was tormenting.

== Red Dragon Print Collective ==
In 1973, the Weather Underground Organization established a printing operation called the Red Dragon Print Collective, a venture which Braley helped run. Operating out of a soundproof apartment, the print collective was a formative part of the Weather Underground Organization for its final three years. The Red Dragon Print Collective was responsible for producing the Weather Underground Organization's book Prairie Fire. All printing, binding, and collating of materials was done by the members themselves. As a precaution, work was done wearing gloves to ensure that no fingerprints would be left.

== Later life ==
Scott Braley lives in Oakland, California where he works as a photographer for social justice and non-profit organizations.

== Notes ==
See References below for publications cited
