= Dianne Donghi =

French weatherwoman (born 1949)

Dianne Marie Donghi
- Born: February 11, 1949 (age 77); Neuville-sur-Seine, France
- Other names: Dionne Donghi, Dianne Marie Spiegel, Dianne Donghi Oberman
- Known for: Former member of the 1970s group Weather Underground Organization

Dianne Marie Donghi (born 11 February 1949 in Neuville-sur-Seine, France) is a French former member of Students for a Democratic Society (1960 organization) and Weatherman (organization).

== SDS ==
Donghi was identified as a leader of Students for a Democratic Society (SDS) and a member of Weatherman by the Senate Internal Security Subcommittee (SISS) investigative report. She was affiliated with the Columbia University SDS chapter as well as the New York chapter. During July 1969, Donghi was one of the SDS Weatherwomen who traveled with Bernardine Dohrn to Havana, Cuba to meet and talk with representatives of Cuba, National Liberation Front of South Vietnam (NLF) and the North Vietnamese governments. Donghi spoke at a press conference held on August 19, 1969 at the New York City Diplomat Hotel after the group returned home from Cuba. She also spoke at a National Action Conference held in Cleveland, Ohio during August 29-September 2, 1969. In preparation for Action Week in Chicago, Illinois, Donghi as well as Bernardine Dohrn, Linda Sue Evans, Mark Rudd and Jeff Jones helped to organize and recruit support for the October 8–11, 1969 Days of Rage, an event where Donghi herself was arrested and considered by FBI to be a co-conspirator. On October 11, 1969 Donghi was arrested for mob actions, which she pleaded guilty on December 16, 1969; she was fined a $90 fee and sentenced to serve one day in the county jail. In December 1969, Donghi was one of many who attended the Weatherman "War Council" in Flint, Michigan.

== Weatherman ==
Donghi became affiliated with Weatherman Cincinnati collective in Ohio on January 15, 1970. She eventually became sole leader of the collective. Later Donghi spent time at the Chicago and New York collectives. Sometime in February 1970, Donghi was arrested in Chicago by the FBI on charges of interstate transportation of stolen weapons. The case was thrown out by the U.S. Attorney because it had been set up by an inside informer of Weatherman. On April 15, 1970, after attempting to forge checks using a false name, Donghi and good friend Linda Sue Evans were arrested in New York City. Donghi was arrested in the Greenwich Village hotel room she had shared with Cincinnati collective member Larry Grathwohl (alias Tom Niehman), with whom she had formed a relationship. Donghi and others had been suspicious of Grathwohl, who was in fact an undercover FBI informant. Grathwohl had to blow his cover in order to facilitate the arrest. Donghi was released from jail later that day with a bail of $10,000. On July 23, after being sought out by authorities for fugitive warrants on other federal or local cases, Donghi, Linda Sue Evans, Mark Rudd, Bernardine Dohrn, Bill Ayers, Kathy Boudin, Cathy Wilkerson, Russ Neufeld, Jane Spielman, Ronald Fliegelman, Arlo Jacobs, Naomi Jaffe and Larry Grathwohl were indicted for conspiracy to bomb police stations and government buildings in four cities and to harm people inside. After attending her court hearings, Donghi decided to become a part of the WUO's above ground support.
