= Mother Right and the WUO =

Mother Right was a 10-page manifesto written in 1974 by Jane Alpert, a former Swarthmore College student, radical leftist feminist and associate of the Weather Underground Organization.

== Background ==
The WUO, a now defunct radical leftist faction formed from the Students for a Democratic Society (SDS), was created to raise public attention to the United States involvement to the Vietnam War with more violent methods to overthrow the government. It was known for its close coalition with non-members that also hid underground, including Jane Alpert, a former Swarthmore College student and radical leftist feminist who wrote for Rat, a New York underground newspaper for most of her life. Despite sharing similar views on anti-imperialism, there had been inner tensions among the members and non-members in regard to finding a universal purpose of fighting the Vietnam War. Particularly, this tension was felt between Alpert and the WUO; she proved to be a primary antagonist to the WUO for her radical feminism and drawing controversy not only from the outside but also from the inside. Although she was never a member of the WUO or SDS, Alpert nonetheless played an important role in WUO's development and shared her views of feminism with the Weatherwomen. Because she shared similar intimidation methods as the Weathermen, Alpert allied with them to strengthen her political views and hatred of the U.S. government.

Prior to WUO's development, Alpert first became involved in radical politics upon attending Swarthmore College in 1967. She met her lover, Sam Melville, at her first demonstration of the Community Action Committee. Along with Melville, she participated in intimidation methods against the U.S. government, in response to the Vietnam War. She first went underground after refusing to accept her parents' bailout for her arrest in the bombings. The idea of bombing a public building originated from reading Ayn Rand's The Fountainhead, considering bombing as "a morally legitimate form of protest" For four years underground, Alpert worked closely with Weatherwomen, such as Bernardine Dohrn and Kathy Boudin, and helped conspire to overthrow the U.S. government. Along with the bombings of public buildings such as Chase Manhattan Bank, Alpert also wrote to the press of the WUO's further intentions. She addressed her famous manifesto to the Weatherwomen published in 1974 in Ms. Magazine entitled "Mother Right: A New Feminist Theory." The manifesto drew criticism from the WUO through letters in response to Alpert, for her "retrograde version of feminism....focusing on white self-interest and the dying left." It also spurred a less than desirable response from the non-WUO members as well for they had a different view of feminism than Alpert's vision.

== Mother Right ==
"Mother Right" originated during Alpert's first year underground when she joined a consciousness-raising group that appealed to women of different backgrounds. The first half of the manifesto documented her conversion from leftist politics to radical feminism while underground. Bearing witness to their internal struggles, Alpert supported them in a way that she considered them capable of "asserting themselves in the face of male hostility". This manifesto specifically addressed Alpert's stance on feminism as a necessity to define oneself as a woman in a society that valued patriarchy. She wrote "Mother Right" because of her view on motherhood as "the only concrete expression of that potential that defines all women". She asserted that although women share a universal role of a nurturing caregiver in the household, they also held as much power as men did. Her claim that biology determined the "essential difference between men and women" catalyzed her reason to encourage the Weatherwomen to separate themselves from their male counterparts and adopt a matriarchal perspective.

Though "Mother Right" illustrated her strong separatist feminist views, Alpert inadvertently revealed a rather polarized view on men-women relationships in regard to the organization. She drew upon Bill Ayers and Mark Rudd as examples of men's universal treatment of their female partners, claiming them to be responsible for misguiding the Weatherwomen, having them "cooperating in their own demise". She then accused Ayers and Rudd of subordinating the women's movement in favor of opposing the bombings in Vietnam, but mainly denounced Rudd as "the embodiment of patriarchy in the mixed-gender Left as a whole".

Alpert revealed in the manifesto her own abusive relationship with Melville, filled with insults that he veiled as "compliments" and having affairs with other women at the same time. She called him a "sexist" for feeding into the "macho militancy that dominated the time". Their treatment of their respective partners at the time further confirmed Alpert's convictions of the men's "arrogance and insensitivity" toward the women's movement. She then closed the manifesto with the words: "I will mourn the loss of 42 male supremacists no longer", excluding Melville.

Alpert wrote "Mother Right" as part of her testimony of viewing motherhood as "the only concrete expression of that potential that defines all women". She asserted that though women were capable of motherhood, they also had as much power to lead as men had. Her biologically deterministic claims that men and women were essentially different from one another spurred criticism from the Weatherwomen, forcing some restructuring in their organization. In short, Alpert urged the Weatherwomen to separate from their male counterparts in order to achieve their own fight for feminism.

== Aftermath ==
The Weather Underground members as well as their fellow counterparts such as the Catonsville Nine disagreed with feminist separatism. The Catonsville Nine were a nine-person Catholic activist group, led by Jesuit priest Father Daniel Berrigan, who opposed Vietnam War by burning 378 draft files with their homemade napalm. They then went underground after being tried and sentenced for 18 years for destroying the draft files and interference with Selective Service Act of 1967. The Weatherwomen's collective letter expressed their disappointment with Alpert's retrograde feminism and articulated their own views of gender equality. Alpert's surrender to the FBI and "betrayal of information that could endanger the safety of other fugitives" drove the Weatherwomen to reevaluate their reason to fight for feminism. Though they wrote the letter to defend the WUO's role in the women's movement, the Weatherwomen lacked a universal purpose in regard to gender equality, "increasing polarizations and contradictions...by which [they] judged other women". They were judging other women based on lack of foundation in their commitment to WUO and their questionable relationships with their male partners.

Members of other organizations such as the Catonsville Nine shared the WUO's criticisms to Alpert's feminist separatism. Mary Moylan of the Catonsville Nine wrote a personal, but incendiary response to Alpert, criticizing her reactionary feminism and defending the WUO. Despite no interest in rejecting her feminist politics, Moylan reprimanded Alpert for reneging on her purpose of fighting for female identity by "emphasizing Woman as Victim" in order to assign blame on men. She shared her own background that led to her involvement in the Vietnam opposition and fight for gender equality that left her rather mentally exhausted in the process. In contrast to Alpert's segregated version of feminism, Moylan presented a more integrated version of how men and women should relate to one another. Another non-WUO member named Genevieve suggested to Alpert to make her manifesto more productive and give more reasons for the Weatherwomen to focus on feminism.

Alpert's correspondence with WUO provided an insight into the inner tensions between members and non-members while hiding underground in regard to their role in the Vietnam opposition and other social movements that occurred in their neighborhoods. Despite their united purpose to overthrow the government, no one could agree upon a central objective of their role in social issues such as gender equality.
