= 1970 San Francisco Police Department Park Station bombing =

1970 bombing in California, US

San Francisco Police Department Park Station bombing
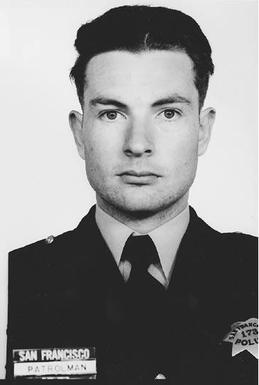
- Brian V. McDonnell, a sergeant with the San Francisco; Police Department who received fatal shrapnel wounds

- 1970 San Francisco Police Department Park Station bombing (San Francisco)
- Location: 37°46′4.44″N 122°27′19.09″W; Golden Gate Park Police Station, 1899 Waller Street, San Francisco, California, US
- Date: February 16, 1970
- Attack type: Bombing
- Weapon: A pipe bomb packed with heavy staples
- Deaths: 1
- Injuries: 9

On February 16, 1970, a pipe bomb filled with shrapnel detonated on the ledge of a window at the San Francisco Police Department's (SFPD) Upper Haight Park substation in San Francisco, United States. Brian V. McDonnell, a police sergeant, was fatally wounded in its blast. Robert Fogarty, another policeman, was severely wounded in his face and legs and was partially blinded. In addition, eight other policemen were wounded. The perpetrators were never caught. Authorities claimed that the Weather Underground was involved in the bombing, but this was never proven.

== Victim ==
McDonnell came from a family of police officers. He served in the Army Air Corps during World War II, joining the SFPD afterwards. He had two children.

== Investigation ==
San Francisco police investigated the Weather Underground as potential perpetrators of the bombing. In the 1970s, statements from police and FBI informants claimed the involvement of Weather Underground leaders Bernardine Dohrn, Howard Machtinger, and Jeff Jones. However the Weather Underground never claimed responsibility, as they did for other attacks. The Zodiac killer denied involvement in the bombing in a 1970 letter. FBI Informant Larry Grathwohl accused Bernadine Dohrn of carrying out the bombing in 1974 Senate testimony. In 1970-71, seven SFPD officers were killed, more than any comparable period in the department's history.

Grand juries probed the incident in 2001, 2005, and 2009 but did not release any findings. In 2009, the San Francisco police officers union accused Dohrn and Bill Ayers of participating in the bombing, citing Grathwohl's claim that he had heard Ayers confess involvement. Ayers denied this.

The case was unsolved as of 2026.

== Legacy ==
A plaque honoring McDonnell was installed on the station's wall in 2007.

== See also ==
- Crime in San Francisco
- List of unsolved murders (1900–1979)
- Terrorism in the United States
