= The Weather Underground (film) =

2002 documentary film by Sam Green and Bill Siegel

- U.S. DVD cover
- Directed by: Sam Green; Bill Siegel
- Starring: Bill Ayers; Bernardine Dohrn; Mark Rudd; Brian Flanagan; Naomi Jaffe; Laura Whitehorn; David Gilbert; Kathleen Neal Cleaver; Todd Gitlin
- Release date: 2002
- Running time: 95 minutes
- Country: United States
- Language: English
- Box office: $564,632

The Weather Underground is a 2002 documentary film based on the rise and fall of the American radical far-left organization Weather Underground. Using archival footage from the time as well as interviews with the Weathermen in the modern day, the film constructs a linear narrative of the organization and serves as a cautionary tale.

== Reception ==
=== Critical response ===
The Weather Underground has an approval rating of 91% on review aggregator website Rotten Tomatoes, based on 58 reviews, and an average rating of 7.79/10. The website's critical consensus states, "Fascinating documentary about the militant Weathermen". Metacritic assigned the film a weighted average score of 77 out of 100, based on 23 critics, indicating "generally favorable reviews".

=== Accolades ===
The film, directed by Sam Green and Bill Siegel, won the audience choice award at the Chicago Underground Film Festival and went on to be nominated for the Academy Award for Best Documentary Feature in 2004.

== See also ==
- Underground
- The Company You Keep
- American Pastoral, the 2016 film adaptation of Philip Roth's novel about American left-wing terrorism
