= National Guard Association of the United States bombing =

1970 National Guard Association of the United States Bombing
- Part of the New Communist movement and political violence in the United States during the Cold War
- Location: Washington, D.C.
- Date: May 10, 1970
- Target: National Guard Association of the United States
- Attack type: Bombing
- Perpetrator: Weather Underground

On May 10, 1970, the Weather Underground bombed the headquarters of the National Guard Association of the United States.

== Background ==
The bombing occurred less than a week after the Kent State shootings, when members of the National Guard opened fire on unarmed anti-Vietnam War protesters at Kent State University in Ohio. Four students were killed and nine were wounded.

== Bombing ==
The explosive deceive was enclosed in a briefcase. Windows in the building and surrounding area were blown out. The Weather Underground Organization claimed responsibility for the attack in a May 21, 1970 communique.
