= Bill Siegel =

American documentary film producer and director (1962–2018)

- Born: December 24, 1962; Minneapolis, Minnesota
- Died: December 9, 2018 (aged 55); Chicago, Illinois
- Citizenship: American
- Occupation: Film director
- Notable work: The Trials of Muhammad Ali; The Weather Underground

Bill Siegel (December 24, 1962 – December 9, 2018) was an American documentary film producer and director. Documentaries directed by Siegel include Emmy Award-winning The Trials of Muhammad Ali in 2013 and the Academy Award-nominated The Weather Underground in 2002.

In addition to his filmmaking, Siegel worked a day job at The Great Books Foundation, serving in roles ranging from Trainer to Vice President of School Programs. Bill honed his craft as prober of people's thinking during his 23 years at Great Books, where he led more than 1000 seminars guiding thousands of teachers to take on a Socratic approach.

Bill earned a B.A. in history from the University of Wisconsin at Madison and an M.S. degree at the Columbia University School of Journalism.

Siegel's final completed film project was a study guide for Ken Burns and Lynne Novick's documentary series, The Vietnam War. His final documentary-in-process, America Sells Itself, mines the archives of the United States Information Agency (USIA) to investigate the U.S. government's Cold War era effort to sell American- style democracy.

== Early life ==
Siegel grew up in Minneapolis, Minnesota. He was born into a secular, Jewish family, the descendant of Russian Jewish and Finnish immigrants. His father, Dick, served for 47 years as an attorney with Siegel, Brill, Greupner, Duffy & Foster P.A. His mother, Libby, served as the principal of the newly co-educational Blake School.

In Bill Siegel's young adulthood, he became increasingly devoted to and curious about social justice and politics. Following graduate school Bill worked on archival film research for projects on Muhammad Ali, which led to a research job on Hoop Dreams.
