= Silas Bissell =

American activist

- Born: April 27, 1942; Grand Rapids, Michigan
- Died: June 15, 2002 (aged 60); Eugene, Oregon
- Other name: Terrance Peter Jackson
- Occupations: Artist, Physical Therapist
- Known for: Former member of the 1970s group Weatherman (Organization)

Silas Bissell (April 27, 1942 – June 15, 2002) was an American activist and artist. He joined The Weatherman movement for a brief time before going underground after planting a bomb at the University of Washington's ROTC building. Bissell was arrested after 17 years of being underground and served 18 months in jail.

== Early life ==
Silas Trim Bissell was born April 27, 1942. Bissell’s father, Wadsworth, was the grandson of the founder of the Bissell carpet sweeper company. Silas’ mother, Hillary Nelle Rarden, was a Marxist-civil rights activist and encouraged her son to be the same. Bissell went to the University of Michigan, where he was awarded three Hopwood Awards for poetry. He fell in love with Judith Emily Siff, a New Yorker and they later married. He was arrested during his senior year of high school for taking part in a sit-in. Bissell graduated with a bachelor's degree in English literature in 1964 and then went to Syracuse University and graduated with a master's degree in creative writing in 1965.

When Robert F. Kennedy and Martin Luther King Jr. were assassinated and activists stormed Chicago during the 1968 Democratic National Convention, Silas and Judith joined a Seattle draft resistance group. They were soon drawn to the Weatherman organization.

== Weatherman ==
Because they were a married couple in a movement that perceived the practice of monogamy as bourgeois, the Bissells were challenged by the members of Weatherman to prove their dedication. Their chance came on January 17, 1970, after being asked to place a bomb at the University of Washington.

They placed a home-made bomb under the steps of the University’s ROTC building. It did not go off because the Bissells made mistakes with the wiring. They were captured by the campus police almost immediately, making them think they had been framed by the members of Weatherman.

Although it has been reported that Bissell was a member of the Weatherman, his widow Ruth disputes the allegation, though she reports that Bissell repeatedly said, "I would have if they'd have taken me."

== Underground ==
The Bissells posted the $50,000 in bonds and were planning to face the court in Seattle until, Bissell claims, Weatherman Mark Rudd told them to go underground. Traveling by bus and train, they relocated from Seattle to San Francisco, but were now shunned by fellow Weathermen. They ended up in Boston, where the mounting pressures of hiding finally ate away at the marriage. They divorced in 1970.

In the early 1970s, he lived in Ithaca, New York, where he worked in a food co-op and was not politically active. He then moved to Eugene, Oregon, where he took a job as a nurse's assistant. He continued his artwork and playing music. He went back to university and earned a bachelor's degree in biology from North Carolina Central University in 1979 and a master's degree in physical therapy from Duke University in 1981. He then moved to Eugene, Oregon, and started work as a physical therapist.

== Arrest ==
On January 29, 1987, he was arrested at home by FBI agents who said they had received an anonymous tip from an I.D. on a wanted poster. Once again Bissell believed that he was turned in to the FBI in Eugene by a close friend for the $5,500 reward. Bissell was charged with conspiracy to destroy federal property and possession of a bomb in connection to an attempt to destroy the University of Washington ROTC building. He was sentenced to two years imprisonment but was released after only eighteen months in custody. While behind bars, he married Ruth Evan, a school teacher. They had been at high school together in Grand Rapids, and she had written letters to him while he was in prison.

== After release ==
After Bissell's release he and Ruth moved back to Eugene, where he became devoted to sculpture and painting. He achieved success, showing in many West Coast galleries. He used the proceeds from the sale of his work to fund human rights work. In 1993, he founded the Campaign for Labor Rights, a nationwide organization fighting sweatshop conditions in factories around the globe, and was the national director for many years. Even when he became semi-paralyzed after special chemotherapy for the cancer that was diagnosed in 2000, Bissell never stopped his work as an artist up until his death.

Silas Trim Bissell died at age 60 in Eugene of cancer of the brain on June 15, 2002.
