= Phoebe Hirsch =

American activist

Phoebe Elizabeth Hirsch
- Born: December 5, 1945 (age 80); New York City, New York
- Other names: Sue Elinda Cohen
- Known for: Former member of the 1970s group Weather Underground Organization

Phoebe Elizabeth Hirsch (born 1949) is a former member of Students for a Democratic Society (SDS) and Weatherman (WUO).

== Early education and activism ==
Phoebe Hirsch attended the University of Wisconsin in the 1960s. Hirsch participated with SDS during the riots at Columbia University in New York City in 1968.

SDS used the riots to pursue confronting two issues with Columbia University; the proposed building of the university gym in Harlem that would not benefit the largely poor, African-American population; and the involvement of the University with the Institute for Defense Analysis who provided research that the military used in Vietnam. She was employed in the SDS National Office located in Chicago from June to August, 1969.

== SDS activities ==
A series of protest demonstrations called "Days of Rage" in Chicago, Illinois took place on October 8–11, 1969. The purpose of the "Days of Rage" was to encourage and show strength of the SDS organization, and bring in new members, to participate in revolutionary violence against the Vietnam War. Members gathered at Grant Park to listen to SDS leaders' speeches about Che Guevara and the world revolution. The last speech encouraged members to walk to the Drake Hotel, which was the home of Federal Judge Julius Hoffman.

Judge Hoffman was presiding judge at the Chicago 8 trial. Hirsch was arrested with members Cathlyn Platt Wilkerson, Michael Spiegel, Mark Rudd and other demonstrators who pleaded guilty to mob-action charges. Hirsch participated in a leading role from Chicago, for the Venceremos Brigade. She provided arrangements to send SDS members to Cuba to help cut sugar cane for the 1970 harvest. Hirsch was one of many SDS members who attended the "War Council" in Flint, Michigan on December 27–31, 1969. This was the last public meeting of SDS members before splintering off to form Weatherman.

== Weatherman ==
Hirsch went underground in Illinois in early 1970 as a fugitive. In April 1970, she was arrested in California using a fictitious identity. She jumped bond and re-submerged until 1977. Hirsch surfaced with fellow Weatherman members Robert Roth and Peter Clapp, who were all living in Chicago. They turned themselves in at the Cook County Courthouse on March 25, 1977. Hirsch pleaded guilty to mob-action charges, and received a $1,000 fine and two years probation.
