= Howard Machtinger =

American educator and activist

- Born: April 26, 1946
- Died: July 24, 2024 (aged 78)

Academic background
- Education: Columbia University (BA); University of Chicago; San Francisco State University (MA)

Academic work
- Discipline: Education studies
- Institutions: University of North Carolina at Chapel Hill

Howard Norton Machtinger (April 26, 1946 – July 24, 2024) was a director of Carolina Teaching Fellows, a student teacher scholarship program at the University of North Carolina. He was an education and civil rights activist, a teacher, a forum leader, and a political commentator. In earlier life, Machtinger was a member of Students For a Democratic Society (SDS) and Weatherman.

== Early education and activism ==
Howard ("Howie") Machtinger was born in the Bronx, New York, on April 23, 1946. He was born to "Harry" Herszla Machtinger and Yetta [Migden], who were Polish-Jewish immigrants. His siblings included Barbara, Evelyn and Leonard. Ted Gold was a cousin; his mother Ruth Migden was the sister of Yetta Migden. His uncle (on his mother's side) was economist Herbert E. Klarman.

Machtinger earned his baccalaureate degree cum laude in Sociology and English from Columbia University, in 1966. While a student at Columbia, besides playing on the tennis team, he attended the Russell Tribunal, where he heard U.S. army personnel describe torture, the use of napalm, and Agent Orange, an experience that contributed to his becoming an antiwar activist. He became an active SDS member while he was a graduate student in sociology at the University of Chicago in 1968. Machtinger was a regional director of SDS from autumn of 1968 until the SDS split, and made contributions to New Left Notes, an SDS publication. He was part of a steering committee which took over the administration building at University of Chicago on January 30, 1969. During the takeover, 300 students occupied the university's administration building, protesting the non-renewal of Marlene Dixon's contract with the Sociology department. Students believed the department voted her out because she was a woman with politically radical views.

== Weatherman ==
Machtinger was one of the founding members of Weatherman (later known as the Weather Underground), an organization that formed as a result of the SDS split in June 1969. He was a part of the Revolutionary Youth Movement (RYM), a faction of SDS who believed revolution was imperative. Machtinger, like other members of RYM, criticized members of the Progressive Labor (PL) faction of SDS for placing emphasis on the class struggle rather than focusing on the issue of racism, which he viewed as a dire problem plaguing America. Machtinger was one of the eleven co-authors of the Weatherman statement, which appeared in the issue of New Left Notes presented at the 1969 SDS National Convention in Chicago. Machtinger co-wrote "You Don't Need a Weatherman to Know Which Way the Wind Blows" with Bernardine Dohrn, Bill Ayers, Jeff Jones, Mark Rudd, John Jacobs, Terry Robbins, Jim Mellen, Karin Ashley, Gerry Long, and Steve Tappis. Machtinger participated in the Days of Rage and was present at the Flint, Michigan "War Council" in December 1969. He was among the Weathermen who eventually went underground. Machtinger acknowledged carrying out a February 1970 bomb attack on a police station in Berkeley that resulted in one serious injury, during Weatherman's early days.

== Indictment and life underground ==
On April 2, 1970, Machtinger was indicted with twelve other Weatherman members on charges of conspiracy and violation of the Federal Antiriot Act during the Days of Rage. He was accused of leading Days of Rage but the charges were dismissed as electronic surveillance had not been court-ordered. Machtinger was indicted again on July 24, 1970. Along with ten other members of Weather, Machtinger was charged with conspiring to bomb the Detroit Police Officers Association Building. He went underground in the early 1970s and was arrested on East 86th Street in New York on September 19, 1973. Machtinger was released on bail, and subsequently went back underground. Upon averting jail time, Machtinger released a statement to the press explaining his desire to remain underground and to continue working for Weather's Cause. In his letter, written October 16, 1973, Machtinger explores the dilemma of being a revolutionary fugitive in the following excerpt:

What should I do? Go to jail and do time--for how long?...Do my political work behind steel bars, get out and figure a new way to integrate myself in the revolution? Or, if I had the opportunity, return to what I had been doing: trying to build secret--from the state power--bases of strength as one means of aiding in the overthrow of the imperialist, sexist, racist state.

== Resurfacing and recent history ==
Machtinger surrendered in Criminal Court on May 11, 1978. Upon resurfacing, he continued to pursue education, earning an A.A.S degree in computer science and business technology from Seattle Central Community College in 1981. He taught high school history from 1993 until he received his master's degree in history from San Francisco State University in 1996. Machtinger's 1995 dissertation, titled Clearing Away the Debris : New Left Radicalism in 1960s America, further explores the New Left movement of the 1960s. He served on the planning committee for East Chapel Hill High School from 1995 to 1996 and is a former member of the North Carolina Humanities Council Forum Speakers. In 1998, Machtinger helped organize a visit of South African educators and students to the Triangle area to promote cross-cultural communication and understanding of educational issues. He is an activist for educational reform and wrote two articles in 2007 for the High School Journal, titled "After the Flood: The Impact of Katrina on Education in New Orleans" and "What Do We Know about High Poverty Schools? Summary of the High Poverty Schools Conference at Chapel Hill." Machtinger worked for the School of Education at University of North Carolina at Chapel Hill from July 19, 1999, to June 30, 2006.

In 2009, Machtinger published a discussion of Weather Underground history, concluding with a repudiation of its tactics:

While we in the WU did not, by some grace, become terrorists, we were wrong and destructive. We did lose our way. We were not demons, but we did succumb to our own fantasy of revolutionary pride... Despite the desperation of any given political moment, we can only have a chance at success by deeply understanding that our goal must be to build humane power. We must remain alert to opportunities in current political realities, rather than act out fantasies of revolutionary prowess in frustration.

He died in Durham on July 24, 2024. His obituary in the Columbia University alumni magazine describes him as having been "a public high school teacher and director of a teacher training program at UNC Chapel Hill, a social justice organizer who mentored many young activists and a steadfast friend to many throughout his life."

== Bibliography ==
- "Analysis of the Youth Movement." New Left Notes, January 22, 1969.
- "Letter From Howard Machtinger." The Weather Eye; Communiques from the Weather Underground May 1970-May 1974. Union Square Press, 1974.
- "Clearing Away the Debris: New Left Radicalism in 1960s America." Thesis (M.A.)--San Francisco State University, 1995.
- "Howard Machtinger On the 30th Anniversary of the end of the American War in Viet Nam." New Left Notes, June 1, 2006.
- "After the Flood: The Impact of Katrina on Education in New Orleans." High School Journal, 90. No.2 (2007).
- "What Do We Know About High Poverty Schools? Summary of the High Poverty Schools Conference at UNC-Chapel Hill." High School Journal, 90. No. 3 (2007).
- "You Say You Want a Revolution." In These Times, February 18, 2009.
