= Neuville-sur-Seine =

Commune in Grand Est, France

Neuville sur Seine
- Commune
- Coat of arms
- Location of Neuville sur Seine
- Location within France Location within Grand Est
- Coordinates: 48°02′34″N 4°24′43″E
- Country: France
- Region: Grand Est
- Department: Aube
- Arrondissement: Troyes
- Canton: Bar-sur-Seine

Government
  - Mayor (2020–2026): Gérard Hugot
- Area^{1}: 14.42 km^{2} (5.57 sq mi)
- Elevation: 167 m (548 ft)
- Population (2023): 376
  - Density: 26.1/km^{2} (67.5/sq mi)
- Time zone: UTC+01:00 (CET)
  - Summer (DST): UTC+02:00 (CEST)
- INSEE/Postal code: 10262 /10250
- ^{1} French Land Register data, which excludes lakes, ponds, glaciers > 1 km^{2} (0.386 sq mi or 247 acres) and river estuaries.

Neuville-sur-Seine (French pronunciation: [nøvil syʁ sɛn], literally Neuville on Seine) is a commune in the Aube department in north-central France.

== Population ==
Historical population
Year	Pop.	±% p.a.
1968	391	—
1975	380	−0.41%
1982	346	−1.33%
1990	357	+0.39%
1999	351	−0.19%
2007	366	+0.52%
2012	417	+2.64%
2017	454	+1.71%
2023	376	−3.09%
Source: INSEE

== See also ==
- Communes of the Aube department
