= Women's Brigade of Weather Underground =

Feminist wing of the Weather Underground

- The Proud Eagle Tribe
- The Weather Underground logo
- Leader: Bernardine Dohrn
- Dates active: 1970?-1973?
- Ideology: Feminism; Marxism–Leninism; Communism; Anti-imperialism
- Size: 70
- Part of: Weather Underground
- Wars: the Black Power movement and the Opposition to the Vietnam War

Initially called "The Proud Eagle Tribe," the communiqué from the Women's Brigade of the Weather Underground pledged to "build a militant women's movement that commits itself to the destruction of Amerikan imperialism" and exploit "the man's chauvinism" as a "strategic weakness."

== Description ==
The Women's Brigade was made up of seventy members, led by Bernardine Dohrn. Their activities, although sensationalized for publicity purposes, were primarily confined to the levels of sympathizers and spies. The internal policies of WUO strictly defined as well as limited women's contributions within the group. The WUO required members to live in "weather collectives" in an effort to reject the bourgeois society. All female members were required to have sex with all male members, and women also had sexual relations with other women, as monogamous relationships were considered "counterrevolutionary." Revolution was considered to be the top priority, therefore, new mothers were required to give their babies to lower-ranking members if they appeared to be overly distracted from their political goals.

== Actions ==
October 14, 1970 - The Women's Brigade bomb the Center for International Affairs at Harvard University (Note: According to the book, Harvard's Jews, Women, and Blacks by Morton and Phyllis Keller, in the 1960s, there were only four female professors out of 427 on the faculty. One in twenty law students was a female, compared to an equal number of men and women in the early 2000s. The University was predominantly male, and women were not allowed to fully become co-residences on campus until 1972.) and is conducted in solidarity with Angela Davis, a political activist who had recently been arrested. The bombing is considered to be the first action taken by the Brigade. The women choose an institution tied to the Vietnam War as their target in order to contest the current notion among some feminists that Vietnam was not a women's issue.

July 24, 1973 - A Collective Letter to the Women's Movement (Note: This letter can be found in To Sing a Battle Song edited by Bernardine Dohrn, Bill Ayers and Jeff Jones. (New York: Seven Stories Press, 2006), 199-207.) is released by the Brigade as an attempt to engage the women's movement in debate around feminist politics and how it relates to other struggles. It is also meant to denounce Jane Alpert who was temporarily provided sanctuary by Weather cells whiles she was underground as a result of non-Weather-related bombings in New York. When Alpert re-surfaced, she denounced the Weather Underground Organization and armed struggle.

March 6, 1974 - The Women's Brigade bomb the San Francisco Department of Health, Education, and Welfare (HEW) offices. (Note: See text under the "Mountain Moving Day and Six Sisters" heading to read about what HEW represented to the women's group.) WUO states that this is in honor of International Women's Day (March 8) and in remembrance of Weatherman members Diana Oughton, Ted Gold and Terry Robbins. The Brigade argues in its communiqué (Note: This communiqué can be found in To Sing a Battle Song edited by Bernardine Dohrn, Bill Ayers and Jeff Jones. (New York: Seven Stories Press, 2006), 214-215.) for women to take control of daycare, health care, birth control and other aspects of women's daily lives. This was the final bombing carried out by the all-women group which had by now abandoned the "Proud Eagle Tribe" name.

== Mountain Moving Day and Six Sisters ==
In January 1973, "Mountain Moving Day" was a circulated document that attempted to untangle the WUO's inconsistent politics regarding women's liberation and to determine a new direction in light of the January 1973 cease-fire between the United States and Vietnam. With the war on hiatus, Weatherwomen were encouraged to seize this chance to delve deeper into feminism, study, organizing, writings and actions. The article argued for the centrality of women's liberation due to the Weather's public weakness on feminism and because women's liberation struggle is and will be one of the important and decisive ones globally. The paper also encouraged WUO's immersion in the women's movement, to push for internationalism and anti-racism as well as learning and benefiting from what the women's liberation movement had to offer. The document acknowledged that feminism would be an uphill battle because much of the women's movement felt at odds with the Weather Underground.

"Mountain Moving Day" resulted in a feminist initiative within WUO, which centered upon three goals: (1) "To encourage solidarity among women, to make work among women a priority (geographically, structurally, programmatically), (2) To develop a women's program for and about women; to actively participate in building the women's movement, (3) To recognize the need for solidarity among men." Women raised criticisms while the organization was falling apart and afterward suggest that these policies were not consistently applied. The principles say nothing directly about the biggest obstacle to women's liberation: male supremacy and how WUO as a whole could fight it.

The impact of the article, however, was significant if only for women in the group. Six months after this historic document was circulated, WUO women initiated a summer project which was a six-week study group by women underground working with some key above ground supporters, which focused upon female oppression and its relationship to anti-imperialist politics. The group specifically focused on HEW, which they called the "major government vehicle of social control of women," comparing it to the Bureau of Indian Affairs.

The women who convened the study distributed a packet entitled: "Six Sisters," which explained their motivations, their wide-ranging reading list, meeting notes and plans for action. Weatherwomen started to bond over common experiences and shared commitments in a way that had once eluded them. Solidarity was engendered and some began living in all-women collectives.

== Bibliography ==
- Berger, Dan. Outlaws of America. (Oakland, CA: AK Press, 2006).
- Gilbert, David. Students For a Democratic Society and the Weather Underground Organization. (Canada: Abraham Guillen Press, 2002).
- Gonzalez-Perez, Margaret. Women and Terrorism. (New York, New York: Routledge, 2008).
