= Revolutionary Youth Movement =

- Founded: 1968; 58 years ago
- Ideology: Communism; Marxism-Leninism; Maoism
- Political position: Far-left

In the United States, the Revolutionary Youth Movement (RYM) was the section of Students for a Democratic Society (SDS) that opposed the Worker Student Alliance of the Progressive Labor Party (PLP). Most of the national leadership of SDS joined the RYM in order to oppose PLP's party line and what they alleged to be its attempted takeover of the SDS leadership structure, particularly at the 1969 SDS convention in Chicago.

== History ==
The theoretical basis of the Revolutionary Youth Movement was an understanding that most of the American population, including both students and the so-called "middle class," comprised, due to their relationship to the instruments of production, the working class; thus the organizational basis of SDS, which had begun in the elite colleges and had been extended to public institutions as the organization grew, could be extended to youth as a whole, including students, those serving in the military, and the unemployed. Students could be viewed as workers gaining skills prior to employment. This contrasted with the Progressive Labor Party view which saw students and workers as being in separate categories which could ally, but should not jointly organize.

Politically, the RYM took issue with what they alleged was PLP's opposition to the right of self-determination for oppressed nations and ethnic groups. The RYM also criticized PLP's attacks on the Vietnamese National Liberation Front, whom PLP had accused of "selling out" to the U.S. during the Paris Peace Talks, as well as other criticisms. But most of all, the RYM opposed what it considered to be PLP's unfounded attacks on the Black Panther Party.

In the 1969 fragmentation of SDS, RYM departed the convention hall and declared itself the "real SDS" in a new space across the street. In splitting SDS, the RYM itself also split. One section of the RYM (referred to as RYM I), containing most of the SDS leadership including Bernardine Dohrn, David Gilbert and Mark Rudd, became the Weathermen. Weathermen briefly retained control of the SDS National Office and membership lists before dissolving SDS and closing its headquarters in 1970, in favor of pursuing illegal activities that it believed would help to spark revolution in the short term.

The other major section of the RYM, referred to as Revolutionary Youth Movement II, were Maoist-oriented and rejected the Weathermen's line of immediate armed struggle in the U.S., advocating building a new revolutionary vanguard party instead. RYM II, which was led by the former national secretary of SDS, Michael Klonsky, quickly gave way to various new revolutionary organizations and collectives. This milieu became known as the New Communist movement. The largest of the RYM II groups was the Bay Area Revolutionary Union, which soon absorbed some other groups and became the Revolutionary Communist Party, USA in 1975. The Communist Party (Marxist–Leninist) also evolved out of these disputes. Other members of RYM II joined the Sojourner Truth Organization, formed in 1969 and active in workplace struggles in the Chicago area. Sojourner Truth Organization, active mostly in the mid-west until its dissolution in 1985, differed from other groups in the New Communist movement in the initial influence of C. L. R. James and its combination of industrial placement with the struggle against white supremacy, developing a theory of the key role of the "white-skin privilege system" in the white US working class.

== See also ==
- Revolutionary Student Brigade
