= Clayton Van Lydegraf =

American writer and activist (1915–1992)

Clayton Van Lydegraf (May 6, 1915 – March 30, 1992) was a writer and activist of significant influence on the New Left in the 1960s. He served as Secretary of the Communist Party in Washington State in the late 1940s. During the 1970s he became a leader of the Weather Underground. He was arrested by the Federal Bureau of Investigation in November 1977.

== Biography ==
Van Lydegraf served as a leader of the Progressive Labor Party in Washington state in the 1960s before being expelled in the Spring of 1967. During this time, and expanding on his Old Left background, Van Lydegraf was involved with young Seattle activists by 1966. His articles "The Movement and the Workers" and "The Object is to Win" were particularly influential. This latter is a noteworthy piece in the development of the ideas of the Weather Underground.

Over the years, he was active in a number of groups and causes including the Communist Party, the Progressive Labor Party, the Peace and Freedom Party, Draft Resistance—Seattle, Students for a Democratic Society (SDS), the American Friends Service Committee, Anti-Fascist Front, Seattle Committee to End the War in Vietnam, and trade unions. He was an advocate of working class power, Marxism, revolutionary organization, and the Black Panthers. He took part in the preparations for the jailbreak of Timothy Leary while in the Weatherman organization but was privately critical of the action.

Van Lydegraf led a faction within the Weather Underground named the Revolutionary Committee (RC), which criticised the organisation's leadership for insufficient militancy, failure to ally themselves with black radicals, and patriarchal conduct. The RC ousted leaders Jeff Jones and Bernardine Dohrn, and took leadership of the organisation in Spring 1976. In November 1977 Van Lydegraf was arrested in Houston, Texas, and charged with a plan to bomb the office of John Briggs, a California State Senator. Four other Weather Underground members were arrested simultaneously, of whom two were also in Houston, and two were in Los Angeles.

== Bibliography ==
- Varon, Jeremy (2004). Bringing the War Home: The Weather Underground, the Red Army Faction, and Revolutionary Violence in the Sixties and Seventies. Berkeley and Los Angeles: University of California Press. ISBN 0-520-24119-3.
