= Naomi Jaffe =

American Marxist militant

- Born: Naomi Esther Jaffe; June 1943 (age 83); Glen Wild, New York, U.S
- Other names: Naomi Esther Safier; "Leona"
- Education: Brandeis University
- Occupation: Activist
- Known for: Former member of the 1970s group the Weather Underground Organization
- Children: 1

Naomi Esther Jaffe (born June 1943) is an American activist and feminist. She is former undergraduate student of Herbert Marcuse and member of the Weather Underground Organization. Jaffe was recently the Executive Director of Holding Our Own, a multiracial foundation for women.

== Early life ==
Jaffe was born in upstate New York on a small family farm run by her Jewish parents. Her father, Abe Jaffe (February 3, 1909 – October 11, 2003), was a poultry farmer and her mother, Sadie Bakst Jaffe (May 13, 1908 – January 15, 2005), was an elementary school teacher. Her brother, Bernard (1945–January 2, 2004), was a musician.

As a child, she was influenced by her Communist relatives. Their influence was reflected in her later revolutionary involvement. After high school, she went on to attend Brandeis University and studied Marxism in a few classes with the professor and political theorist Herbert Marcuse.

== Students for a Democratic Society ==
After receiving her undergraduate degree Jaffe founded a chapter of the Students for a Democratic Society at The New School for Social Research where she was pursuing her graduate degree in sociology. During graduate school, she formed a friendship with future Weatherman, David Gilbert. While in the SDS, Jaffe worked for the independent publication New Left Notes and published an article about equal rights for women called "The Look Is You" coauthored with Bernardine Dohrn. Jaffe, a known member of the group Women's International Terrorist Conspiracy from Hell (W.I.T.C.H.), participated in the 1969 demonstrations at the Miss America Pageant in Atlantic City. The demonstrations were held to speak out against the consumer driven oppression of women, and to say that the Miss America Pageant perpetuated false stereotypes about the capabilities of women. In 1969, as a member and leading feminist of the SDS, Jaffe traveled with a group of people to Hanoi to talk to Vietnamese students and others about the U.S. antiwar movement.

== Weathermen ==
In 1969, the SDS was heading in a more radical direction and Jaffe became one of the founding members of the Weatherman Organization, yet never became a leader. Jaffe joined the Weather Underground because the group believed in the self-determination of African American people; that they should have a revolution of their own without the total involvement of white middle class people. She also joined because the group was radically anti-racist and anti-imperialist. As quoted by historian Dan Berger, Jaffe says the Weather Underground was "the most vital show in town." The organization was also aligned with her Marxist ideals. To join she had to set aside her feminist convictions, yet she always believed that the WUO should have focused more on women's liberation.

In September 1969, she participated in "jailbreaks", actions in which high school students were encouraged to leave class and run through the halls as though they were being freed from the prison that was their school. This action was to gain support for the "Days of Rage" also called the National Action. She and 25 other Weatherwomen, including Cathy Wilkerson, were arrested in Pittsburgh, Pennsylvania, for that act. From October 8–11, 1969 Jaffe participated in the "Days of Rage" in Chicago where members of the WUO, after having taken control of the SDS, ran through the streets smashing windows and causing chaos, she was arrested on October 11 for battery and resisting arrest. In 1970, Jaffe was indicted in Detroit, Michigan, for her participation in the 1969 War Council held in Flint, Michigan, the final public meeting of the Weatherman-controlled SDS before the dissolution of the SDS in January 1970. 13 people were indicted on charges of conspiracy to commit bombings and murders, however, these charges were dropped in 1973.

=== Underground ===
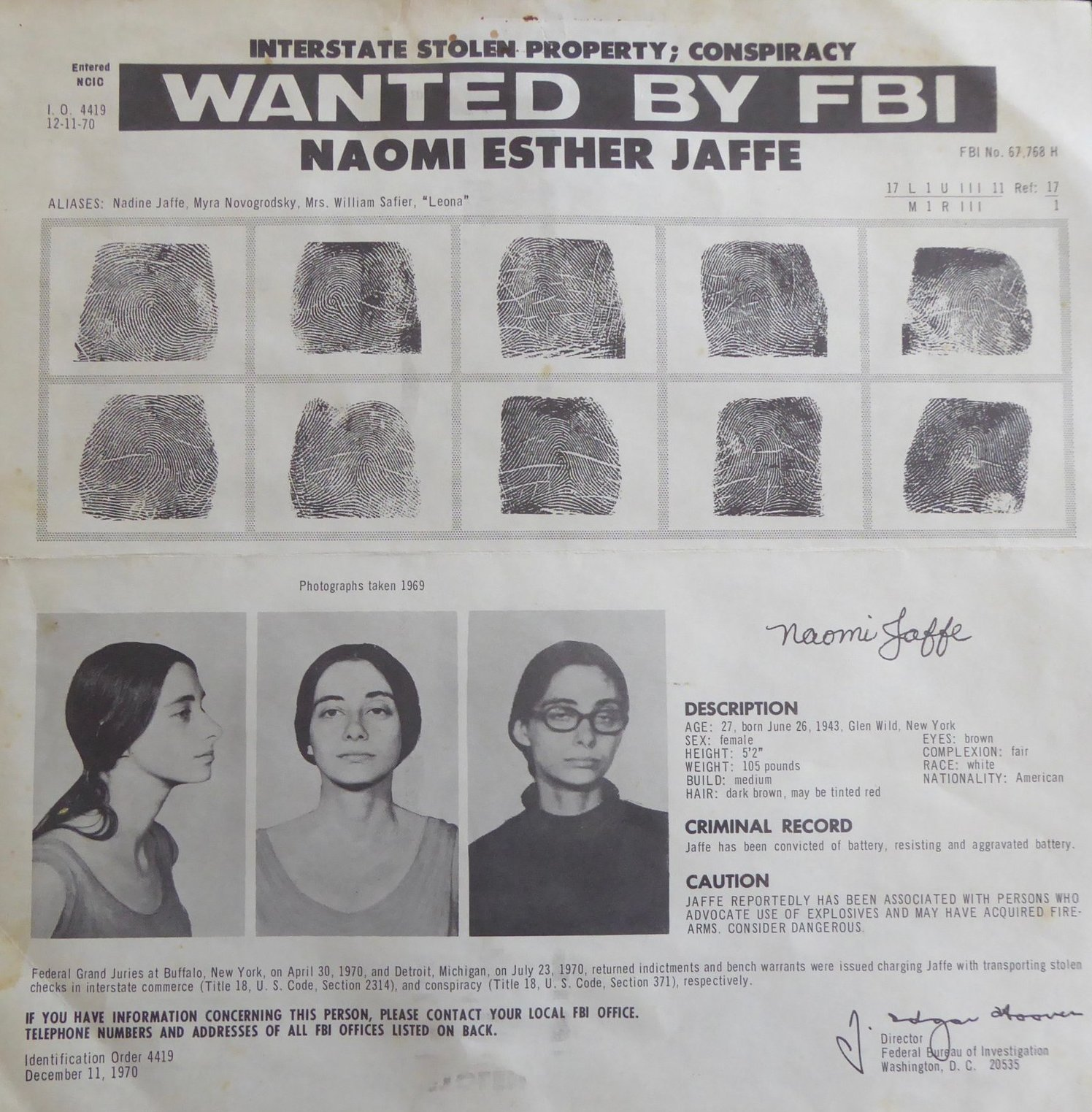
FBI flyer for Jaffe's arrest, issued December 1970

After the Greenwich Village townhouse explosion in March, 1970, Jaffe went underground. She found it necessary to cut her beloved long hair which she had been growing since childhood; she also cut ties with her tight-knit family because it was what she needed to do to become a revolutionary (or, simply, to elude capture by the FBI). Although her whereabouts from 1970 to 1978 are mostly unknown, in 1971 the FBI lifted her fingerprints from an abandoned apartment in San Francisco, California. Summaries of surveillance files indicate that the apartment had been rented by Weathermen from 1970 to 1971 and contained bomb making material; the FBI called the apartment a bomb factory. While underground Jaffe helped to design and publish Weather's short-lived publication, Osawatomie. Around 1975, while living on the East Coast, Jaffe expressed concerns about the direction the group was taking: because of her feminist background she most likely wanted them to refocus on women's issues, and this led to her becoming estranged from the group. She was living on her own and not in a collective, so when she showed up to a planned meeting and no one else showed, she realized she was out. Jaffe resurfaced in 1978. In an unpublished critique of Prairie Fire, written soon after Weather split up, Jaffe wrote harshly about the problems with the Weather Underground's lack of focus on feminist issues.

== Recent history ==
After she resurfaced, Jaffe spent a great deal of time reassessing her priorities as an activist. In the last 20 years, she has focused much of her attention on feminism, lesbian issues, and anti-racism in New York State. Today Jaffe is a mother of one son and lives in Albany, New York, with her life partner. Having continued a life of activism, Jaffe has worked on a local Free Mumia Committee and she is also the former Executive Director of the organization Holding Our Own, an anti-racist women's funding foundation. Jaffe was also prominently featured in the 2002 documentary film The Weather Underground.
