= Larry Grathwohl =

FBI informant

Larry David Grathwohl (October 13, 1947 – July 18, 2013) was a United States Army veteran who infiltrated the Weather Underground as an FBI informant. (Note: Grathwohl is sometimes described as the FBI's only informant inside the organization, but historian Arthur Eckstein writes that there was at least one other person during the same period.) He later testified before the Senate Internal Security Subcommittee and wrote a book about his experiences.

== Life and career ==
Grathwohl grew up in Cinncinnati, Ohio. During the Vietnam War, he served in the 2^{nd} Battalion, 502^{nd} Regiment, 101^{st} Airborne Division, from 1965 to 1966. This was a Hatchet Force unit, according to his obituary in The American Spectator. He became a sergeant and was awarded the Bronze Star. He served as a drill instructor at Fort Knox on his return to America.

In August 1969, while attending classes at the University of Cincinnati, he encountered members of Weatherman (then an aboveground organization) selling newspapers and started talking to them. Viewing the group as a threat, he began attending its meetings. After the Days of Rage, he contacted the Justice Department, who referred him to the FBI. Grathwohl was active as an informant between August 1969 and April 1970. He was initially paid $100 per week; the FBI increased his stipend after the Greenwich Village townhouse explosion in March 1970. That month he warned the FBI of bombs placed at the Detroit Police Officers Association which likely would have killed many if they had not been defused. Already under suspicion due to poorly explained absences and questions he had asked about the group's future plans, he was exposed as an informant when he was arrested with Linda Evans and Dianne Donghi on April 15, 1970. After the townhouse explosion, Grathwohl had taped a dog tag to the inside of his shoe so that he could be identified if he was killed. In view of Evans and Donghi, a US Marshal who didn't know that he was an informant found this dog tag and accused him of lying about his name before being quickly quieted by a colleague. In the summer of 1970, the Berkeley Tribe published an article naming him as an informant and "Wanted" posters depicting him circulated in the Berkeley area.

He testified before the Senate Internal Security Subcommittee about his experiences in 1974. In his Senate testimony, he described himself as "politically a liberal, moderate and conservative in other areas — law enforcement being one of my conservative areas." In 1976, he co-wrote a book about his experiences, Bringing Down America: An FBI Informer with the Weathermen. A contemporary review in The Boston Globe concluded: "Readable pulp, the Grathwohl tale is nonetheless an indispensable footnote to a continuing history." He was called as a defense witness when Mark Felt was put on trial for authorizing warrantless searches in 1980. That year, the Associated Press reported that he was working as a "private security agent in the San Francisco area." That same year, he appeared in a CBC documentary in which he alleged that Weather Underground members had been in regular contact with the Cuban intelligence service (the DGI). Grathwohl played a role in the Bill Ayers 2008 presidential election controversy, accusing Ayers and Bernardine Dohrn of being directly involved in the 1970 San Francisco Police Department Park Station bombing (a claim he had previously made in his 1974 Senate testimony); Ayers dismissed him as a "paid dishonest person." Grathwohl died in 2013, at the age of 65. Fellow informant and political commentator Brandon Darby eulogized him as “a tremendous friend and a valuable resource.”

== Personal life ==
Grathwohl was married and divorced, and had three children. In a 1976 interview, he attributed his divorce to his work as an informant.

== Books ==
- Grathwohl, Larry, and Reagan, Frank. Bringing Down America: An FBI Informer with the Weathermen. United States, Arlington House, 1976. ISBN 9780870003356
