= David Gilbert (activist) =

American activist (born 1944)

- Born: October 6, 1944 (age 81)
- Education: Columbia University
- Organization: Weather Underground
- Partner: Kathy Boudin
- Children: Chesa Boudin
- Status: Paroled
- Convictions: Second degree murder (3 counts); First degree robbery (4 counts)
- Penalty: 75 years to life in prison; commuted to 40 years to life in prison

David Gilbert (born October 6, 1944) is an American leftist who participated in the deadly 1981 robbery of a Brinks armored vehicle. Gilbert was a founder of the Columbia University chapter of Students for a Democratic Society and became a member of the Weather Underground. Gilbert, who served as the getaway driver in the robbery, was convicted under New York's felony murder law in the killing by co-defendants of two Nyack, New York police officers and a Brink's security guard. He was given a sentence of 75 years to life in prison.

Gilbert received a grant of clemency from Governor Andrew Cuomo on August 23, 2021, reducing his minimum term from 75 years to 40, thereby making him eligible for conditional release. He was granted parole on October 26, 2021, and released on November 4, 2021.

== Early life and education ==
Gilbert grew up in a Jewish family in Brookline, Massachusetts, a suburb of Boston. He was an Explorer Scout, and his father was Post Leader, of a South Brookline Explorer Post. Inspired in his teens by the Greensboro sit-ins and other events of the Civil Rights Movement, he joined the Congress of Racial Equality at age seventeen. He entered Columbia College of Columbia University in 1962. In March 1965, Gilbert founded the Independent Committee on Vietnam (ICV) at Columbia. Later, in the same year, he co-founded the Columbia chapter of Students for a Democratic Society (SDS) which merged with ICV in the Fall of 1966, even though there was already an SDS chapter established at Columbia, formed in the early 1960s. The SDS chapter founded by Gilbert became renowned.

He traveled regularly to Harlem while working as a tutor, and saw Malcolm X speak at Barnard College in February 1965, experiences he describes as formative. Gilbert was one of the attendees at the Flint War Council known to the FBI.

== Career ==
After graduating from Columbia University in June 1966, Gilbert spent most of his days and evenings during the fall of 1967 downtown, attending graduate school at the New School for Social Research, building an SDS chapter there, or attending meetings at the New York SDS Regional Office. In addition, Gilbert spent his spare time studying Karl Marx's Das Kapital and writing New Left theoretical papers on imperialism and U.S. domestic consumption, consumerism and "the new working-class". At Columbia, the SDS expanded during the Spring 1967 term. Gilbert returned to the Columbia campus to offer a "radical education counter-course" for Columbia SDS freshmen and sophomores in a lounge in Ferris Booth Hall.

Known by the late 1960s primarily as a young theorist, publishing articles in New Left Notes and other movement publications, he went on to play an organizing role in the April–May 1968 Columbia student strike. On April 4, 1968, Gilbert was arrested for the first time, after joining a disturbance where 6 officers were engaged in a physical altercation with a protester. Gilbert's charge was assaulting a police officer. Gilbert maintained that the officer scraped his hand when he tried to hit Gilbert in the head with his baton. His lawyer advised him to take a plea bargain, and Gilbert pleaded guilty to disorderly conduct and was fined $50.

During the Columbia strike, which began on April 23, 1968, Gilbert served as part of the strike team. Having good relations with some of the faculty, he was called on to be a negotiator. At the time of the strike he was still a graduate student at the New School for Social Research. In October 1969, he headed a Weather Underground collective in Denver and was arrested twice. The first arrest occurred while he was passing out leaflets in front of a community college and his comrades were inside setting off a smoke bomb. The second arrest led to a charge of "assault with a deadly weapon" after arresting officers found a rock in his pocket.

=== Weather Underground ===
In 1969, SDS split into different ideological factions and the Weathermen emerged, its purpose being to promote armed struggle among young white Americans in support of the Black Panthers and other militant groups, and also to oppose the war in Vietnam by means of activities intended to "Bring the War Home". Gilbert joined this group in 1969 with his friend Ted Gold, who died in the March 1970 Greenwich Village townhouse explosion, along with fellow Weather members Diana Oughton and Terry Robbins. The group became clandestine, and the organization was renamed the Weather Underground. When Weather went underground, members often used money they already had or which they received from their family to fund their efforts. Gilbert cashed in his Israel bonds and half of that money went to supporting Weather and the other half was put into the Black Panther bail fund.

Gilbert joined the Bay Area collective, living in a San Francisco apartment. He and another member were working on one of the group's cars in spring of 1971 when they were approached by two men in suits claiming to be real-estate agents. The men asked a few questions and then left. Gilbert suspected that these men were actually FBI agents looking for information. After several group meetings, they decided to reduce their radical activities for a while.

As support for the group began to wane, the pace of their activities slowed, and some members of the Weather Underground resurfaced in late 1976 and early 1977. Gilbert resurfaced briefly in Denver, Colorado, between 1977 and 1979. He had helped organize a Weather collective there in October 1969. Before surfacing, he managed to get his criminal charges dropped, so he did not face any potential legal penalties. Gilbert, however, did not believe it was in the best interests of the movement for him to resurface. Most Weather members were not prosecuted and did not serve time in prison, despite having been sought by the police for years; police misconduct led to the dropping of many charges (see: COINTELPRO). Still, Gilbert opted to continue his life underground. Gilbert and his then-partner, Kathy Boudin, remained active in the Weather Underground, even following the birth of their son, Chesa Boudin, in August 1980.

==== Brink's robbery ====
In the late 1970s or early 1980s Gilbert and other white activists joined the RATF (Revolutionary Armed Task Force), an alliance of white revolutionaries with, and under the leadership of, the RATF unit of the Black Liberation Army (BLA). On October 20, 1981, the RATF and related May 19th Communist Organization participated, along with several members of the BLA, in an armed robbery of a Brink's armored car at the Nanuet Mall, near Nyack, New York.

While Gilbert and Boudin acted as the getaway vehicle driver and lookout in a waiting U-Haul truck in a nearby parking lot, armed BLA members took another vehicle to the mall, where a Brink's truck was making a delivery. They confronted the guards, and a shootout ensued, wounding guard Joe Trombino after he fired one shot, and killing his co-worker, Peter Paige. The robbers then took $1.6 million in cash and raced to transfer this into the waiting U-Haul. The truck was soon stopped by a police roadblock.

Two police officers, Waverly L. Brown and Edward J. O'Grady, were killed in the shootout. Gilbert fled the area with other RATF and BLA members but was caught by police that day.

He was convicted of murder and robbery in 1983 and sentenced to 75 years to life in prison.

=== Imprisonment ===
While confined at the maximum security Auburn Correctional Facility in Cayuga County, New York during the early years of his sentence, Gilbert in 1987 co-founded an inmate peer education program on HIV and AIDS, and a similar, more successful project in Great Meadows Prison in Comstock following his transfer to the eastern part of the state.

Gilbert served his sentence in various New York prisons, being last incarcerated at the Shawangunk Correctional Facility, just outside Wallkill, New York.

=== Commutation of sentence ===
On August 23, 2021, his last day in office, Governor Andrew Cuomo granted Gilbert clemency in the form of a partial sentence commutation. The commutation of Gilbert's minimum sentence from 75 years to the 40 years he served by October 2021 did not constitute a pardon or reduce the sentence to time served but did make Gilbert eligible to appear before the state's parole board. The board announced on October 26, 2021, that it had granted Gilbert parole, effective in November 2021. Gilbert was released on November 4, 2021.

== Writings ==
David Gilbert co-wrote the pamphlet U.S. Imperialism with David Loud. The pamphlet was used across the country as a study guide by SDSers. Gilbert co-wrote an article entitled "Praxis and the New Left". It appeared in the first issue of Praxis on February 13, 1967. The article, co-written with Bob Gottlieb and Gerry Tenney, was part of a longer position paper called the "Port Authority Statement".

Gilbert was one of a small group that edited and rewrote Bill Ayers' initial draft of Prairie Fire. Explaining the book's purpose, Gilbert said, "We needed something to re-mobilize us, we needed to have an organization to fight imperialism."

In 2004, Gilbert published a collection of essays, No Surrender. Gilbert's political memoir, Love And Struggle: My Life in SDS, the Weather Underground and Beyond was published in 2012 by PM Press.

== Personal life ==
Gilbert had a son with fellow Weather Underground member Kathy Boudin, in New York City in 1980. After Gilbert and Boudin were arrested for the Brink's robbery, their 14-month-old son, Chesa Boudin, was raised in Chicago by adoptive parents Bill Ayers and Bernardine Dohrn, who, like his parents, had been members of the Weather Underground. Chesa Boudin grew up to be a Rhodes Scholar, Yale Law School graduate, and, from 2019 to 2022, District Attorney of San Francisco.

== Books ==
- No Surrender: Writings from an Anti-Imperialist Political Prisoner. Abraham Guillen Press, 2004. ISBN 9781894925266
- Love and Struggle: My Life in SDS, the Weather Underground, and Beyond. PM Press, 2012. ISBN 9781604863192

== See also ==
- List of Weatherman actions
