= Weather Underground =

American left-wing militant organization (1969–1977)

- Logo of the Weather Underground
- Leaders: Bill Ayers; Bernardine Dohrn
- Dates active: 1969–1977
- Split from: Students for a Democratic Society
- Groups: Seattle Weather Collective; Women's Brigade
- Active regions: United States
- Ideology: Communism; Black power; Black nationalism; Anti-capitalism; Anti-imperialism; New Left; Anti-Vietnam War
- Political position: Left-wing
- Part of: the Anti-Vietnam War, Black Power, and New Communist movements

The Weather Underground was an American Marxist militant organization active from 1969 until 1977. Originally known as the Weathermen, or simply Weatherman, the group originated as a faction of the national leadership of Students for a Democratic Society (SDS). The group adopted the name Weather Underground Organization (WUO) in 1970. Its members advocated revolutionary struggle against the United States government and described their politics as anti-imperialist and anti-racist. The group's ideology was influenced by Black Power and the anti-war movement. The Federal Bureau of Investigation (FBI) regarded the WUO as a domestic terrorist group.

The Weather Underground took its name from Bob Dylan's lyric "You don't need a weatherman to know which way the wind blows", from the song "Subterranean Homesick Blues" (1965). They took this line as the title of a position paper distributed at the SDS convention in Chicago on June 18, 1969. This founding document called for a "White fighting force" to be allied with the "Black Liberation Movement" and other radical movements to achieve "the destruction of U.S. imperialism and form a classless communist world". The "Days of Rage", a riot orchestrated by the WUO in October 1969 in Chicago, was timed to coincide with the trial of the Chicago Seven. In 1970 the group issued a "Declaration of a State of War" against the U.S. government under the name "Weather Underground Organization". That year the WUO took part in Timothy Leary's escape from prison.

In the 1970s, the WUO conducted a bombing campaign targeting government buildings and banks. Some attacks were preceded by evacuation warnings, along with threats identifying the particular issue that the attack was intended to protest. Three members of the WUO were killed in an accidental explosion in New York City's Greenwich Village in 1970, but no one was killed in any of the bombings claimed by the group. (Note: Several people were injured, one seriously, in a 1970 bombing of a Berkeley police station that was carried out by WUO members but not claimed at the time. The WUO has also been accused of carrying out the 1970 San Francisco Police Department Park Station bombing, in which one person was killed, but this has never been proven.) WUO targets included the Marin County Civic Center (1970), the United States Capitol (1971), and the Pentagon (1972).

The WUO began to disintegrate after the U.S. reached a peace accord with Vietnam in 1973, and was defunct by 1977. Some members of the group joined the May 19th Communist Organization (M19CO) and continued their activities until that group disbanded in 1985. Due to misconduct by the FBI, Weatherman's leadership was largely able to resume normal lives after the group dissolved, without being prosecuted or serving jail time. Some members of M19CO who were involved in the 1981 Brink's robbery, in which three people were killed, served lengthy prison sentences.

== Background and formation ==
The Weather Underground emerged from campus-based opposition to United States involvement in the Vietnam War as well as the civil rights movement of the 1960s, particularly from Students for a Democratic Society (SDS), one of the leading organizations in the New Left. Following factional divisions within the SDS in 1969, the Weather Underground Organization emerged as a far-left militant organization.

One of the factors that contributed to the radicalization of SDS members was the Economic Research and Action Project, which the group undertook in urban neighborhoods in the Northeastern United States between 1963 and 1968. This project was aimed at creating an interracial movement of impoverished Americans that would mobilize for full and fair employment or guaranteed annual income and political rights. The group's goal was to create a more democratic society "which guarantees political freedom, economic and physical security, abundant education, and incentives for wide cultural variety". While the initial phase of SDS activity involved campus organizing, phase two involved community organizing. These experiences led some SDS members to conclude that deep social change would not happen through community organizing and electoral politics, and that more radical and disruptive tactics were needed.

In the late 1960s, United States military action in Southeast Asia escalated. In the U.S., anti-war sentiment was particularly pronounced during the 1968 presidential election. Around this time, SDS began to fragment and collapse following a split between the group's leadership in the "National Office", the Progressive Labor Party (PLP) and their respective supporters. During the factional struggle, National Office leaders such as Bernardine Dohrn and Mike Klonsky began announcing their emerging perspectives, and Klonsky published a manifesto titled "Toward a Revolutionary Youth Movement" (RYM).

RYM promoted the philosophy that young workers possessed the potential to be a revolutionary force which could overthrow capitalism, if not by themselves then by transmitting radical ideas to the working class. Klonsky's document reflected the philosophy of the National Office and was eventually adopted as SDS's official doctrine. During the summer of 1969, however, the National Office itself began to split. One group, led by Klonsky, became known as RYM II; the other group, RYM I, was led by Dohrn and endorsed more aggressive tactics such as direct action, as some members felt that years of nonviolent resistance had done little or nothing to stop the war. The Weathermen strongly sympathized with the radical Black Panther Party; the police killing of Panther Fred Hampton prompted the Weathermen to issue a declaration of war upon the U.S. government.

We petitioned, we demonstrated, we sat in. I was willing to get hit over the head, I did; I was willing to go to prison, I did. To me, it was a question of what had to be done to stop the much greater violence that was going on.

— David Gilbert

=== SDS Convention, June 1969 ===
At an SDS convention in Chicago on June 18, 1969, the National Office attempted to persuade unaffiliated delegates not to endorse a takeover by the PLP, who had packed the convention with their supporters. The PLP was an anti-revisionist Marxist-Leninist group that had turned to SDS to recruit new members after meeting with little success in organizing industrial workers, their preferred base. SDS members of that time were nearly all anti-communist but refused to be drawn into actions that could be perceived as red-baiting, which they viewed as mostly irrelevant and out of date. The PLP soon began to organize a Worker Student Alliance. By the late 1960s the group would profoundly affect SDS, particularly at national gatherings of the membership, forming a well-groomed, disciplined faction which followed the PLP line. At the beginning of the June 1969 convention, two position papers were passed out by the National Office leadership, one a revised statement of Klonsky's manifesto, the other called "You Don't Need a Weatherman to Know Which Way the Wind Blows".

The latter document outlined the position of the group that would become the Weather Underground. It had been signed by Dohrn, Karen Ashley, Bill Ayers, John Jacobs, Jeff Jones, Gerry Long, Howie Machtinger, Jim Mellen, Terry Robbins, Mark Rudd and Steve Tappis. The document called for creating a clandestine revolutionary party:

The most important task for us toward making the revolution, and the work our collectives should engage in, is the creation of a mass revolutionary movement, without which a clandestine revolutionary party will be impossible. A revolutionary mass movement is different from the traditional revisionist mass base of "sympathizers". Rather it is akin to the Red Guard in China, based on the full participation and involvement of masses of people in the practice of making revolution; a movement with a full willingness to participate in the violent and illegal struggle.

At the June 1969 convention, the Weathermen faction planned for October 8–11 as a "National Action" built around Jacobs' slogan, "bring the war home". The National Action grew out of a resolution drafted by Jacobs and introduced at the October 1968 SDS National Council meeting in Boulder, Colorado. The resolution, titled "The Elections Don't Mean Shit—Vote Where the Power Is—Our Power Is In The Street" and adopted by the council, was prompted by the perceived success of the protests at the 1968 Democratic National Convention and reflected Jacobs' strong advocacy of direct action.

As part of the "National Action Staff", Jacobs was an integral part of the planning for what quickly came to be called "Four Days of Rage". For Jacobs, the goal of the "Days of Rage" was clear:

Weatherman would shove the war down their dumb, fascist throats and show them, while we were at it, how much better we were than them, both tactically and strategically, as a people. In an all-out civil war over Vietnam and other fascist U.S. imperialism, we were going to bring the war home. 'Turn the imperialists' war into a civil war', in Lenin's words. And we were going to kick ass.

In July 1969, thirty members of Weathermen leadership traveled to Cuba and met with North Vietnamese representatives to gain from their revolutionary experience. According to the Senate Internal Security Committee, the North Vietnamese requested armed political action in order to stop the U.S. government's war in Vietnam. Subsequently, the group accepted funding, training, recommendations on tactics and slogans from Cuba, and perhaps explosives as well.

=== Flint War Council, December 1969 ===
After the Days of Rage, the Weathermen held the last of its National Council meetings from December 26–31, 1969, in Flint, Michigan. The meeting, dubbed the "War Council" by the 300 people who attended, adopted Jacobs' call for violent revolution. Dohrn opened the conference by telling the delegates they needed to stop being afraid and begin the "armed struggle". Over the next five days, the participants met in informal groups to discuss what "going underground" meant, how best to organize collectives, and justifications for violence. In the evening, the groups reconvened for a mass "wargasm"—practicing karate, engaging in physical exercise, singing songs and listening to speeches.

The War Council ended with a major speech by Jacobs, who condemned the "pacifism" of white middle-class American youth, a belief which he claimed they held because they were insulated from the violence which afflicted blacks and the poor. He declared that youth were moving away from passivity and apathy and toward a new high-energy culture of "depersonalization" brought about by drugs, sex and armed revolution. "We're against everything that's 'good and decent' in honky America," Jacobs said in his most commonly quoted statement. "We will burn and loot and destroy. We are the incubation of your mother's nightmare."

Two major decisions came out of the War Council. The first was to go underground and to begin a violent, armed struggle against the state without attempting to organize or mobilize a broad swath of the public. The Weathermen hoped to create underground collectives in major cities throughout the country. Ultimately, the group created only three significant, active collectives: one in California, one in the Midwest, and one in New York City. The New York City collective was led by Jacobs and Terry Robbins, and included Ted Gold, Kathy Boudin, Cathy Wilkerson (Robbins's girlfriend) and Diana Oughton. Jacobs was one of Robbins' biggest supporters and pushed the Weathermen's national leadership to allow Robbins to be as violent as he wanted to be. The Weathermen leadership agreed, as did the New York City collective. The collective's first target was Judge John Murtagh, who was overseeing the trial of the "Panther 21".

The second major decision was the dissolution of the SDS. After the group's fragmentation in the summer of 1969, the Weathermen's adherents explicitly claimed themselves to be the true leadership of the organization and retained control of the National Office. Thereafter, any leaflet, label or logo bearing the name "Students for a Democratic Society" (SDS) was in fact the views and politics of the Weathermen, not of the slate elected by the PLP. The Weathermen contained the vast majority of former SDS National Committee members, including Dohrn, Mark Rudd, David Gilbert and Vernon T. Grizzard. The group, while small, was able to commandeer the mantle of SDS and all of its membership lists, but with the Weathermen in charge there was little or no support from local branches or members of the old organization, and local chapters soon disbanded. At the War Council, the Weathermen had decided to close the SDS National Office, ending an organization which at its peak included 100,000 members just a few years earlier.

=== Ideology ===
The thesis of Weatherman theory, as expounded in its founding document, "You Don't Need a Weatherman to Know Which Way the Wind Blows", was that "the main struggle going on in the world today is between U.S. imperialism and the national liberation struggles against it", based on Vladimir Lenin's theory of imperialism, first expounded in Imperialism, the Highest Stage of Capitalism (1916). In Weatherman theory "oppressed peoples" are the creators of the wealth of empire, and "the goal of revolutionary struggle must be the control and use of this wealth in the interest of the oppressed peoples of the world" in the service of establishing "world communism".

Vietnam and other third world countries, as well as third world people within the United States, were to play a vanguard role. They "set the terms for class struggle in America ...". The role of the "Revolutionary Youth Movement" was to build a centralized organization of revolutionaries, a "Marxist–Leninist Party" supported by a mass revolutionary movement to support international liberation movements and "open another battlefield of the revolution."

The theoretical basis of the Revolutionary Youth Movement was a belief that most of the American population, including both students and the supposed "middle class", comprised, due to their relationship to the instruments of production, the working class. Thus the organizational basis of SDS, which had begun in elite colleges and had been extended to public institutions as the organization grew, could be extended to youth as a whole including students, those serving in the military, and the unemployed. Students could be viewed as workers gaining skills prior to employment. This contrasted to the Progressive Labor view which viewed students and workers as being in separate categories which could ally, but should not jointly organize.

FBI analysis of the travel history of the founders and initial followers of the organization emphasized contacts with foreign governments, particularly the Cuban and North Vietnamese and their influence on the ideology of the organization. Participation in the Venceremos Brigade, a program which involved U.S. students volunteering to work in the sugar harvest in Cuba, is highlighted as a common factor in the background of the founders of the Weather Underground, with China a secondary influence. This experience was cited by both Kathy Boudin and Bernardine Dohrn as a major influence on their political development.

Terry Robbins took the organization's name from the lyrics of the Bob Dylan song "Subterranean Homesick Blues", which featured the lyrics "You don't need a weatherman to know which way the wind blows." The lyrics had been quoted at the bottom of an influential essay in the SDS newspaper, New Left Notes. By using this title the Weathermen meant, partially, to appeal to the segment of U.S. youth inspired to action for social justice by Dylan's songs.

The Weatherman group had long held that militancy was becoming more important than nonviolent forms of anti-war action, and that campus-based demonstrations needed to be punctuated with more dramatic actions which had the potential to interfere with the U.S. military and internal security apparatus. The belief was that these types of urban guerrilla actions would act as a catalyst for the coming revolution. Many international events indeed seemed to support the Weathermen's overall assertion that worldwide revolution was imminent, such as the tumultuous Cultural Revolution in China; the 1968 student revolts in France, Mexico City and elsewhere; the Prague Spring; the Northern Ireland civil rights movement; the emergence of the Tupamaros organization in Uruguay; the emergence of the Guinea-Bissauan Revolution and similar Marxist-led independence movements throughout Africa; and within the U.S., the rise of the Black Panther Party, together with a series of "ghetto rebellions" throughout poor black neighborhoods across the country.

We felt that doing nothing in a period of repressive violence is itself a form of violence. That's really the part that I think is the hardest for people to understand. If you sit in your house, live your white life and go to your white job, and allow the country that you live in to murder people and to commit genocide, and you sit there and you don't do anything about it, that's violence.

— Naomi Jaffe

The Weathermen were outspoken critics of what later came to be known as "white privilege" (described as white-skin privilege). As the civil disorder in poor black neighborhoods intensified in the early 1970s, Dohrn said, "White youth must choose sides now. They must either fight on the side of the oppressed or be on the side of the oppressor."

=== Anti-imperialism, anti-racism, and white privilege ===
Weatherman maintained that their stance differed from the rest of the movements at the time in the sense that they predicated their critiques on the notion that they were engaged in "an anti-imperialist, anti-racist struggle". Weatherman put the international proletariat at the center of their political theory. They warned that other political theories, including those addressing class interests or youth interests, were "bound to lead in a racist and chauvinist direction". Weatherman denounced other political theories of the time as "objectively racist" if they did not side with the international proletariat; such political theories, they argued, needed to be "smashed".

Weathermen further contended that efforts at "organizing whites against their own perceived oppression" were "attempts by whites to carve out even more privilege than they already derive from the imperialist nexus". Weatherman's political theory sought to make every struggle an anti-imperialist, anti-racist struggle; out of this premise came their interrogation of critical concepts that would later be known as "white privilege". As historian Dan Berger writes, Weatherman raised the question "what does it mean to be a white person opposing racism and imperialism?"

At one point, the Weathermen adopted the belief that all white babies were "tainted with the original sin of 'skin privilege', declaring "all white babies are pigs" with one Weatherwoman telling feminist poet Robin Morgan "You have no right to that pig male baby" after she saw Morgan breastfeeding her son. Charles Manson was an obsession within the group. Dohrn claimed that he truly understood the iniquity of white America, with the Manson family being praised for the murder of Sharon Tate; Dohrn's cell subsequently made its salute a four-fingered gesture that represented the fork used to stab Tate.

=== Practice ===
Shortly after its formation as an independent group, Weatherman created a central committee, the Weather Bureau, which assigned its cadres to collectives in major cities. These cities included New York, Boston, Seattle, Philadelphia, Cincinnati, Buffalo, and Chicago, the home of the SDS's head office. The collectives set up under the Weather Bureau drew their design from Che Guevara's foco theory, which focused on the building of small, semi-autonomous cells guided by a central leadership.

To try to turn their members into hardened revolutionaries and to promote solidarity and cohesion, members of collectives engaged in intensive criticism sessions which attempted to reconcile their prior and current activities to Weathermen doctrine. These "criticism self-criticism" sessions (also called "CSC" or "Weatherfries") were the most distressing part of life in the collective. Derived from Maoist techniques, the sessions were intended to root out racist, individualist and chauvinist tendencies among group members. At its most intense, members would be berated for a dozen or more hours non-stop about their flaws. It was intended to make group members believe that they were, deep down, white supremacists by subjecting them to constant criticism to break them down. The sessions were used to ridicule and bully those who didn't agree with the party line and force them into acceptance. However, the sessions were also almost entirely successful at purging potential informants from the Weathermen's ranks, making them crucial to the Weathermen's survival as an underground organization. The Weathermen were also determined to destroy "bourgeois individualism" amongst members that would potentially interfere with their commitment to both the Weathermen and the goal of revolution. Personal property was either renounced or given to the collective, with income being used to purchase the needs of the group and members enduring spartan living conditions. Conventional comforts were forbidden, and the leadership was exalted, giving them immense power over their subordinates (in some collectives the leadership could even dictate personal decisions such as where one went). Martial arts were practiced and occasional direct actions were engaged in. Critical of monogamy, they launched a "smash monogamy" campaign, in which couples (whose affection was deemed unacceptably possessive, counterrevolutionary or even selfish) were to be split apart; collectives underwent forced rotation of sex partners (including allegations that some male leaders rotated women between collectives in order to sleep with them) and in some cases engaged in sexual orgies. This formation continued during 1969 and 1970 until the group went underground and a more relaxed lifestyle was adopted as the group blended into the counterculture.

Life in the collectives could be particularly hard for women, who made up about half the members. Their political awakening had included a growing awareness of sexism, yet they often found that men took the lead in political activities and discussion, with women often engaging in domestic work, as well as finding themselves confined to second-tier leadership roles. Certain feminist political beliefs had to be disavowed or muted and the women had to prove, regardless of prior activist credentials, that they were as capable as men in engaging in political action as part of "women's cadres", which were felt to be driven by coerced machismo and failed to promote genuine solidarity amongst the women. While the Weathermen's sexual politics did allow women to assert desire and explore relationships with each other, it also made them vulnerable to sexual exploitation.

=== Recruitment ===
Weatherman used various means by which to recruit new members. Weather Underground members aimed to mobilize people into action against the established leaders of the nation and the patterns of injustice which existed in America and abroad due to America's presence overseas. They also aimed to convince people to resist reliance upon their given privilege and to rebel and take arms if necessary. According to Weatherman, if people tolerated the unjust actions of the state, they became complicit in those actions. In the manifesto compiled by Ayers, Dohrn, Jones, and Celia Sojourn, entitled "Prairie Fire: The Politics of Revolutionary Anti-Imperialism," Weatherman explained that their intention was to encourage the people and provoke leaps in confidence and consciousness in an attempt to stir the imagination, organize the masses, and join in the people's day-to-day struggles in every way possible.

In the year 1960, over a third of America's population was under 18 years of age. The number of young citizens set the stage for a widespread revolt against perceived structures of racism, sexism, and classism, the violence of the Vietnam War and America's interventions abroad. At college campuses throughout the country, anger against "the Establishment's" practices prompted both peaceful and violent protest. The members of Weatherman targeted high school and college students, assuming they would be willing to rebel against the authoritative figures who had oppressed them, including cops, principals, and bosses. Weatherman aimed to develop roots within the class struggle, targeting white working-class youths. The younger members of the working class became the focus of the organizing effort because they were thought to feel the oppression strongly in regard to the military draft, low-wage jobs, and schooling.

Schools became a scene of recruitment for the movement. In direct actions, dubbed Jailbreaks, Weatherman members invaded educational institutions as a means by which to recruit high school and college students. The motivation for these actions was the organization's belief that school was where the youth were oppressed by the system and where they learned to tolerate society's faults instead of rising against them. According to "Prairie Fire", young people are channeled, coerced, misled, miseducated, misused in the school setting. It is in schools that the youth of the nation become alienated from the authentic processes of learning about the world.

Berger explains the controversy surrounding recruitment strategies saying, "As an organizing strategy it was less than successful: white working class youths were more alienated than organized by Weather's spectacles, and even some of those interested in the group were turned off by its early hi-jinks."

==== Armed propaganda ====
Dan Berger writes that following their initial set of bombings, the organization adopted a new paradigm of direct action set forth in the communiqué New Morning, Changing Weather, which abjured attacks on people. The shift in the organization's outlook was in good part due to the 1970 deaths of Weathermen Terry Robbins, Diana Oughton and Ted Gold in the Greenwich Village townhouse explosion.

According to Berger, a relatively sophisticated program of armed propaganda was adopted. This consisted of a series of bombings of government and corporate targets in retaliation for specific imperialist and oppressive acts. Small, well-constructed time bombs were used, generally in vents in restrooms, which exploded at times the spaces were empty. Timely warnings were made, and communiqués issued explaining the reason for the actions.

== Major activities ==
=== Haymarket Police Memorial bombing ===
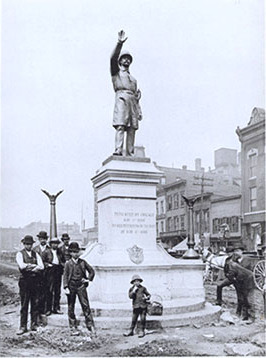
The Haymarket Square police memorial, seen in 1889

Shortly before the Days of Rage demonstrations on October 6, 1969, the Weathermen planted a bomb which blew up a statue in Chicago commemorating the deaths of police officers during the 1886 Haymarket Riot. The blast broke nearly 100 windows and scattered pieces of the statue onto the Kennedy Expressway below. The city rebuilt the statue and unveiled it on May 4, 1970, but the Weathermen blew it up again on October 6, 1970. The city rebuilt the statue once again, and Mayor Richard J. Daley posted a 24-hour police guard to protect it, but the Weathermen destroyed the third one, as well. The city compromised and rebuilt the monument once more, but this time they located it at Chicago Police Headquarters.

=== "Days of Rage" ===
One of the first acts of the Weathermen after splitting from SDS was to announce they would hold the "Days of Rage" that autumn. This was advertised to "Bring the war home!" Hoping to cause sufficient chaos to "wake" the American public out of what they saw as complacency toward the role of the U.S. in the Vietnam War, the Weathermen meant it to be the largest protest of the decade. They had been told by their regional cadre to expect thousands to attend; however, when they arrived, they found only a few hundred people.

According to Ayers in 2003, "The Days of Rage was an attempt to break from the norms of kind of acceptable theatre of 'here are the anti-war people: containable, marginal, predictable, and here's the little path they're going to march down, and here's where they can make their little statement.' We wanted to say, "No, what we're going to do is whatever we had to do to stop the violence in Vietnam.'" The protests did not meet Ayers' stated expectations.

Though the October 8, 1969, rally in Chicago had failed to draw as many as the Weathermen had anticipated, the two or three hundred who did attend shocked police by rioting through the affluent Gold Coast neighborhood. They smashed the windows of a bank and those of many cars. The crowd ran four blocks before encountering police barricades. They charged the police but broke into small groups; more than 1,000 police counter attacked. Many protesters were wearing motorcycle or football helmets, but the police were well trained and armed. Large amounts of tear gas were used, and at least twice police ran squad cars into the mob. The rioting lasted about half an hour, during which 28 policemen were injured. Six Weathermen were shot by the police and an unknown number injured; 68 rioters were arrested.

For the next two days, the Weathermen held no rallies or protests. Supporters of the RYM II movement, led by Klonsky and Noel Ignatin, held peaceful rallies in front of the federal courthouse, an International Harvester factory, and Cook County Hospital. The largest event of the Days of Rage took place on Friday, October 9, when RYM II led an interracial march of 2,000 people through a Spanish-speaking part of Chicago.

On October 10, the Weathermen attempted to regroup and resume their demonstrations. About 300 protesters marched through The Loop, Chicago's main business district, watched by a double line of heavily armed police. The protesters suddenly broke through the police lines and rampaged through the Loop, smashing the windows of cars and stores. The police were prepared, and quickly isolated the rioters. Within 15 minutes, more than half the crowd had been arrested.

The Days of Rage cost Chicago and the state of Illinois about $183,000 ($100,000 for National Guard expenses, $35,000 in damages, and $20,000 for one injured citizen's medical expenses). Most of the Weathermen and SDS leaders were now in jail, and the Weathermen would have to pay over $243,000 for their bail. Chicago Black Panthers leader Fred Hampton dismissed the Days of Rage as "anarchistic, opportunistic, individualistic, chauvinistic, custeristic".

=== Flint War Council ===
The Flint War Council was a series of meetings of the Weather Underground Organization and associates in Flint, Michigan, that took place 27–31 December 1969. During these meetings, the decisions were made for the Weather Underground Organization to go underground and to "engage in guerilla warfare against the U.S. government." This decision was made in response to increased pressure from law enforcement, and a belief that underground guerilla warfare was the best way to combat the U.S. government.

=== New York City arson attacks ===
On February 21, 1970, at around 4:30 a.m., three gasoline-filled Molotov cocktails exploded in front of the home of New York Supreme Court Justice John M. Murtagh, who was presiding over the pretrial hearings of the so-called "Panther 21" members of the Black Panther Party over a plot to bomb New York landmarks and department stores. Justice Murtagh and his family were unharmed, but two panes of a front window were shattered, an overhanging wooden eave was scorched, and the paint on a car in the garage was charred. "Free the Panther 21" and "Viet Cong have won" were written in large red letters on the sidewalk in front of the judge's house at 529 W. 217th Street in the Inwood neighborhood of Manhattan. The judge's house had been under hourly police surveillance and an unidentified woman called the police a few minutes before the explosions to report several prowlers there, which resulted in a police car being sent immediately to the scene.

In the preceding hours, Molotov cocktails had been thrown at the second floor of Columbia University's International Law Library at 434 W. 116th Street, at a police car parked across the street from the Charles Street police station in the West Village in Manhattan, and at Army and Navy recruiting booths on Nostrand Avenue on the eastern fringe of the Brooklyn College campus in Brooklyn, causing no or minimal damage in incidents of unknown relation to that at Judge Murtagh's home.

According to the December 6, 1970, "New Morning—Changing Weather" Weather Underground communiqué signed by Dohrn, and Wilkerson's 2007 memoir, the fire-bombing of Judge Murtagh's home, in solidarity with the Panther 21, was carried out by four members of the New York cell that was devastated two weeks later by the March 6, 1970, townhouse explosion.

=== Greenwich Village townhouse explosion ===
Weather Underground members Diana Oughton, Ted Gold, Terry Robbins, Wilkerson, and Kathy Boudin were making bombs in a Greenwich Village townhouse on March 6, 1970, when one of the bombs detonated. Oughton, Gold, and Robbins were killed; Wilkerson and Boudin escaped unharmed.

These bombs were made to target a Non-Commissioned Officer (NCO) dance at Fort Dix, as well as Butler Library at Columbia University. An FBI report stated that they had enough explosives to "level ... both sides of the street". Weather Underground leadership members Bill Ayers, Bernardine Dohrn, and Jeff Jones claimed the planned bombings of the Fort Dix NCO dance and Columbia University building were a rogue operation led by more extreme Greenwich Village townhouse residents, Ayers singling out Terry Robbins. However, later researchers concluded Weather Underground leaders planned and approved the bombings of an NCO dance, a Columbia University building, and several bombings in Detroit which were defused by the Detroit Police aided by informant Larry Grathwohl.

==== Underground strategy change ====
After the Greenwich Village townhouse explosion, per the December 1969 Flint War Council decisions the group was now well underground, and began to refer to themselves as the Weather Underground Organization. At this juncture, WUO shrank considerably, becoming even fewer than they had been when first formed. The group was devastated by the loss of their friends, and in late April 1970, members of the Weathermen met in California to discuss what had happened in New York and the future of the organization.

In 2003 Weather Underground members stated in interviews that they had wanted to convince the American public that the United States was truly responsible for the calamity in Vietnam. The group began striking at night, bombing empty offices, with warnings always issued in advance to ensure a safe evacuation. According to David Gilbert, (later jailed for his part in the 1981 Brink's robbery, in which three people were killed), "[their] goal was to not hurt any people, and a lot of work went into that. But we wanted to pick targets that showed to the public who was responsible for what was really going on."

We were very careful from the moment of the townhouse on to be sure we weren't going to hurt anybody, and we never did hurt anybody. Whenever we put a bomb in a public space, we had figured out all kinds of ways to put checks and balances on the thing and also to get people away from it, and we were remarkably successful.

— Bill Ayers, 2003

=== Declaration of war ===
In response to the deaths of Black Panther members Fred Hampton and Mark Clark in December 1969 during a police raid, and the Kent State Shootings 5 months later, on May 21, 1970, the Weather Underground issued a "Declaration of War" against the United States government, using for the first time its new name, the "Weather Underground Organization" (WUO), adopting fake identities, and pursuing covert activities only.

We've known that our job is to lead white kids into armed revolution. We never intended to spend the next five to twenty-five years of our lives in jail. Ever since SDS became revolutionary, we've been trying to show how it is possible to overcome frustration and impotence that comes from trying to reform this system. Kids know the lines are drawn: revolution is touching all of our lives. Tens of thousands have learned that protest and marches don't do it. Revolutionary violence is the only way.

— Bernardine Dohrn

Dohrn subsequently stated that it was Fred Hampton's death that prompted the Weather Underground to declare war on the U.S. government.

We felt that the murder of Fred required us to be more grave, more serious, more determined to raise the stakes and not just be the white people who wrung their hands when black people were being murdered.

— Bernardine Dohrn

On May 21, 1970, a communiqué from the Weather Underground was issued promising to attack a "symbol or institution of American injustice" within two weeks. The communiqué included taunts towards the FBI, daring them to try to find the group, whose members were spread throughout the United States. Many leftist organizations showed curiosity in the communiqué, and waited to see if the act would in fact occur. However, two weeks would pass without any occurrence. Then on June 9, 1970, their first publicly acknowledged bombing occurred at a New York City police station. The FBI placed the Weather Underground organization on the ten most-wanted list by the end of 1970.

=== Activity in 1970 ===
In February 1970 Howard Machtinger carried out a bomb attack on a police station in Berkeley, California. Several police officers were injured, one seriously.

On June 9, 1970, a bomb made with ten sticks of dynamite exploded in the 240 Centre Street headquarters of the New York City Police Department. The explosion was preceded by a warning about six minutes prior to the detonation and was followed by a WUO claim of responsibility.

On July 23, 1970, a Detroit federal grand jury indicted 13 Weathermen members in a national bombing conspiracy, along with several unnamed co-conspirators. Ten of the thirteen already had outstanding federal warrants.

In September 1970 the group accepted a $25,000 payment from the largest international psychedelic drug distribution organization, called The Brotherhood of Eternal Love, to break LSD advocate Timothy Leary out of a California prison in San Luis Obispo, north of Santa Barbara, California, and transport him and his wife to Algeria, where Leary joined Eldridge Cleaver.

In October 1970, Dohrn was put on the FBI's Ten Most Wanted List.

=== United States Capitol bombing ===
On March 1, 1971, members of the Weather Underground set off a bomb on the Senate side of the United States Capitol. While the bomb smashed windows and caused hundreds of thousands of dollars' worth of damage, there were no casualties.

=== Pentagon bombing ===
Investigators search for clues after the May 19, 1972, Weatherman bombing of the Pentagon

On May 19, 1972, Ho Chi Minh's birthday, the Weather Underground placed a bomb in the women's bathroom in the Air Force wing of the Pentagon. The damage caused flooding that destroyed computer tapes holding classified information. Other radical groups worldwide applauded the bombing, illustrated by German youths protesting against American military systems in Frankfurt. This was "in retaliation for the U.S. bombing raid in Hanoi."

=== Withdrawal of charges ===
In 1973, the government requested dropping charges against most of the WUO members. The requests cited a recent decision by the Supreme Court of the United States that barred electronic surveillance without a court order. This Supreme Court decision would hamper any prosecution of the WUO cases. In addition, the government did not want to reveal foreign intelligence secrets that a trial would require. Bernardine Dohrn was removed from the FBI's Ten Most Wanted List on 7 December 1973. As with the earlier federal grand juries that subpoenaed Leslie Bacon and Stew Albert in the U.S. Capitol bombing case, these investigations were known as "fishing expeditions", with the evidence gathered through "black bag" jobs including illegal mail openings that involved the FBI and United States Postal Service, burglaries by FBI field offices, and electronic surveillance by the Central Intelligence Agency against the support network, friends, and family members of the Weather Underground as part of Nixon's COINTELPRO apparatus.

These grand juries caused Sylvia Jane Brown, Robert Gelbhard, and future members of the Seattle Weather Collective to be subpoenaed in Seattle and Portland for the investigation of one of the first (and last) captured WUO members. Four months afterwards the cases were dismissed. The decisions in these cases led directly to the subsequent resignation of FBI Director, L. Patrick Gray, and the federal indictments of W. Mark Felt or "Deep Throat" and Edwin Miller and which, earlier, was the factor leading to the removal of federal "most-wanted" status against members of the Weather Underground leadership in 1973.

=== Prairie Fire ===
With the help of Clayton Van Lydegraf, the Weather Underground sought a more Marxist–Leninist ideological approach to the post-Vietnam reality. The leading members of the Weather Underground (Bill Ayers, Bernardine Dohrn, Jeff Jones, and Celia Sojourn) collaborated on ideas and published a manifesto: Prairie Fire: The Politics of Revolutionary Anti-Imperialism. The name came from a quote by Mao Zedong, "a single spark can set a prairie fire." By the summer of 1974, five thousand copies had surfaced in coffee houses, bookstores and public libraries across the U.S. Leftist newspapers praised the manifesto.

Abbie Hoffman publicly praised Prairie Fire and believed every American should be given a copy. The manifesto's influence initiated the formation of the Prairie Fire Organizing Committee in several American cities. Hundreds of above-ground activists helped further the new political vision of the Weather Underground. Essentially, after the 1969 failure of the Days of Rage to involve thousands of youths in massive street fighting, Weather renounced most of the Left and decided to operate as an isolated underground group. Prairie Fire urged people to never "dissociate mass struggle from revolutionary violence". To do so, asserted Weatherman, was to do the state's work. Just as in 1969–1970, Weather still refused to renounce revolutionary violence for "to leave people unprepared to fight the state is to seriously mislead them about the inevitable nature of what lies ahead". However, the decision to build only an underground group caused the Weather Underground to lose sight of its commitment to mass struggle and made future alliances with the mass movement difficult and tenuous.

By 1974, Weatherman had recognized this shortcoming and in Prairie Fire detailed a different strategy for the 1970s which demanded both mass and clandestine organizations. The role of a clandestine organization would be to build the "consciousness of action" and prepare the way for the development of a people's militia. Concurrently, the role of the mass movement (i.e., above-ground Prairie Fire collective) would include support for, and encouragement of, armed action. Such an alliance would, according to Weather, "help create the 'sea' for the guerrillas to swim in".

According to Bill Ayers, writing in 2001, by the late 1970s, the Weatherman group had further split into two factions—the May 19th Communist Organization and the Prairie Fire Collective—with Bernardine Dohrn and Bill Ayers in the latter. The Prairie Fire Collective favored coming out of hiding and establishing an above-ground revolutionary mass movement. With most WUO members facing limited criminal charges (most charges had been dropped by the government in 1973) against them creating an above-ground organization was more feasible. The May 19 Communist Organization continued in hiding as the clandestine organization. A decisive factor in Dohrn's coming out of hiding was her concerns about her children. The Prairie Fire Collective faction started to surrender to the authorities from the late 1970s to the early 1980s. The remaining Weather Underground members continued to attack U.S. institutions.

== COINTELPRO ==
=== Event ===
In April 1971, the "Citizens' Commission to Investigate the FBI" broke into an FBI office in Media, Pennsylvania. The group stole files with several hundred pages. The files detailed the targeting of civil rights leaders, labor rights organizations, and left-wing groups in general, and included documentation of acts of intimidation and disinformation by the FBI and attempts to erode public support for those popular movements. By the end of April, the FBI offices were to terminate all files dealing with leftist groups. The files were part of an FBI program called COINTELPRO.

After COINTELPRO was dissolved in 1971 by J. Edgar Hoover, the FBI continued its counterintelligence on groups like the Weather Underground. In 1973, the FBI established the "Special Target Information Development" program, where agents were sent undercover to penetrate the Weather Underground. Due to the illegal tactics of FBI agents involved with the program, government attorneys requested all weapons- and bomb-related charges be dropped against the Weather Underground. The most well-publicized of these tactics were the "black-bag jobs", referring to searches conducted in the homes of relatives and acquaintances of Weatherman. The Weather Underground was no longer a fugitive organization and could turn themselves in with minimal charges against them. Additionally, the illegal domestic spying conducted by the CIA in collaboration with the FBI also lessened the legal repercussions for Weatherman turning themselves in.

=== Investigation and trial ===
After the Church Committee revealed the FBI's illegal activities, many agents were investigated. In 1976, former FBI Associate Director W. Mark Felt publicly stated he had ordered break-ins and that individual agents were merely obeying orders and should not be punished for it. Felt also stated that acting Director L. Patrick Gray had also authorized the break-ins, but Gray denied this. Felt said on the CBS television program Face the Nation that he would probably be a "scapegoat" for the Bureau's work. "I think this is justified and I'd do it again tomorrow," he said on the program. While admitting the break-ins were "extralegal", he justified it as protecting the "greater good". Felt said, "To not take action against these people and know of a bombing in advance would simply be to stick your fingers in your ears and protect your eardrums when the explosion went off and then start the investigation."

The Attorney General in the new Carter administration, Griffin Bell, investigated, and on April 10, 1978, a federal grand jury charged Felt, Edward S. Miller, and Gray with conspiracy to violate the constitutional rights of American citizens by searching their homes without warrants. Gray's case did not go to trial and was dropped by the government for lack of evidence on December 11, 1980.

The indictment charged violations of Title 18, Section 241 of the United States Code. The indictment charged Felt and the others "did unlawfully, willfully, and knowingly combine, conspire, confederate, and agree together and with each other to injure and oppress citizens of the United States who were relatives and acquaintances of the Weatherman fugitives, in the free exercise and enjoyments of certain rights and privileges secured to them by the Constitution and the laws of the United States of America."

Felt and Miller attempted to plea bargain with the government, willing to agree to a misdemeanor guilty plea to conducting searches without warrants—a violation of 18 U.S.C. sec. 2236—but the government rejected the offer in 1979. After eight postponements, the case against Felt and Miller went to trial in the United States District Court for the District of Columbia on September 18, 1980. On October 29, former President Richard Nixon appeared as a rebuttal witness for the defense, and testified that presidents since Franklin D. Roosevelt had authorized the bureau to engage in break-ins while conducting foreign intelligence and counterespionage investigations.

It was Nixon's first courtroom appearance since his resignation in 1974. Nixon also contributed money to Felt's legal defense fund, with Felt's legal expenses running over $600,000. Also testifying were former Attorneys General Herbert Brownell Jr., Nicholas Katzenbach, Ramsey Clark, John N. Mitchell, and Richard G. Kleindienst, all of whom said warrantless searches in national security matters were commonplace and not understood to be illegal, but Mitchell and Kleindienst denied they had authorized any of the break-ins at issue in the trial.

The jury returned guilty verdicts on November 6, 1980. Although the charge carried a maximum sentence of 10 years in prison, Felt was fined $5,000. (Miller was fined $3,500.) Writing in The New York Times a week after the conviction, Roy Cohn claimed that Felt and Miller were being used as scapegoats by the Carter administration and that it was an unfair prosecution. Cohn wrote it was the "final dirty trick" and that there had been no "personal motive" for their actions.

The Times saluted the convictions, saying that it showed "the case has established that zeal is no excuse for violating the Constitution". Felt and Miller appealed the verdict, and they were later pardoned by Ronald Reagan.

== Dissolution and aftermath ==
Despite the change in their legal status, the Weather Underground remained underground for a few more years. However, by 1976 the organization was disintegrating. The Weather Underground held a conference in Chicago called Hard Times. The idea was to create an umbrella organization for all radical groups. However, the event turned sour when Hispanic and Black groups accused the Weather Underground and the Prairie Fire Committee of limiting their roles in racial issues. The Weather Underground faced accusations of abandoning the revolution by reversing its original ideology.

The conference increased divisions within the Weather Underground. East coast members favored a commitment to violence and challenged the commitments of old leaders, Dohrn, Ayers, and Jones. These older members found they were no longer liable for federal prosecution because of illegal wire taps and the government's unwillingness to reveal sources and methods favored a strategy of inversion where they would be above-ground "revolutionary leaders". Jeremy Varon argues that by 1977 the WUO had disbanded.

Matthew Steen appeared on the lead segment of CBS's 60 Minutes in 1976 and was interviewed by Mike Wallace about the ease of creating fake identification, the first ex-Weatherman interview on national television. (Note: The House document has the date wrong, it aired February 1, 1976, and the title was Fake ID.)

The federal government estimated that only 38 Weathermen had gone underground in 1970, though the estimates varied widely, according to a variety of official and unofficial sources, as between 50 and 600 members. Most modern sources lean towards a much larger number than the FBI reference. An FBI estimate in 1976, or slightly later, of the current membership was down to 30 or fewer.

=== Plot to bomb the office of a California State Senator ===
In November 1977, five WUO members were arrested on conspiracy to bomb the office of California State Senator John Briggs. It was later revealed that the Revolutionary Committee and the PFOC had both been infiltrated by the FBI for almost six years. FBI agents Richard J. Gianotti and William D. Reagan lost their cover in November when federal judges needed their testimony to issue warrants for the arrest of Clayton Van Lydegraf and four Weather people. The arrests were the results of the infiltration. WUO members Judith Bissell, Thomas Justesen, Leslie Mullin, and Marc Curtis pleaded guilty while Van Lydegraf, who helped write the 1974 Prairie Fire Manifesto, went to trial.

Within two years, many members took advantage of President Jimmy Carter's amnesty for draft dodgers by turning themselves in. Mark Rudd turned himself into authorities on January 20, 1978. Rudd was released on a $4,000 bail, later pleading guilty and being fined $2,000 with two years' probation. Bernardine Dohrn and Bill Ayers turned themselves in on December 3, 1980, in New York, with substantial media coverage. Charges were dropped for Ayers. Dohrn received three years' probation and a $1,500 fine.

=== Brink's robbery ===
Some members remained underground and joined splinter radical groups. Kathy Boudin, Judith Alice Clark, and David Gilbert joined the May 19 Communist Organization, and on October 20, 1981, in Nanuet, New York, the group helped the Black Liberation Army rob a Brink's armored truck containing $1.6 million. The robbery resulted in a shootout and the deaths of Brink's Guard Peter Paige, Police Sergeant Edward O'Grady Jr., and Police Officer Waverly Brown, the first black police officer on the Nyack police force.

Boudin, Clark, and Gilbert were found guilty and sentenced to lengthy terms in prison. Media reports listed them as former Weatherman Underground members, considered the "last gasps" of the Weather Underground. The documentary The Weather Underground described the Brink's robbery as the "unofficial end" of the Weather Underground.

=== May 19th Communist Organization ===
The Weather Underground members who were involved in the May 19th Communist Organization's alliance with the Black Liberation Army continued to perpetrate a series of jail breaks, armed robberies, and bombings until 1985, when most of them were arrested and sentenced for their involvement in the Brink's robbery and the Resistance Conspiracy case.

== Relationships with non-WUO members ==
Throughout their years in the underground, the members of the Weather Underground worked closely with their counterparts in other organizations, including Jane Alpert, to attract press attention to their actions. Alpert helped the Weathermen pursue their main goal of overthrowing the U.S. government through her writings. However, there were tensions within the organization, brought about by her manifesto, "Mother Right", that specifically called on the female members of the organization to focus on their own cause rather than anti-imperialist causes. Weatherman members then wrote in response to her manifesto.

Jefferson Airplane secretly sent money to the Weather Underground.

== Legacy ==
The Weather Underground was described as a terrorist group by The New York Times, United Press International, and Time. More recent New York Times retrospectives have characterized the organization as a far-left militant group in discussions of twentieth-century political violence. The FBI considered it a terrorist group. Some members have disputed the "terrorist" categorization and justified the group's actions as an appropriate response to what they described as the "terrorist activities" of the war in Vietnam, domestic racism, and the deaths of black leaders.

Ayers objected to the description of the WUO as a terrorist organization in his 2001 book Fugitive Days. "Terrorists terrorize," he argues, "they kill innocent civilians, while we organized and agitated. Terrorists destroy randomly, while our actions bore, we hoped, the precise stamp of a cut diamond. Terrorists intimidate, while we aimed only to educate." Dan Berger asserts in Outlaws of America that the group "purposefully and successfully avoided injuring anyone" as an argument that their actions were not terrorism. "Its war against property by definition means that the WUO was not a terrorist organization."

Others, however, have disputed these arguments. Former Weather Underground member Mark Rudd admitted that the group intended to target people prior to the accidental explosion in the town house. Grand juries were convened in 2001 and 2009 to investigate whether Weather Underground was responsible for the San Francisco Police Department Park Station bombing, in which one officer was killed, one was maimed, and eight more were wounded by shrapnel from a pipe bomb. They ultimately concluded that members of the Black Liberation Army were responsible, with whom WUO members were affiliated. They were also responsible for the bombing of another police precinct in San Francisco, as well as bombing the Catholic Church funeral services of the police officer killed in the Park Precinct bombing in the early summer of 1970. Howard Machtinger has acknowledged carrying out a bomb attack on a police station in February 1970 that resulted in injuries.

Ayers said in a 2001 New York Times interview, "I don't regret setting bombs". He has since claimed that he was misquoted. Mark Rudd teaches mathematics at Central New Mexico Community College, and he has said that he doesn't speak publicly about his experiences because he has "mixed feelings, guilt and shame". "These are things I am not proud of, and I find it hard to speak publicly about them and to tease out what was right from what was wrong."

Some former members of Weatherman (including Ayers, Dohrn, Rudd, Machtinger, and, after her incarceration, Boudin) found careers in academia after emerging from the underground. Ayers' relationship with Barack Obama was a source of controversy during Obama's 2008 presidential campaign. Boudin and Gilbert's son Chesa Boudin, raised by Ayers and Dohrn while his birth parents were incarcerated, served as Attorney General of San Francisco for three years.

== In popular culture ==
The Weather Underground was the subject of the documentaries Underground (1976) and the Academy Awards-nominated The Weather Underground (2002).

Fictional works inspired by the group's history include the novels Local Deities (1990) by Agnes Bushell, American Pastoral (1997) by Philip Roth, and The Company You Keep (2003, adapted into a film in 2012) by Neil Gordon; the David Mamet play The Anarchist (2012); and the films Katherine (1975) and Running on Empty (1988).

== See also ==
- Domestic terrorism in the United States
- List of incidents of political violence in Washington, D.C.
- List of Weatherman members
- Osawatomie (periodical)
- Radicalism in the United States
- Terrorism in the United States
