= Mark Rudd =

American anti-war activist and math teacher

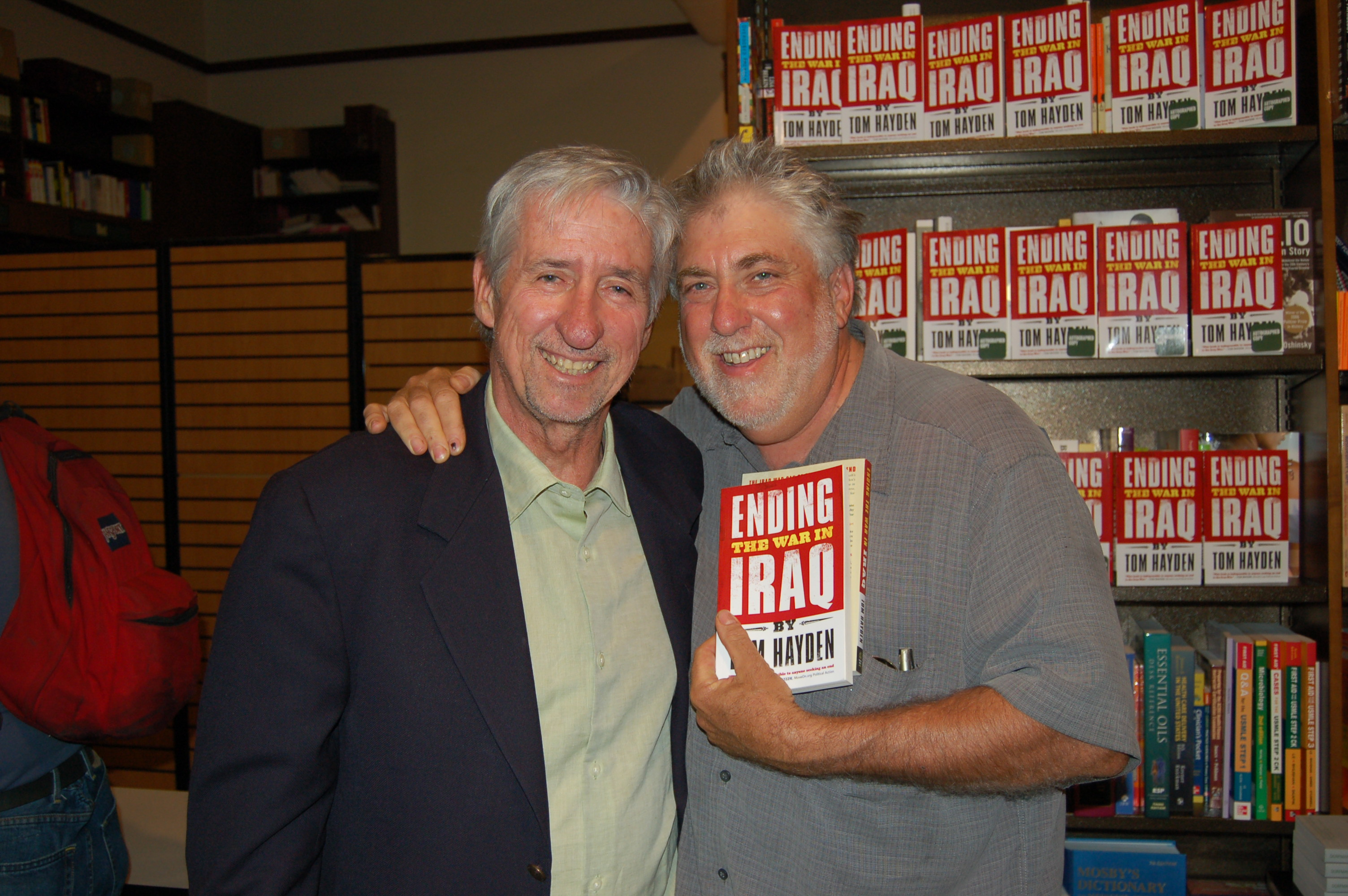
- Mark Rudd (right) with Tom Hayden; Strand Bookstore, New York City, 2007
- Born: June 2, 1947 (age 79); Irvington, New Jersey, U.S.
- Education: Columbia University
- Spouse: Marla Painter

External videos
- Panel: How Black Students Helped Lead the 1968 Columbia U. Strike Against Militarism & Racism 50 Years Ago

Mark William Rudd (born June 2, 1947) is an American political organizer, mathematics instructor, anti-war activist and counterculture figure who was involved with the Weather Underground in the 1960s.

Rudd became a member of the Columbia University chapter of Students for a Democratic Society (SDS) in 1963. By 1968, he had emerged as a leader for Columbia's SDS chapter. During the 1968 Columbia University Protests, he served as spokesperson for dissident students protesting a variety of issues, particularly the Vietnam War. As the war escalated, Mark Rudd worked with other youth movement leaders to take SDS in a more militant direction. While much of the general membership of SDS refused to countenance violence, Rudd and some other prominent SDS members formed a paramilitary organization inspired by the Red Guard, referring to themselves collectively as "Weatherman" after the lyrics from a famous Bob Dylan song.

Rudd went "underground" in 1970, hiding from law enforcement following the Greenwich Village townhouse explosion that killed three of his Weather Underground peers. He surrendered to authorities in 1977 and served a short jail sentence. He taught mathematics at Central New Mexico Community College, and retired in Albuquerque, New Mexico. Rudd has since expressed regret for his role in the Weather Underground, and he now advocates for nonviolence and electoral change.

== Early life ==
Rudd was born in Irvington, New Jersey. His father, Jacob S. Rudd (1909–1995), was born Jacob Shmuel Rudnitsky in Stanislower, Poland; he was a former army officer who sold real estate in Maplewood, New Jersey. His mother, Bertha Bass (1912–2009), was born in Elizabeth, New Jersey, the year after her parents emigrated from Lithuania. Rudd had a brother, David R. Rudd (1939–2009), who became an attorney. His family was Jewish. Rudd attended Columbia High School in his hometown of Maplewood, New Jersey, and later Columbia University in New York.

== Campus activism ==
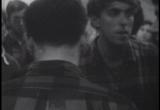
Rudd (facing camera) was a leader during the Columbia University protests of 1968. Image taken from the film Columbia Revolt.

He identified the Vietnam War as an imperialist war and first tried to stop the university's involvement in the war. He also supported the black power movement. Rudd said they were protesting horrors like Agent Orange defoliation and the carpet bombing in Vietnam. Mark Rudd's website says that his commitment to "fighting U.S imperialism" was inspired by the revolutionary movement in Cuba, which at that time was in its ninth year.

In 1968, Rudd and Bernardine Dohrn and other leaders of SDS were invited to Cuba to meet with Cuban, Soviet, and North Vietnamese delegates. His experiences in Cuba strengthened Rudd's anti-war and pro-Communist sentiments. Rudd had described the life of Cuba as "extremely humanistic" and he idealized Ernesto "Che" Guevara, referring to him as the "Heroic Guerrilla."

Once he returned from Cuba, Rudd was elected President of the Columbia chapter of SDS. In 1968, during his junior year, Rudd was expelled from Columbia after a series of sit-ins and riots that disrupted campus life and attracted nationwide attention. These events culminated in the dramatic occupation of several campus buildings, including the Administration building, Low Memorial Library, and which ended only after violent clashes between students and the New York Police Department.

The Columbia protest was not the first student revolt on an American campus, but as it occurred at a relatively conservative Ivy League school located just up the street from the headquarters of the nation's news media, it received considerable press coverage and drew many supporters. The protests produced the slogan "Create Two, Three, Many Columbias!" The Doonesbury character Mark Slackmeyer was inspired by Rudd.

== Revolutionary Youth Movement and Weather Underground ==
In 1969, as SDS membership grew rapidly, members' views concerning both goals and methods began to diverge widely. Rudd felt that SDS was not doing enough to protest the war in Vietnam. He was a leader of the Revolutionary Youth Movement (RYM), a faction of SDS, which advocated a more militant course of action while other factions within SDS were becoming concerned about Rudd's increasingly vocal calls for violent confrontation and hardline Communist sentiments. The 1969 SDS convention effectively splintered and ended the organization. Rudd and other former RYM members ultimately formed Weatherman, a self-proclaimed "organization of communist women and men." The new organization was intent on overthrowing the government through violent actions. Spreading communism was a priority for the members of Weather, as when Rudd told other members of SDS, " Don't be timid about telling people we're Communist. Don't deny it, be proud of it."

== Years underground ==
Rudd and other members of Weatherman participated in an SDS National Action on October 8–11, 1969, an event which became known as the Days of Rage. Charges filed against demonstrators following this action threatened the movement and its supporters. Rudd was demoted within the organization in January 1970.

Rudd, along with other prominent members of Weather, went underground in March 1970 following the Greenwich Village townhouse explosion, an incident in which three members of the organization died when an explosive device, intended for a servicemen's ball, detonated prematurely. The dead were Terry Robbins, Diana Oughton, and Ted Gold, who was Rudd's friend and partner in RYM and the Columbia sit-ins.

Weatherman had already come to the attention of the FBI, but this explosion caused the members of Weatherman to take further precautions and to engage in more clandestine operations and according to some Weatherman members like Bill Ayers, build an underground revolutionary movement. According to Kirkpatrick Sale, Rudd was regarded as arrogant and politically ignorant by the other leaders, and was further demoted in the organization by the end of the year.

After the townhouse explosion, the government actively sought to apprehend Mark Rudd and twelve other members of the Weather Underground Organization (WUO). For seven years Rudd lived underground, although he was disengaged from the WUO for most of that time.

== Reappearance ==
On September 14, 1977, Rudd turned himself in to authorities, tired of life as a fugitive. He had been living and working under an assumed name just a few miles from the Columbia campus in Brooklyn and was increasingly frustrated over his lifestyle which included his inability to see his family as well as working in manual labor jobs beneath his education. Due to FBI abuses against Vietnam protestors and others during the COINTELPRO program, Rudd could not be convicted of many of the crimes alleged in the original government complaint against him that led to his fugitive status. He received a small fine and ultimately spent less than one year in prison. His first public appearance was on campus, where he spoke to a crowd of hundreds of admiring students. He was not the firebrand the crowd expected, but he did participate in a march around the campus after the speech.

== Later developments ==
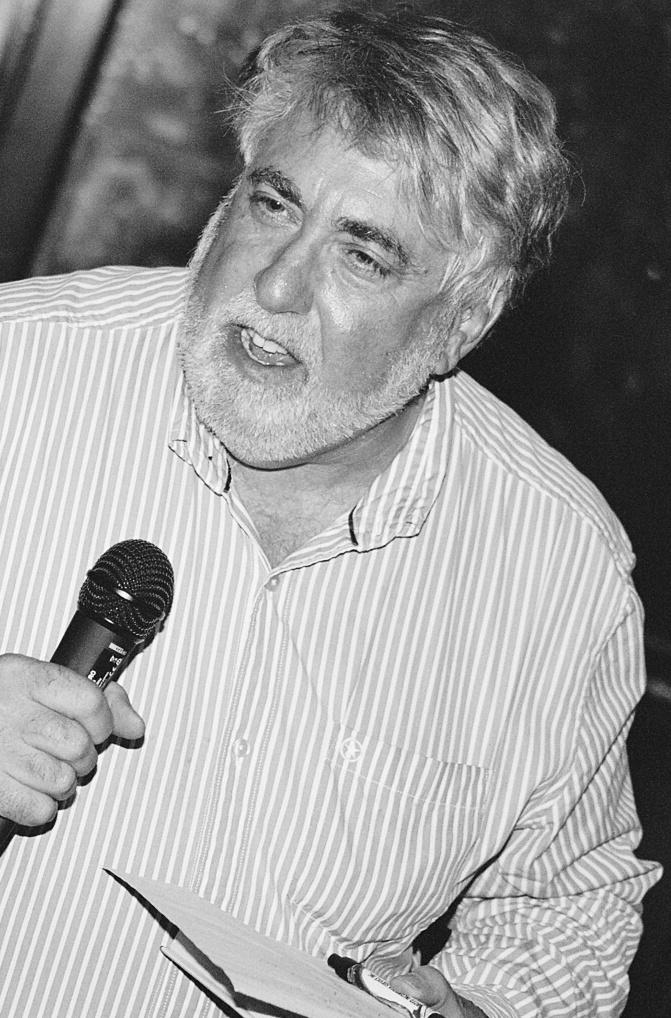
Mark Rudd, speaking at the West End Bar on March 26, 2009.

In the summer of 1978, Rudd and his then-girlfriend, Sue LeGrand, moved to Albuquerque, New Mexico. During his time there he became an instructor of mathematics at Central New Mexico Community College (then known as the Albuquerque Technical Vocational Institute, or TVI). At the time he was hired and during his early employment at the college, Rudd's years as a student radical and Federal fugitive were almost unknown to his students and other faculty members who seldom asked if he was "that" Mark Rudd. Most of these individuals were of a different generation and the name "Mark Rudd" had ceased to be a household word. Rudd regarded this lack of critical attention with some disdain.

In 1990, he published a memoir called Truth and Consequences: The Education of Mark Rudd, which detailed his life with SDS, the Columbia University riots, and his time as a fugitive.

Rudd was interviewed for the 2002 documentary, The Weather Underground, in which he stated that although the group's motivations, to end the Vietnam War and to oppose US imperialism, were justified, the violent actions performed in pursuit of those beliefs were questionable. He was the only former Weather member featured in the film that regretted his involvement in the group.

He opposed the United States-led invasion of Iraq in 2003.

Today Rudd lives in Albuquerque, New Mexico, with his wife, Marla (Painter). Rudd maintains a website called MarkRudd.com where he frequently posts essays and other writings, including his opinions on contemporary issues, and a personal appearance schedule. He travels around the country in support of the newly reborn Students for a Democratic Society. Rudd, along with Brian Kelly of Pace SDS, have helped establish ties between the new SDS and the Kent State University movement. He wrote a second book on his time with SDS and The Weathermen called Underground: My Life with the SDS and the Weathermen, published by HarperCollins in 2009. This work is more a personal memoir than a political statement as was his first book.

Documentary filmmaker Sam Green made a 2008 short entitled Clear Glasses, which focuses on a pair of glasses Rudd sent him.

In 2008, Rudd spoke about the Vietnam War era activities of SDS and his involvement in them for the award-winning documentary film Superpower by Barbara-Anne Steegmuller.

In 2020, Rudd appeared in the documentary film The Boys Who Said No!, which explores the anti-Vietnam War and draft resistance movement.

In 2024, he said of pro-Palestinian protests on university campuses against Israel's war on Gaza: "For me, it's the most normal thing in the world to look at the murder of 34,000 people and the displacement of close to 2 million in Gaza and say, ‘Hey, stop!"

== Works ==
- Mark Rudd, Truth and Consequences: The Education of Mark Rudd, Grove Press, 1990, ISBN 978-0-8021-1269-9
- Mark Rudd, Underground: My Life with SDS and the Weathermen, William Morrow, 2009, ISBN 978-0-06-147275-6
