= Jim Mellen =

American activist and academic (1935–2023)

- Jim Mellen marching in Chicago, 1969
- Born: James Gerald Mellen; August 13, 1935; Inglewood, California, U.S.
- Died: February 17, 2023 (aged 87); Zirahuén, Mexico
- Known for: Founding member of the Weather Underground

James Gerald Mellen (13 August 1935 – 17 February 2023) was an American Marxist college professor, revolutionary, and a founding member of the Weathermen, a far-left revolutionary organization.

== Early life and academic career ==
Mellen was born in Inglewood, California, in 1935, to Helen and Dennis Mellen. His parents divorced when he was young, and he later explained that growing up in poverty fueled his leftist politics. Mellen went to community college and later enrolled at UCLA before dropping out. Inspired by the writing of Jack Kerouac, he moved to San Francisco in the late 1950s. He then attended San Francisco State College, where he began protesting the proliferation of nuclear weapons. After gaining a PhD from the University of Iowa, Mellen took a position as a political science and international affairs professor at Drew University. Mellen lost this job in 1965 after, during a talk at a teach-in, expressing support for Eugene Genovese's opinion that a victory for the Vietcong victory in the Vietnam War was not to be feared. Following his termination, Mellen co-founded the Free University of New York with Allen Krebs and his wife Sharon Krebs. Mellen went to teach in Dar es Salaam in 1966 and returned to the US in 1968. He then became a strong advocate in the anti-war organization Students for a Democratic Society (SDS), despite being older than many of the members. It was during his time with the SDS that Mellen met people who would eventually form the Weathermen.

== Weather Underground ==
As a principal author and one of the 11 signatories of the 1969 Weathermen manifesto, Mellen became a founding member and the intellectual backbone of the Weathermen. He brought Marxist theory and a sense of seriousness that the organization had previously lacked. The manifesto advocated for revolutionaries, regardless of race, to unite to destroy "U.S. imperialism and the achievement of classless world: world communism.” In 2016, Mellen claimed he was only involved in a less radical early draft of the manifesto. Mellen became less active in the Weathermen and eventually left as the group started to embrace more violent methods and became the Weather Underground. The FBI have said that the Weather Underground eventually claimed to be behind for 25 bombings.

== Later life ==
In the 1980s, after earning a law degree, Mellen started a law practice in the San Francisco area that mainly assisted disadvantaged clients. After retiring in 2008, he moved to Zirahuén, Mexico, with his wife, Terry Baumgart. Mellen died at home on February 17, 2023, from chronic obstructive pulmonary disease. Mellen had two children from his first marriage when he was very young, and from a later marriage to Katherine Donovan he had George (born 1986) and Emily (born 1990) Mellen. He is also survived by his sister Jackie.
