= Robert Cullenbine =

American politician (1938–2018)

Robert Stephens Cullenbine (May 28, 1938 - July 29, 2018) was one of the Merry Pranksters and a coordinator at Mid-peninsula Free University.

== Biography ==
Robert "Bob" "Cully" "Papa Elf" Cullenbine was raised in St. Louis, Missouri. He attended Yale University and Washington University in St. Louis prior to moving in 1958 to Palo Alto, California. He served in the U.S. Army and then attended Stanford University. from which he received a BA in economics. He was a Vietnam era anti-war activist and community organizer with the Midpeninsula Free University serving as the college's coordinator (President) in 1969. Fred Nelson and Ed McClanahan's 1973 book “One Lord, One Faith, One Cornbread,” a collection of articles, poetry, and fiction from the Midpeninsula Free University's “Free You” magazine, was dedicated to Cullenbine.

In 1998 he left his career in real estate to devote full-time to The Family Giving Tree, a charity founded by his daughter Jennifer. He served as the organization's CFO and development director, and retired in 2008. In 2008 he founded Children First Focus, a non-profit serving children internationally. He is a former board member of The Association of Fundraising Professionals, Silicon Valley Chapter. Cullenbine served in Missouri as one of presidential candidate Senator Barack Obama's Deputy Field Organizers during the 2008 campaign.

Cullenbine was one of 135 candidates who ran for California governor in the 2003 California gubernatorial recall election, receiving 632 votes.
