= Samuel Grossman =

Samuel Grossman may refer to:

- Samuel S. Grossman, Jewish composer, see I Have a Little Dreidel
- Samuel J. Grossman (1934–1971), birth name of Sam Melville, an American criminal
