= Women's liberation (disambiguation) =

The women's liberation movement was a political movement born in the 1960s from Second-Wave Feminism.

Women's Liberation or Women's Lib may also refer to:

- Feminist movement
- Women's LibeRATion, an incarnation of the Rat newspaper
- Women's Lib (The Goodies), an episode of The Goodies
