= Free University of New York =

Social enterprise

- Other name: Free School of New York (from 1966)
- Type: Free university
- Active: 1965–1970/71
- Founders: Allen Krebs, Sharon Krebs and Jim Mellen
- Location: 20 East 14th Street, Manhattan, New York

The Free University of New York (FUNY) was an educational social enterprise initiated by Allen Krebs, his wife Sharon Krebs, and James Mellen in July 1965.

== History ==
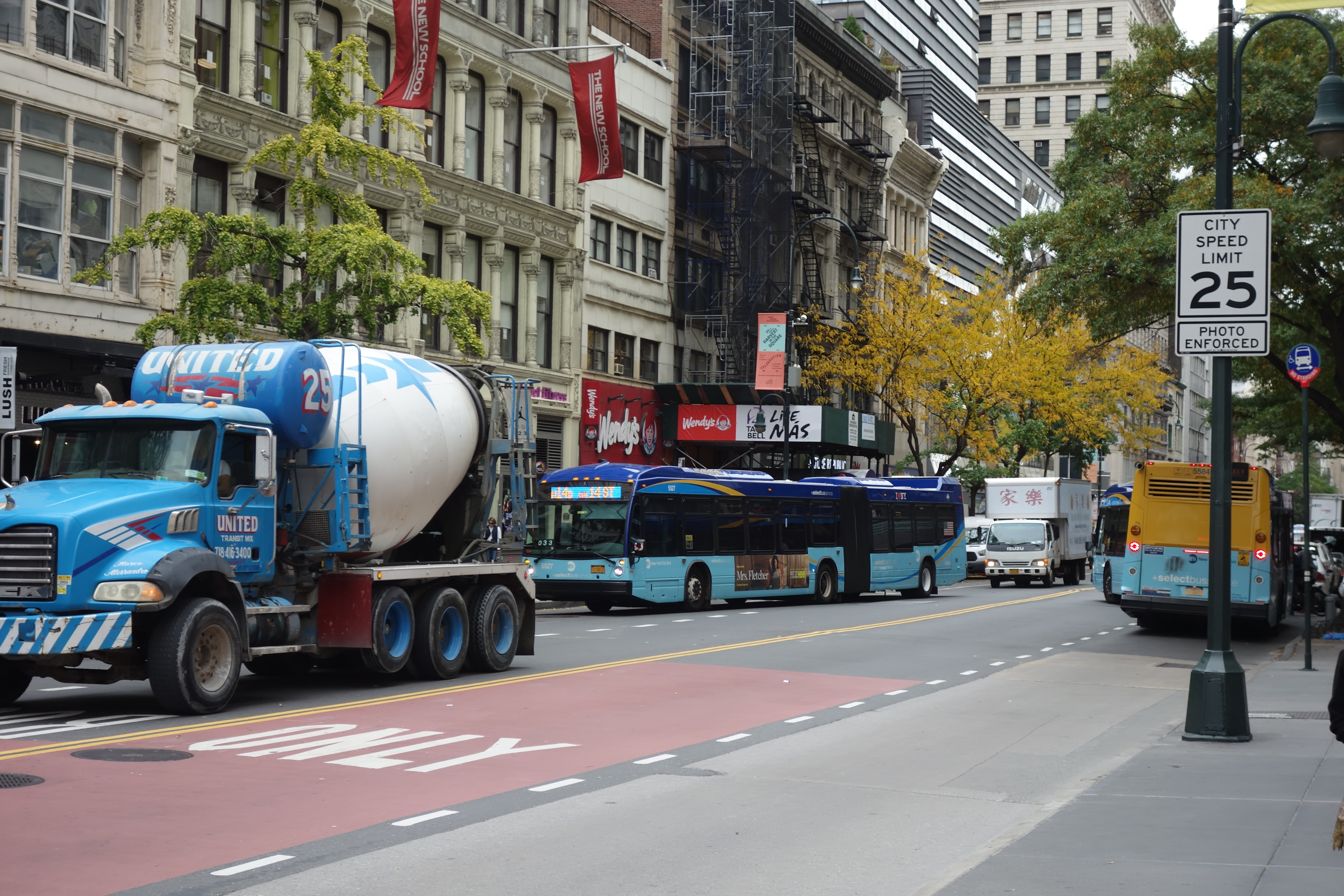
The FUNY opened on East 14th Street, above a storefront now occupied by a Wendy's

FUNY began as a home for professors dismissed from local universities for protesting the Vietnam War, or for holding socialist views. Course topics included: Black Liberation, Revolutionary Art and Ethics, Community Organization, The American Radical Tradition, Cuba and China, and Imperialism and Social Structure. FUNY opened on July 6, 1965 in a loft at 20 East 14th Street overlooking Union Square. FUNY began as an experimental school for the New Left, built on models such as Black Mountain College (North Carolina), though it became closely aligned with the Maoist Progressive Labor Party. Tuition for the 10-week session was $24 for the first course, and $8 for each additional course; welfare recipients could attend for free. FUNY also published the quarterly magazine Treason!. By July 1966 the FUNY had been forced to change its name to the Free School of New York (FSNY) after city authorities threatened to prosecute them for using the word "university" in their name without meeting the requirement of at least $500,000 in assets. After the first year, many of the initial collaborators left or were forced to leave, and it shut down a few years later.

== Notable participants ==
- Herbert Aptheker
- Stanley Aronowitz
- Lee Baxandall
- Joe Berke
- Charles R. Johnson
- Paul Krassner
- Tuli Kupferberg
- Leonard Liggio
- Staughton Lynd
- Bradford Lyttle
- Jackson Mac Low
- Lyn Marcus
- David McReynolds
- Hugo Mujica
- Carolee Schneemann
- Susan Simensky Bietila
- Robert Anton Wilson

== See also ==
- The New School
- Free university
- Midpeninsula Free University
- Antiuniversity of London
