= Kirill Martynov =

Russian journalist and philosopher

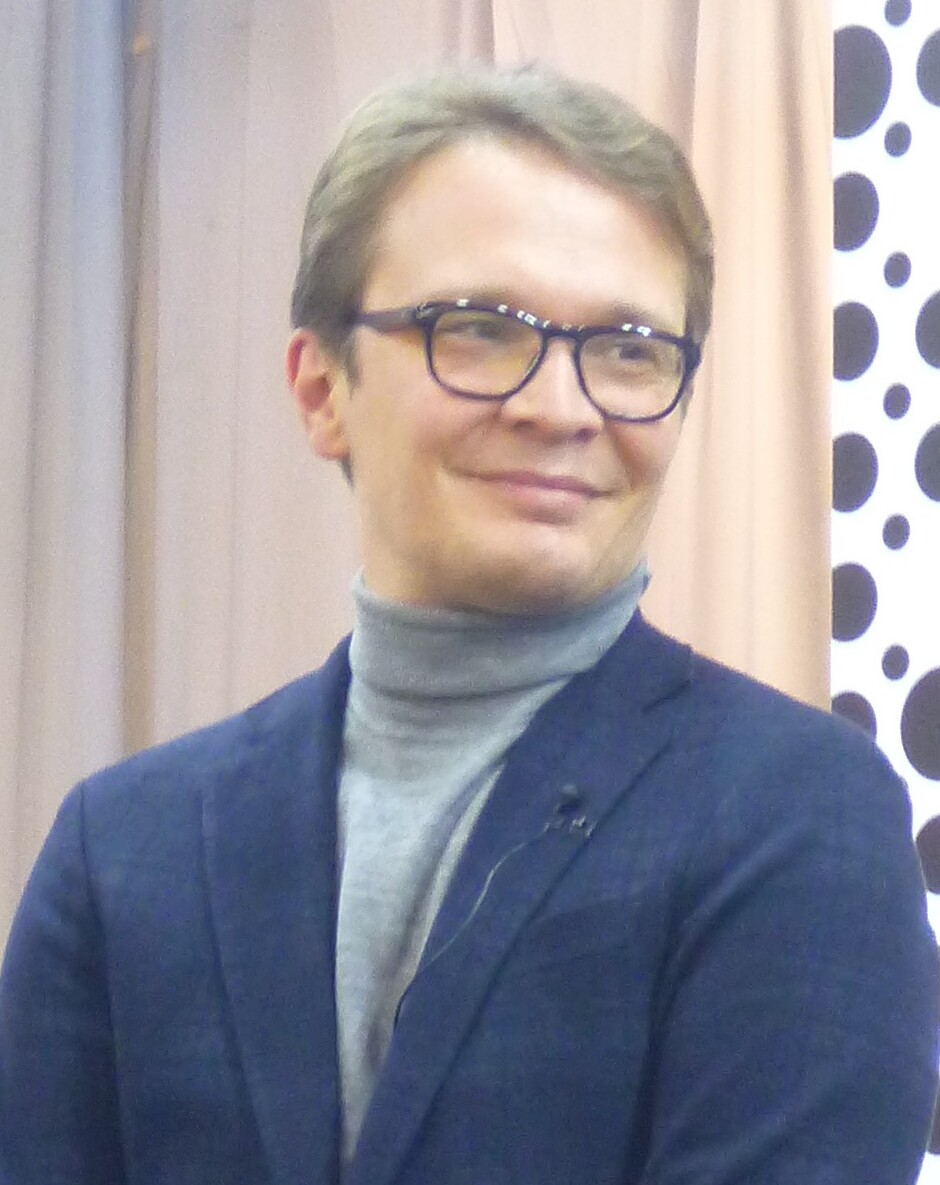
- Мартынов в 2020 году
- Employer: Novaya Gazeta Europe (2022–)

Kirill Konstantinovich Martynov (Russian: Кирилл Константинович Мартынов; born 25 April 1981) is a Russian journalist, political scientist, philosopher and writer. He is the editor-in-chief of Novaya Gazeta Europe and former associate professor at the Higher School of Economics (HSE).

== Early life and education ==
Kirill Martynov was born on 25 April 1981 in the city of Kemerovo, USSR. In 1998 he graduated from high school number 28 in Kemerovo. In 2003, Martynov graduated from the Faculty of Philosophy at Moscow State University with a degree in ontology and theory of knowledge. In 2004, Martynov created the Young Patriots (Младопатриоты) community on LiveJournal, a Russian social network. In this community, he wrote that he is Orthodox Christian and supports the annexation of Crimea to Russia.

Martynov speaks English and German.

== Career ==
From 2003 to 2007, Martynov was an assistant at the Department of Philosophy and Psychology at Moscow Polytechnic University. In 2007, he became a senior lecturer and then an assistant professor at the National Research University Higher School of Economics (HSE). Martynov also worked for the Foundation for Effective Politics, a Russian non-profit organisation founded by Gleb Pavlovsky. Martynov was named the best teacher of the HSE in 2011, 2013, 2014 and 2016–2019.

Martynov was also the editor in chief of the mnenia.ru (Russian: мнения.ру) website, a teacher at the Russian Presidential Academy of National Economy and Public Administration, a press secretary at the Federal Agency for Youth Affairs and a coordinator at the United Russia club.

In 2019, due to pressure from the Russian authorities, 2 journalists from the political department of the Russian newspaper Kommersant were fired and 11 more journalists from the same department resigned in protest. Martynov supported them. On 11 August 2020, it became known that he was fired from the HSE. The official reason given was the reduction in the number of philosophy courses. Martynov himself is sure that the dismissal is connected with his political views. He and several other dismissed HSE employees founded a free university in Russia.

On 20 April 2022, the Novaya Gazeta Europe website was launched. Martynov was its first chief editor. Prior to that, he was the political editor of Novaya Gazeta.

== Works ==
Fundamentals of the Theory of Political Parties (Основы теории политических партий).

== Personal life ==
Martynov was married to Antonina Martynova, a defendant in the Novgorod case. He is an atheist.
