= Peggy Dobbins =

- Born: Margaret Nell Powell; September 30, 1938 (age 88); Bell County, Texas
- Other name: Peggy Powell Dobbins
- Education: Wellesley College; University of Madrid; University of Alabama
- Occupations: Sociologist, human rights activist
- Years active: 1966–present

Peggy Dobbins (born September 30, 1938) is an American sociologist, and a civil and women's rights activist. Born and raised in Texas, she earned degrees from Wellesley College and the University of Madrid in the early 1960s. She participated in Freedom Summer in 1964 and was active in the Southern Student Organizing Committee. She began her PhD studies at Tulane University and taught one of the first women's studies courses in the country, in New Orleans in 1966. She suspended her studies when she married the following year and moved to New York City, where she was active in opposing the Vietnam War and the founding of the women's liberation movement.

Dobbins was a co-founder of New York Radical Women, wrote the Liturgy for the Burial of Traditional Womanhood, for the group's Arlington National Cemetery protest in Washington, D.C., and was arrested during the Miss America protest in New York City in 1968. When New York Radical Women splintered, she co-founded W.I.T.C.H. and continued to participate in street theater demonstrations in the New York metropolitan area. Returning to her studies in 1972, Dobbins earned a PhD in sociology and began teaching at the University of Alabama in Tuscaloosa in 1974. Seven years later, she was arrested in Birmingham, Alabama, when she attempted to perform a political skit wearing a mask. Although the charges on mask-wearing were found to be invalid, she was convicted of disorderly conduct. She was arrested later in 1981 and charged with disorderly conduct for refusing to leave the offices of The Birmingham News.

Having lost her university position, Dobbins worked for various NGOs, such as Protect America's Children and the National Association for the Advancement of Colored People, to support their work. She also volunteered with the Communist Party USA on various issues and continued to protest American involvement in wars. In the 1990s, she worked in a job training program for the city of Birmingham and from 1992 to 1996 served on the Housing Authority's board.

== Early life, education, and family ==
Margaret Nell Powell, later known as Peggy, was born on September 30, 1938, in Bell County, Texas to Paulina Otelia (née Jordan) and Sam Madison Powell Jr. Her father was a physician, who after serving in the US Army in World War II, was on the faculty of Harvard Medical School, before opening a private practice in Corpus Christi, Texas. He was chief of staff at Memorial Hospital in Corpus Christi from 1947 to 1961 and then relocated to Birmingham, Alabama to head the Birmingham Health Foundation. Peggy and her brother, Sam III, were raised in Corpus Christi. She was presented in the 1957–1958 debutante season after graduating from W. B. Ray High School. Continuing her education, Peggy enrolled as a political science major at Wellesley College in Wellesley, Massachusetts. She graduated in 1960 from Wellesley and then completed a degree at the University of Madrid in 1961. During her university studies, Powell became pregnant and had to give her son up for adoption. The event made her realize that other women had secret pregnancies and abortions and propelled her to speak publicly about abortion as a political issue.

== Activism (1960–1970) ==
Powell moved to New Orleans enrolled in graduate studies at Tulane University. She became involved in the civil rights movement and joined the Southern Student Organizing Committee. She participated in the Freedom Summer voter registration and Freedom School drives in 1964. At the time, there was not a women's movement and many women joined civil rights organizations. When they found they were pushed to the margins, women began organizing their own women's liberation movement. For example, Powell, Cathy Barrett, and Cathy Cade, each a sociology graduate student, launched a women's studies course at the New Orleans Free School in 1966. Although a handful of women's courses were offered at the time, such as Naomi Weisstein's "For and About Women" at the University of Chicago, Annette Kar Baxter's women's history course at Barnard College, and Gerda Lerner's class on women's history at The New School in New York City, none was accredited until 1969, when Cornell University formally approved the first women's studies curriculum. Chastised by male activists, who argued that sexism was not an important issue, and lacking support from any other movement, Powell, Barrett, and Cade's class was suspended and the organizers moved on to other groups. Using tactics that they had learned from the civil rights movements, women began sharing their stories in "Tell It Like It Is" sessions. These consciousness raising discussions made them realize that their personal experiences were often shared and thus social acts, which if politicized could be transformed into issues that could be solved. This eventually led to the mantra, "The personal is political", which became a rallying idea for joining the Women's Liberation Movement.

In April 1967, Powell married Michael Anthony Dobbins in Birmingham, Alabama. He was a graduate of the Yale School of Architecture and was originally from Denver, Colorado. They would later have two sons. After their marriage, the couple made their home in New York City. Dobbins became one of the founders of the New York Radical Women and wrote Liturgy for the Burial of Traditional Womanhood, for the group's first protest in Arlington National Cemetery in Washington, D.C. She held weekly meetings in her home, where activists explored anthropological and historical studies on matriarchy and biological differences between men and women. Feminist and historian, Rosalyn Baxandall, dubbed Dobbins the "original matriarchist", because of these explorative discussions. New York Radical Women's first national demonstration was to protest the Miss America pageant in 1968 held in Atlantic City, New Jersey. The pageant was targeted because the group saw it as a means of objectifying women, and supported capitalism by selling sponsors' products, militarism because its winners were sent to entertain troops, and racism because all the winners to that point had been White. Demonstrators carried signs and Dobbins, dressed in one of her husband's suits, acted as a Wall Street financier and conducted a mock auction to sell off an effigy of the 1969-model Miss America. The protesters tossed what they called "instruments of torture to women" into a trash can, intent on burning their bras, curlers, girdles, high heels, typing manuals, and popular magazines that promoted sexist ideas, but they were prevented from lighting the trash can on fire by a city ordinance. Dobbins was eventually arrested when she sprayed Toni permanent wave solution around the mayor's box. She used Toni, because it was a sponsor of the pageant, but news media reported that security believed Miriam Bokser, Bev Grant, and Dobbins had released stink bombs. Dobbins was the only one caught and was taken to jail, but the charges were later dropped.

The Atlantic City protest divided activists and eventually led to the demise of New York Radical Women. The split occurred because part of the group thought individuals participating in the Women's Liberation Movement should be able to choose whether they aligned with the right or the left. Others felt that the movement should permanently adhere with the left, but opponents countered that any permanent alignment would result in women's issues being subordinated to other causes. One group that split off included Dobbins, Judy Duffett, Cynthia Funk, Naomi Jaffe, Robin Morgan, Florika Remetier, and others, who formed the Women's International Terrorist Conspiracy from Hell (W.I.T.C.H.). Initially, the women of W.I.T.C.H. did not see men as oppressors of women, but instead saw systems, which consumerized and fetishized women and forced them to accept stereotypical roles in society, as their oppressors. W.I.T.C.H., which could also mean Women Inspired to Tell their Collective History or other creative variations, often used art and street theater to protest against corporate capitalism, the Vietnam War, and the feminine beauty ideal. She joined the Upper West Side Women's Center, where she led conscience-raising groups and organized a food cooperative which distributed goods on a sliding scale, and a childcare cooperative for mothers.

=== Activism (1970–1990) ===
Dobbins returned to her studies at Tulane in 1972 and completed her PhD in sociology in 1974 with a thesis, Unionism, Professionalism, and Feminism among Registered Nurses. That year, she was hired as an assistant professor at the University of Alabama in Tuscaloosa. She introduced a course "Sex, Race, and Class" and in 1980 presented research "Right Wing Attack on the Women's Movement", co-authored with Walda Katz-Fishman, at the 1980 American Sociological Association's women's caucus. The findings led her to protest and in November 1980, she donned a white robe, Adolf Hitler makeup and a mask of Ronald Reagan. She was arrested by police on her way to a Magnolia Park in Birmingham to perform a protest skit, which her husband was going to photograph. The arresting officer charged her with violating "an ordinance designed to prevent masked Ku Klux Klan rallies". She was also charged with assaulting the officer and disorderly conduct. Her husband and another witness testified that the police forcefully put her in the patrol car and refused to answer her question if she was being arrested and for what. Two other witnesses stated that the police used reasonable force in the arrest. The judge hearing the case, dismissed the anti-mask law violation the following month, noting that the ordinance had exceptions for party-goers, public parades, and presentations of educational or religious nature. In January 1981, he found her guilty of assault and disorderly conduct, fining her $250, but Dobbins maintained she did not assault anyone and would appeal. The university fired her because of the protest, according to biographer Barbara Love, but Dobbins stated that the school terminated her after the Fall 1980 semester "in part" because she taught controversial subjects. The first appeal hearing resulted in a mistrial in May 1982, because the jury was deadlocked. The assault and disorderly conduct convictions were upheld in the final appeal hearing in September.

While her first case was pending, Dobbins was arrested again in October 1981 and charged with disorderly conduct for refusing to leave the offices of The Birmingham News. She went to the newspaper office to request that they investigate a story about wiretapping. Although she voluntarily agreed to leave, police officers carried her out of the building to a police car. Dobbins was found guilty of disorderly conduct and fined $200 at the hearing in December. After her termination from the university, Dobbins worked for the NGO Protect America's Children and the National Association for the Advancement of Colored People. She also joined the Communist Party USA and volunteered on civil rights, women's rights, and labor issues. In 1991, Dobbins participated in protests against the Gulf War, stating that people were often too afraid to protest because they might lose their jobs. By the early 1990s, she was teaching at the Job Opportunity and Basic Skills project, which aimed to assist welfare recipients in obtaining employment. She was unanimously hired by the Birmingham City Council in 1992 to serve on the Housing Authority board for a five-year term. Dobbins and her family moved to Atlanta, Georgia in 1996.

== Selected works ==
Dobbins recorded her thoughts and interactions on cassette tapes between 1978 and 1984. The tapes, along with other papers, were donated by Dobbins to the Stuart A. Rose Manuscript, Archives, and Rare Book Library at Emory University in 2016.

- Dobbins, Peggy Powell (July 1977). "Towards a Theory of the Women's Liberation Movement and Women's Wage-Labor". Insurgent Sociologist. 7 (3). Washington, D.C.: American Sociological Association: 53–62. doi:10.1177/089692057700700304. ISSN 0047-0384. OCLC 4632806693.
- Dobbins, Peggy Powell (1981). From Kin to Class: Speculations on the Origins and Development of the Family, Class Society, and Female Subordination (4th ed.). Berkeley, California: Signmaker Press. ISBN 978-0-9605774-0-8.
- Dobbins, Peggy; Dobbins, Mike (September 1997). "Sprawl Things Considered: Controlling Growth". American City & County (112). Shawnee Mission, Kansas: Primedia Business Magazines & Media: 18–. ISSN 0149-337X. OCLC 199661002.
