= Sharon Krebs =

American political activist (1937–2008)

- Sharon Krebs holding an issue of FUNY's quarterly magazine Treason!
- Born: October 13, 1937
- Died: 2008 (aged 70 or 71)
- Education: University of Michigan (BA; MA); Columbia University
- Organizations: Weather Underground; W.I.T.C.H; FUNY
- Political party: Youth International Party
- Criminal charges: Second-degree conspiracy
- Criminal penalty: 4 years imprisonment
- Spouse: Allen Krebs (divorced)
- Partner: Robin Palmer

Sharon L. Krebs (October 13, 1937 – 2008) was an American political activist, member of the feminist group W.I.T.C.H, and co-founder of the Free University of New York. In 1971 she was convicted of second-degree conspiracy for attempting to firebomb a bank in New York City as part of a Weather Underground plot.

== Biography ==
In 1964, Sharon travelled to Cuba with her husband Allen Krebs and their son Thorsten, despite a government travel ban. This resulted in their passports (including that of their five-year-old son) being withdrawn upon their return to JFK Airport. It also caused Allen to lose his teaching position at Adelphi University. Consequently, Sharon and her husband established the Free University of New York in 1965 where she taught Russian literature.

After her divorce from Allen Krebs, Sharon was in a long-term relationship with Robin Palmer, though they never married. Palmer was a member of the Weather Underground and a prolific political activist.

In September 1966, Sharon Krebs was arrested for obstructing the sidewalk on Second Avenue in New York City, where she had set up a table without a peddler's licence in order to sell literature and pins expressing support for the Viet Cong. In September 1967 the charges were dismissed.

Sharon Krebs was fined $50 for engaging in disorderly conduct during the 1968 Columbia University protests. In July 1968, Krebs and 35 others were arrested and charged for incitement to rioting at an Anti-Vietnam War rally, which targeted a fundraising dinner for Vice President Hubert Humphrey. In November 1968, Krebs and her partner Robin Palmer disrupted a Humphrey-Muskie campaign rally by stripping nude and holding up a severed pig's head; a signature move of the radical group known as "the Crazies", whose members were often associated with the Youth International Party or "Yippies".

Krebs joined the staff of the underground newspaper RAT in 1969. Around the same time, she helped to establish the feminist guerrilla theater group known as the Women's International Terrorist Conspiracy from Hell (W.I.T.C.H) with Nancy Kurshan, Robin Morgan and Roz Payne.

=== Arson trial ===
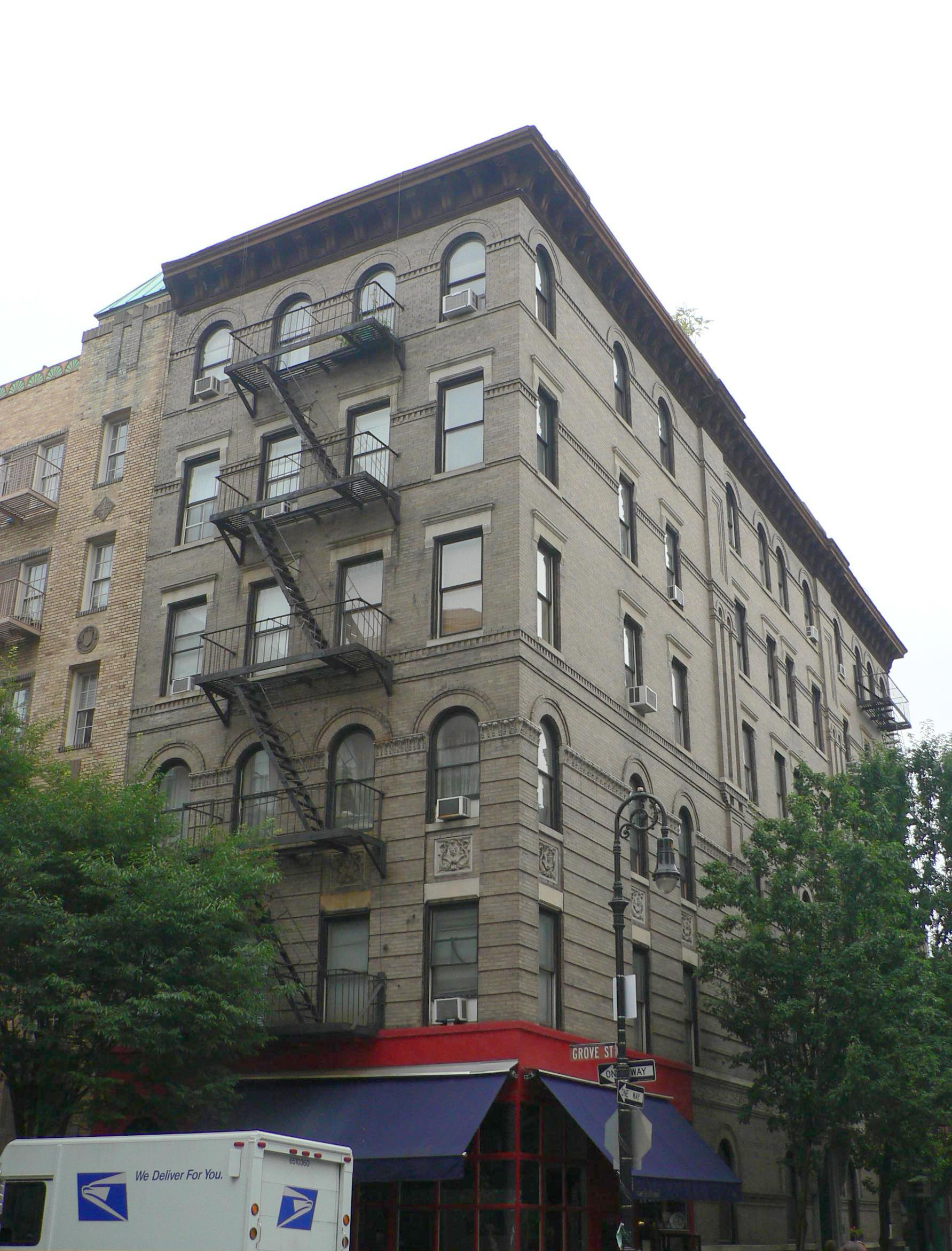
90 Bedford Street, where Krebs was living at the time of the attempted arson attack, is better known for its appearance in the sitcom Friends.

On December 4, 1970, Sharon Krebs was arrested along with five others (Robin Palmer, Joyce Plecha, Claudia Conine, Martin Lewis and Christopher Trenkle) while attempting to carry out the first in a series of planned arson attacks on buildings in New York City. The date of the intended firebombing was chosen as it was the one year anniversary of the killing of Fred Hampton by police in Chicago. The planned targets included 20 Broad Street, which housed the law firm Mudge Rose Guthrie & Alexander (of which Richard Nixon was previously a partner); East Fifth Street police station; a new police station under construction off West Tenth Street; the Bolivian Consulate; the mathematics and science building at New York University; and the First National City Bank at Madison Avenue and 91st Street, where Krebs and the others were caught placing four 1-gallon containers of gasoline and benzene, and were subsequently arrested.

Police were able to foil the attacks as the conspirators had been under surveillance for months, and were trailed by undercover police informant Steve Weiner. Krebs's apartment at 90 Bedford Street in Greenwich Village was raided by police, who recovered multiple items including Viet Cong flags; this building would later become famous for its use in establishing shots in the sitcom Friends.

Krebs was described by her lawyer as a 33‐year‐old divorcee with a 12‐year‐old child, working as a freelance copy editor who had recently completed work for Random House. All of the conspirators pleaded not guilty at their arraignment and denied being members of the Weather Underground, but were nonetheless identified as such by police. On March 8, 1971—the day before their trial was due to start—all of the defendants pleaded guilty to second-degree conspiracy and Krebs was sentenced to a maximum of 4 years in prison. She was incarcerated at Bedford Hills Correctional Facility until her release on November 10, 1972.

=== Later life ===
After serving her prison sentence, Sharon's relationship with Robin Palmer broke down and they separated. She mothered three more children in the years after her release from prison.

In mid-1988 she was interviewed by Joshua Melville, son of Sam Melville, after whom she had named her daughter Samantha. By this point she had remarried and adopted a new surname, and was living in Brooklyn Heights working part-time in a civil litigation firm.

Sharon Krebs died from cancer in 2008.

== Filmography ==
Sharon Krebs was cast as Jane in the 1975 drama film Milestones.
