= Susan Simensky Bietila =

American artist

- Born: 1947 (age 78–79); New York, NY, US
- Education: Brooklyn College
- Alma mater: High School of Music & Art
- Known for: Illustration, puppet-making

Susan (Sue) Simensky Bietila (b. 1947 in New York) is a Milwaukee-based artist whose protest art includes art and illustration for underground newspapers (including RAT and The Guardian) as well as giant street puppets.

She became active as a student in the mid-1960s, when she joined with members of the Women's International Terrorist Conspiracy from Hell (W.I.T.C.H.) to protest a bridal fashion show in New York City; this experience was Bietila's introduction to the power of art and art-making as a political force, and she chronicles the experience in a comic that is available in the This is an Emergency! print portfolio published by Justseeds, as well as on her blog. She has also worked in puppet-making, constructing giant puppets for demonstrations related to Latin American Solidarity.

As an illustrator and designer, Bietila continues to be involved with the collective that publishes WW3 Illustrated. Along with artist Nicolas Lampert, she curated Drawing Resistance, a traveling exhibition of political art that included many WW3 Illustrated artists.

As an artist and activist, Bietila was deeply involved with organizing against the Crandon Mine in Wisconsin in the late 1990s. Her participation in this work includes creation of signs for marches, giant puppets, as well as a series of tombstones that were placed in public locations and which included messages such as "R.I.P. Crandon Mine." These tombstones later became part of an art installation at the Riverwest Art Center in Milwaukee. Simensky then created a poster to celebrate the 28-year struggle to prevent the creation of this mine, as well as a 24-foot mural called "28 years of People Power," created as part of the Seeing Green art show.

Simensky is also active as a curator, including her collaboration on the exhibition "Carlos Cortéz and Allied Artists" at Walker's Point Center for the Arts. This exhibition highlights the work of revolutionary artist Carlos Cortez, as well as artists he influenced.
