= Jane Alpert =

American former far left radical (born 1947)

- Born: Jane Lauren Alpert; May 20, 1947 (age 79); New York City, U.S.
- Education: Swarthmore College
- Occupation: Author
- Criminal charges: Conspiring to bomb a federal building and jumping bail; contempt of court
- Penalty: 27 months in prison; 4 months in prison

Jane Lauren Alpert (born May 20, 1947) is an American former far left radical who conspired in the bombings of eight government and commercial office buildings in New York City in 1969. Arrested when other members of her group were caught planting dynamite in National Guard trucks, she pleaded guilty to conspiracy, but a month before her scheduled sentencing jumped bail and went into hiding.

After four and a half years of wandering the country working at low-level jobs under false names, she surrendered in November 1974 and was sentenced to 27 months in prison for the conspiracy conviction. In October 1977 she was sentenced to an additional four months imprisonment for contempt of court, for refusing to testify at the 1975 trial of another defendant in the 1969 bombings.

During her fugitive years, Alpert saw that the radical left was in decline and began to identify with radical feminism, mailing a manifesto to Ms. magazine, along with a set of her fingerprints to authenticate it. That document, Mother Right: A New Feminist Theory, denounced "the sexual oppression of the left" and detailed her conversion from militant leftist to radical feminist.

== Early life ==
Alpert was born in May 1947 and grew up in the New York City area. Her grandparents, who were Jewish, immigrated from Russia to escape the pogroms. One of her grandfathers gave up his Orthodox faith after coming to America and became a socialist in the 1930s. Jane Alpert's mother graduated from high school at fourteen and then graduated from Hunter College at eighteen. When she was three years old her parents had their second child, Andrew. Andrew was born with several birth defects, including a severed optic nerve that caused him to be legally blind. According to Jane, "Skip (Andrew) survived, with above-average intelligence, but almost blind, with respiratory difficulties and permanently stunted physical growth. I remember him as a large, inert lump who took all my mother's time and attention."

In 1956, her father took a job as vice president of the Linz Glass Company in Uniontown, Pennsylvania. "It was there that Jane Alpert first became aware of the fact that she was an outsider, not only because she was Jewish, but also because she was from the city and unaccustomed to country ways." When she was twelve, they moved back to New York, and she felt like an outsider once again.

Alpert graduated from Forest Hills High School two years before her graduating class and attended Swarthmore College. She continued to do well academically, read constantly, and began to make friends. Among a variety of influential books she read were those of Ayn Rand. Alpert was involved in her first demonstration in the fall of her first year of college. Alpert had attended graduate school at Columbia University but had not been active in the movement there. In April 1968, she became involved in the Strike Committee's Community Action Committee that started the Columbia Tenants Union. The committee attempted to mobilize more community residents to actively resist Columbia's "gentrification" policies.

Alpert attended Swarthmore College, graduating with honors in 1967 after developing an interest in radical politics. She did graduate work at Columbia University but quit after the 1968 student uprising. She wrote for Rat, a New York City underground newspaper, and had become involved with the Black Panther Party by the time she met Sam Melville in 1968. Her autobiography Growing up Underground was published in 1981.

== Sam Melville ==
After graduating from Swarthmore, Alpert took a job as an editor in a publishing firm and started graduate work at Columbia University. Alpert met Sam Melville at the CAC (Community Action Coalition). Melville and Alpert became more involved with politics; they became romantically involved as well, and Alpert moved to the Lower East Side to live with Melville at his apartment. "On the Lower East Side Alpert began writing for Rat." In her book, Alpert says Melville was able to turn insults into compliments. "His voice suggested helpless lust, as though his accusation of wanton sexuality were also an admission of my power over him."

Alpert became drawn into the world of radical politics which she had always watched from the outside. "If Sam had been the most conventional, straight-laced businessman, I would have found his affection hard to resist. The combination of sexual love and radical ideology was more than irresistible. It consumed me. After a few weeks with Sam, it was obvious to me that I was going to quit graduate school." The pair was involved with several bombings, and Alpert wrote several communiqués in 1971 that were released to the press.

Alpert, Melville, and two others were arrested in November 1969. Alpert was released on bail and lived underground while Melville was incarcerated. Alpert learned that Melville was killed at Attica Prison, in New York, in 1971 and wrote an epitaph that was published in the Rat. She wrote: "I no longer had to worry over how much loyalty I owed him or whether I was betraying him when I said, 'I love you,' to another man. ... I could try to feel grateful that he died in a way he would have chosen."

== Bombings ==
Weathermen claimed responsibility for at least twenty bombings between 1970 and 1975. Alpert was involved with several bombings and authored the letters that were released to the press. Alpert was charged with bombing eight government and corporate office buildings during a three-month bombing spree in 1969. Targets included:

- Chase Manhattan
- New York Federal Building
- Standard Oil
- General Motors
- Marine Midland Bank
- Foley Square
- New York City Police Headquarters
- United States Capitol
- United States State Department building
- Armed Forces Induction Center
- New York Corporate Office

Alpert planted a bomb on the floor of the New York Federal Building, which housed U.S. military. Alpert said she felt a sense of hyperawareness surrounding her, and she felt happy and fearful at the same time. Alpert watched the bomb go off from a distant building and felt that the 2 A.M. eruption brought the revolution an inch or two closer. Alpert said: "the bombings had made us the toast of the movement and the talk of all New York. ... Weighed in the balance against the fear of arrest was the anticipated thrill that we would soon be openly celebrated as heroes."

== Relations with members of the Weather Underground Organization ==
When Alpert was arrested in 1969 with Sam Melville and two others in regards to the 1969 bombings, Alpert's parents bailed her out, and with the advice of others, Alpert forfeited the $20,000.00 bail and went underground. Jane Alpert was not arrested for the New York Corporate Office bombing and was still wanted. While underground Alpert got in contact and met with Mark Rudd. While with Rudd, the pair got pulled over by a police officer, but they gave false identification papers and were let off. From there Alpert visited Bernardine Dohrn in San Francisco at the Golden Gate Bridge. The following day, Dohrn and Alpert went to Mt. Tamalpais to speak to a group of women. The two parted ways and Dohrn gave Alpert Kathy Boudin's address. Alpert headed back to the east coast and stopped in Boston to visit Boudin. Although Boudin and Alpert argued over the new left movement. Alpert was impressed with the Weathermen and said, "Nothing was more important to them than staying together."

== Surrender in 1974 ==
As a fugitive, Alpert saw that the radical left was in decline and began to identify with radical feminism, once mailing a feminist manifesto to Ms. magazine along with a set of her fingerprints. After four years of wandering the country working at low-level jobs under false names, she surrendered in November 1974 and was sentenced to 27 months in prison for the conspiracy conviction. In October 1977, she was sentenced to an additional four months imprisonment for contempt of court, for refusing to testify at the 1975 trial of Patricia Swinton, another defendant in the 1969 case.

The New York Times wrote: "Jane Lauren Alpert, who pleaded guilty May 4 to being part of a conspiracy to bomb Federal office buildings here last fall, was declared yesterday to have forfeited her $20,000 bail. The reason was that she violated the conditions of bail by not checking in with the United States Attorney's office this week."

Jane Alpert turned herself in on November 17, 1974, at the Office of the United States Attorney in New York City after being underground for four and a half years. According to The New York Times and TIME magazine, Alpert was sentenced to 27 months in prison for bombing conspiracy and jumping bail. Alpert said that the "plea was not a copout." Jane Alpert's admission of her deviance – inherently part of the act of surrender – was bolstered by her statement that she returned from underground because "it was the right thing to do" Alpert said. "It wasn't a political thing—just a purely pragmatic choice on our part."

Alpert affirmed her ongoing commitment to political activism and did not offer regrets about the actions she had undertaken in the past. She declared that she and her co-conspirators "believed they were acting morally; that if anyone was doing anything concrete to stop the war it was us." Contrary to some reports, Alpert was not a member of the Weather Underground, although she knew several people who were. In Alpert's surrender statement she mentioned work in the feminist movement as a major goal. Alpert also differentiated between her self now and her self then in her surrender statement; she explained her role in the bombings as "craziness", and suggested that her relationship with Sam Melville was a catalyst for her actions.

Alpert acknowledged her feminism, which provided evidence that she would not engage in the same activities now that she did then because of a heightened awareness of power relationships in the male-female interactions. At Alpert's surrender her attorney said, "She is no longer in the grip of the mistaken ideology which caused her to flee; the war is over and the man with whom she was in love and for whom she pleaded guilty is now dead."

== Mother Right (1974) ==
Writes The New York Times reviewer Eden Ross Lipton:

And in November 1974, anticipating the post-Watergate easing of judicial attitudes toward radicals, Jane Alpert turned herself in. She received and served a 27-month jail sentence for the bombing conspiracy and for jumping bail. The radical left reviled her for a tract, Mother Right, that she had written while underground (and in which she had repudiated Sam Melville), and for presumably informing on others, a charge that she has always denied.

Alpert wrote Mother Right: A New Feminist Theory in 1974; her audience was women involved in the Feminist Media. Alpert had been underground for three years when she released her piece for publication. "I regard this piece as a distillation of what I have learned in these three years. The piece describes the process by which I became a feminist, and devotes a fair amount of space to my vision for the future, for you, for myself, for the planet." In Alpert's letter she says that the first part is in the form of an open letter to, "my sister-fugitives in the Weather Underground." The second part of the piece is structured around, "my political/religious vision as a feminist and as a woman." Alpert became a fugitive in May 1970, a few days before her scheduled sentence for conspiracy to bomb military and war related corporate buildings in Manhattan. At that time she was not a member of the Weathermen, and she was never part of SDS (Students for a Democratic Society). "For now, I only want to set the scene of my renewed acquaintance with the Weather Underground by saying that when it occurred, I was decisively through with the left and had, at least mentally, rededicated myself to the cause of a revolution made by and for women."

== Growing Up Underground (1981) ==
Jane Alpert wrote Growing up Underground in 1981. Her book is a confessional memoir wherein she writes about her experiences as a political activist. Alpert wrote the book to set the record straight about her personal role in the bombings of New York City buildings in 1969 and her life underground in the early 1970s. Alpert explains what happened in 1969 and how she got involved in the Weather Underground Organization. She writes about her misunderstood childhood and her account of her life underground. She was supported by her family and friends financially while she lived underground. Mary Moylan wrote a critique of Alpert's book that was published in Jonah Raskin's book, "The Weather Eye" Communiqués from the Weather Underground (1974). Murray Kempton also wrote a critical review of Alpert's book for The New York Review of Books., though the New York Times review offered a dissenting view.
