= Bev Grant =

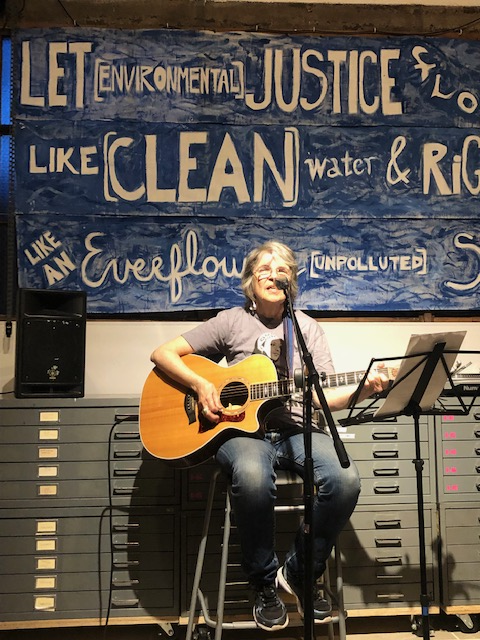
- Bev Grant at a Poor People's Campaign music event at Interference Archive in 2019
- Born: 22 March 1942 (age 84); Portland, Oregon, United States
- Occupations: Musician, activist, photographer, and filmmaker

Bev Grant (born 22 March 1942) is an American musician, photographer, filmmaker, and activist based in New York City.

== Personal life ==
Grant grew up in Portland, Oregon, and moved to New York with her husband in the 1960s. She later separated from her husband, was radicalized through the Anti-War Movement, and became involved in the Women's Movement as an activist, musician, and photographer.

== Music ==
During her childhood in Portland, Grant sang and performed with her two older sisters. After moving to New York City in the 1960s, Grant began performing and writing music in social movements, composing her first parody song for the 1968 Miss America protests in Atlantic City. She was involved throughout the 1970s and 1980s with the band Human Condition, which she helped create in 1972. They performed folk, rock, and world music and played a key role in New York City's underground music scene. Their first album, The Working People Gonna Rise!, was recorded in 1974 with Barbara Dane at Paredon Records. Much of Grant's music writing has focused on the lives and labor conditions of the working poor.

In 1991, Grant joined the United Association of Labor Education Northeast Union Women’s Summer School as cultural director. She is founder and director of the Brooklyn Women's Chorus. From 2006 to 2008, Grant performed with other female musicians as part of a group called Bev Grant and the Dissident Daughters which included singers Angela Lockhart and Carolynn Murphy. After that, she performed with Ina May Wool as WOOL&GRANT until 2015. She released the solo album, It's Personal, in 2017.

== Discography ==
- It's Personal (2017)
- I Will Sing (2015), with Brooklyn Women's Chorus
- Wool & Grant (2013), by Ina May Wool and Bev Grant as Wool & Grant
- Singing Clear: Clean Earth, Air, Water 'Round Here (2012), Various Artists
- The Power of Song (2003), with Brooklyn Women's Chorus
- We Were There! Songs of Women's Labor History (2002)
- In Tune (1994)

== Photography ==
Much of Grant's alternative-press photography documents political organizing events Grant attended, and occasionally participated in, from approximately 1968 until 1972, after which point she focused more extensively on her music career. Included in her documentary photographs are images of the Black Panther Free Breakfast Program, the Jeannette Rankin Brigade March on Washington, the 1968 Filmore East Takeover, and of Fidel Castro speaking on the occasion of the 10th Anniversary of the Cuban Revolution. Some of her early photographs were published in underground newspapers and distributed through Liberation News Service; many have been distributed by Getty Images and were featured in a solo exhibition in 2018 at Osmos Gallery in New York City.

Grant's photography depicts her own activism and her involvement with New York Radical Women. Her documentation of the 1968 Miss America Protests was featured in her 2018 solo exhibition at Osmos; these photographs have become widely popular and are Grant's best known work. Her press pass allowed her to take photographs inside the pageant itself, where protesters unfurled banners and released stink bombs. Grant's photography was used in making the film She's Beautiful When She's Angry, released in 2015.

== Film ==
As a member of Newsreel, Grant caught several important events on film, including the 1968 Miss America pageant for the Newsreel film Up Against the Wall Ms. America. Her work as an activist and filmmaker gave her contacts within, and filming access to, groups including the Young Lords, the Black Panther Party, and the Poor People's Campaign. She contributed the theme song to the 1971 film, Janie's Janie, which is considered "an important early film of the women's movement."

== Activism ==
As an activist, Grant attended her first anti-war demonstrations in New York City and was radicalized at a meeting of Students for a Democratic Society at Princeton in 1967. Grant was a member of New York Radical Women, and she participated in and photographed a wide range of related political events including the 1968 demonstrations against the Miss America pageant in Atlantic City and the October 31, 1968 hex on Wall Street by Florika Remetier, Peggy Dobbins, Susan Silverman, Judith Duffett, Ros Baxandall, and Cynthia Funk of W.I.T.C.H., the Women’s International Terrorist Conspiracy from Hell.

Grant has articulated the important connection between the Civil Rights Movement and the Women's Movement she took part in, noting that many women's liberation organizers had participated in Civil Rights organizing and brought valuable skills and knowledge from that work. Her conceptualization of the way women's oppression as a result of larger oppressions led to her later activism as an anti-imperialist.

== Awards and exhibitions ==
- 2006 Honorary BAXten Arts and Artists in Progress Award for work as director of Brooklyn Women's Chorus.
- 2017 Joe Hill Award from the Labor Heritage Foundation in recognition of Grant's artistic work in support of labor organizing.
- 2017 ASCAP Jay Gorney songwriter award for the song "We Were There".
- Grant's song “Inez” is included in the Smithsonian/Folkways “Best of Broadside” collection.
- 1968 from the Bev Grant Archive, Osmos Gallery 2018, was the first solo exhibition of Grant's documentary photographs.
