= Novgorod case =

Criminal case in Russia

The Novgorod Case was a criminal case in Russia from 2007 to 2024, notable both for its public resonance in 2007-2008 and for the length of time during which the defendant and the presumed victim (mother and daughter) were wanted, found alive after having disappeared for 15 years.

The case involved Antonina Martynova (formerly Fyodorova, née Stepanova) from Veliky Novgorod, born in 1985. She was charged with attempted murder while trying to murder her then 2-year-old daughter, Alisa, in February 2007, by throwing her into the stairwell. The sole witness was an 11-year-old boy. Antonina and her defence have claimed that the girl fell by accident.

Antonina was prosecuted under Articles 30.3 ("Preparations for a Crime, and Attempted Crimes") and 105.2 ("Murder") of the Criminal Code of the Russian Federation (CC-RF). (CC-RF henceforth; these links and other Code(s) links below are for the English translation(s) of the latest versions of the Code(s), those currently in force in Russia).

The case sparked extensive public debate in Russian media, online communities, and blogs, with a large-scale campaign in support of Antonina's innocence. Discussions began in April 2007 with a post on the Russian-language blog of Antonina's domestic partner (later her second husband), Kirill Martynov (LiveJournal user "hvil").

In July 2008 a closed trial was held, at which a panel of jurors found the defendant guilty. However, Martynova–Fyodorova failed to appear at the next hearing where she was expected to be sentenced and incarcerated, disappeared together with her daughter, and remained on the wanted list for 15 years and 8 months.

In the spring of 2024 Antonina Martynova was detained by police in Stavropol. Her daughter Alisa, by then aged 19, had been living with her, and later testified in her defence. The proceedings resumed from the same stage at which they had been interrupted 15 years earlier.

On 7 May 2024 the Novgorod Regional Court found Martynova guilty and sentenced her to nine years’ imprisonment. On 19 September of the same year, the First Court of Appeal of General Jurisdiction reduced the sentence to eight years and replaced the actual prison term with a suspended sentence (with a probation period of four years), releasing Antonina (who had by then divorced her second husband and reverted to the surname Fyodorova) from custody.

== Background ==
The term "Novgorod Case" was first used by the Russian news agency REGNUM on April 20, 2007. The main events of the case took place in the city of Veliky Novgorod, Russia.

Antonina, 22 and temporarily unemployed, was taking care of her daughter, Alisa, born in 2004 to Antonina's first marriage. Her husband, Kirill Martynov, is a journalist and was at the time, a lecturer of Philosophy at the Higher School of Economics in Moscow.

Until mid-August 2007, the investigation was conducted by the Major Case Investigator Vladimir Vladimirovich Kolodkin, of Veliky Novgorod (MCI or MCI Kolodkin henceforth).

== Timeline ==
=== 2007 ===
Amateur incident re-creation at place of Alisa's fall. This shot is taken from a claimed position of the witness.

On February 26, Alisa fell down two floors of a stairwell in the building where her grandmother lives, in Veliky Novgorod. An 11-year-old boy, a friend of a neighbor's son, witnessed the fall. The boy allegedly stood on the landing one floor above. He reported to the neighbors that he had seen "an older girl push a younger one down". Antonina claims it was an accident.

See versions of the events as seen by the prosecution and the defense below.

The mother and daughter were rushed to the hospital in an ambulance. A medical examination revealed that Alisa sustained a concussion and some damage to her jaw, lost four teeth and had minor bruises. During the examination, the police had Antonina make a written testimony of the events.

On March 16, Antonina was visited by a police officer who brought her an official summons to testify as a witness in an inquiry into Alisa's fall. According to Kirill, the officer also said that Antonina's actions constitute a corpus delicti under Article 105 of CC-RF ("Murder").

On March 18, Antonina's defence was taken up by Konstantin Pakin. According to Kirill, Pakin only agreed to take the case on strict non-disclosure terms and intimated he would drop it immediately if it were to attract too much public attention. On March 19, the MCI Kolodkin took the testimony of Antonina and Antonina underwent an independent polygraph ("lie detector") test on March 20 on the advice of Pakin.

On March 22, the MCI officially opened a criminal investigation under Articles 30.3 ("Intentional actions (inaction) by the person concerned, directed expressly towards the commission of a crime") and 105.1 ("Murder") of CC-RF.

On March 23, a member of the Public Chamber of Russian Federation, Aleksey Chadayev, filed an official request with the Office of the Novgorod City Public Prosecutor, for the attention of Novgorod City Prosecutor Andrey Yefimov. In the request, Chadayev demanded that all those case materials not covered by official investigation secretly be delivered to the Public Chamber Committee on Relations with Regions and Police Authorities.

On March 26, the President of the Union of Writers of Russia, Valery Ganichev, wrote a letter to the Governor of the Novgorod Region, Mikhail Prusak. The letter stated that Antonina and Kirill have a healthy relationship and asked the governor to pay special attention to the case. Ganichev subsequently received a reply from the Novgorod City Hall that his letter had been forwarded to the Office of the Novgorod City Public Prosecutor.

On March 27, the MCI filed a request with the Novgorod Office of Children's Services demanding that "the child be taken away with immediate effect under Article 77 of the Family Code of Russia", attaching a copy of the case-opening decision to the said request. According to Kirill Martynov, he then called the Office of Children's Services personally and said the following: "Fyodorova has confessed to the attempted murder of her daughter. Take the child away." The same day, Pakin dropped the case because the involvement of the Public Chamber made it public.

According to an anonymous source in the Office of the Novgorod City Public Prosecutor quoted by A. Letyagin, a journalist, "that same day the girl was taken from her mother by the Office of Children's Services and delivered to her other relatives". Kirill Martynov denied that the said event ever took place.

On March 30, the Office of Children's Services received the MCI's request and attempted to take Alisa away without having procured either a court decision or a decision by the city authorities.

On April 6, Antonina received an official summons to appear at the Office of the Novgorod City Public Prosecutor on April 9. The same day, Vladimir Baydyuk, another investigator turned lawyer, dropped the case, declaring that Antonina's guilt is, as he sees it, evidence beyond a reasonable doubt. Kirill and Antonina then found a new lawyer, who agreed to take on the case.

On April 9, Antonina appeared at the Office of the Novgorod City Public Prosecutor to testify. According to Kirill Martynov, the interrogators "threatened" her with changing the CC-RF article under which she was to be prosecuted from the original Article 105.1 to Article 105.2, calling the latter "a death penalty article".

On April 13, Antonina signed a written agreement not to leave the City of Novgorod.

On April 18, Antonina was subjected to a complex psychological and psychiatric examination, conducted by psychiatrists and an expert psychologist of the Regional Psychoneurological Clinic of Novgorod. The examination decision was that Antonina does not suffer from any kind of psychological disorder now, nor did she suffer from any during the events leading to her being prosecuted.

On April 19, officials presented Antonina with the charges under Article 30.3 and Article 105.2, item c) ("Murder of a person who is known by the killer to be in a helpless state") of the CC-RF.

At 4:30 PM on the same day, the Novgorod City Court issued an official decision for the measure of restriction as incarceration. The MCI motivated its incarceration request by writing that Antonina "is charged with an especially grave crime, is currently unemployed, is constantly in contact with her underage daughter, and is living on the same premises with her, so that she is in position to commit other acts of violence involving her child. Furthermore, the gravity of the charges is such that one can reasonably suspect the accused of an intent to escape from the authorities and thus to obstruct the justice".

However, the Article 108 ("Taking into custody") of the Criminal Procedure Code of Russia stipulates that incarceration is only to be chosen as a measure of restriction "if it is impossible to apply a different, milder measure of restriction". Antonina was arrested the same day.

In the evening, Kirill Martynov published the first public notice about the case in his LiveJournal blog.

On April 20, comments in Kirill's blog and the blogs of his family friends hit the top list of the Russian search engine Yandex, which enumerates the most popular Russian blog posts based on the number of links given to these posts in other people's blogs.

That same day, Regnum, a Russian news agency, used the phrase "Novgorod case", referring to the case in question, for the first time in the history of the case.

A LiveJournal community called novgorod_delo was created. A popular journalist, TV personality and blogger Maxim Kononenko stopped running his political anecdote blog. Kononenko replaced the usual messages on the blog with information about the case. Many other public figures published their comments on the case online.

The defence filed a complaint against Antonina's incarceration at the Novgorod Regional Court under Article 108.11 (right to appeal decisions on selection of measures of restriction) of the Criminal Procedure Code of Russia. The court hearing of the complaint took place on May 8 (see below).

On April 21, the NTV channel aired a feature called "Particularly dangerous" on organized crime in Novgorod and its connections to the administration of Novgorod Region. This broadcast initiated a discussion of the issue "Novgorod is Russia's national preserve for crime" as part of Antonina's defence campaign.

On April 22, a Novgorod City Duma deputy, Aleksandr Deyna, sent a request for information to the Novgorod City Prosecutor Yefimov.

The same day, news about Antonina's arrest began to appear in various online media and other news agencies; the headlines were often misleading, stating that the mother attempted to kill the child. Kirill asked many of his journalist colleagues to replace the existing headlines with neutral ones. In some cases, he threatened journalists with lawsuits against them. Some members of novgorod_delo community also monitored news about the case.

On April 23, Yegor Kholmogorov appeared on Radio Mayak with a report on the case. On the same day, National News Agency published an article by Aleksey Koryakov, a journalist. Koryakov supported the point of view of the prosecution and accused the LiveJournal community of "attempts to pressure the jury".

On April 24, a Russian State Duma deputy A.V. Chuyev was presented with a letter describing the case. The defence signed a contract with a new lawyer, Konstantin Rybalov.

On April 25, an official reply of MCI Kolodkin to the deputy Deyna's request for information arrived in the mail. The New Novgorod Newspaper published a page-size article by Aleksey Koryakov which, again, supported in every detail the point of view of the prosecution. Later, Koryakov apologized to Antonina and published another article.

On April 26, the defence lawyer filed an official appeal to the director of the prison where Antonina was incarcerated. The appeal focused on the complaints about the poor state of her health. Kirill Martynov published a dummy for a letter to the Office of Prosecutor General of Russia in his blog. Many people subsequently used this dummy to send letters.

The novgorod_delo community launched a campaign to give support to Antonina, which ran in late April – early May. People all over the world sent numerous letters, telegrams and faxes to the prison.

On April 27, the defence lawyer filed a request at the Office of Novgorod Region Public Prosecutor. The request demanded to repeal the incarceration decision under Article 110 ("Cancellation or Change of a Measure of Restriction") of the Criminal Procedure Code of Russia. Furthermore, the request asked to close the criminal case as there is no corpus delicti in Antonina's actions. On April 28, a press conference organized by Maxim Kononenko, Aleksey Chadayev and Kirill Martynov took place in Novgorod in text and video form.

On April 29, a website on the Novgorod Case appeared on the Internet.

On May 2, the Public Chamber Committee for Protection of the Rights of Children published a statement on the Novgorod Case.

On May 4, the investigator has the defence lawyer Rybalov sign an agreement of non-disclosure of pre-investigation information. The investigators conduct investigative actions in the house where the original event took place. Antonina participates in these actions.

Kirill Martynov states publicly that "the Novgorod attorneys who have been working with us bear a large part of responsibility for the situation that we have now."

On May 5, NTV TV-channel devotes a part of its evening news broadcast to the case text and video.

On May 6, a Novgorod NGO "Regional Center for Human Rights" publishes a statement about "Novgorod case". In the evening, another lawyer joins the defence team.

On May 7, the Novgorod Case becomes the subject of the "Morning page" broadcast on Echo of Moscow. In the evening, Antonina was released from the prison after signing an agreement not to leave the City of Novgorod; the reason for the release was a decision Novgorod City Prosecutor Yefimov. Kirill Martynov wrote in his blog about Antonina's health. According to Kirill, she suffered from a severe cold and acute heart pain while in prison. Upon exiting, she had some gray hair. Antonina also lost weight and weighed only 36 kilos at the time when Kirill reported on her health.

On May 8, Novgorod Regional Court repealed the Novgorod City Court decision that put Antonina in prison; the Regional Court decision stated that the City Court did not have sufficient reasons for changing the original measure of restriction for incarceration, and that it committed breaches of the Criminal Procedure Code of Russia in effectuating this change.

On the same day, new messages appeared in Antonina's blog. She told her readers that it was now illegal for her to visit Alisa without a presence of an official representative of the child (that is, Alisa's father and Antonina's ex-husband).

On May 13, Antonina published online a video in which she addressed the LiveJournal users who supported her.

On May 16, the defence filed a complaint at the Office of the Novgorod City Public Prosecutor, appealing against the decision that forbade Antonina to visit her daughter. The same day, the First channel airs a program titled "Let Them Talk", one part of which dealt with the "Novgorod case".

A Novgorod City Court session was scheduled for May 25 to hear a defence complaint against Kolodkin's actions, but it was postponed because of Antonina's absence (health reasons). The complaint concerned the investigator's denial to join a number of defence's documents and statements to the case. This denial was repealed a day before, on May 24, by a decision of the office of Novgorod City Public Prosecutor.

On May 30, the Novgorod City Court issued a decision on the complaint. The Court refused to consider the investigator's actions to be illegal, alluding to the May 24 decision of the Office of Novgorod City Public Prosecutor, which, in the court's opinion, made void the matter at issue of the complaint.

On May 31, Antonina received a letter from the office of Novgorod City Public Prosecutor with a decision that repealed the interdict to visit her daughter.

On June 4, the defence filed a moral damage suit against the Office of Novgorod City Public Prosecutor, at the Novgorod City Court. On the same day, Antonina underwent an outpatient psychological examination.

On June 8, Kolodkin, while on an official business trip to Moscow, attempted to approach and arrange interviews with those witnesses for the defence who live in Moscow. In the next few days, he collected the evidence from witnesses.

On June 9, the defence filed a request challenging the investigator and demanding an inquiry into his actions, as there were suspicions of constituting a fraud (use of forged documents).

On the same day, an investigation team was officially formed in Novgorod. On June 13, the investigation team conducted searches in Antonina's room and apartment. The investigators took Antonina's and Alisa's medical documents, an official report on the results of Antonina's polygraph test (made and signed by Olga Belyushina, an expert in polygraph detector data interpreting), Antonina's poems, her letters from the prison, empty floppy disks, etc. The defence feared that the evidence collected may be tampered with.

On June 14, Aleskey Chadayev published on LiveJournal an account of his interview with Kolodkin.

On June 18 and June 20, the official responses of the Office of Novgorod Region Public Prosecutor to the defence's complaints were received in the mail. The dates of the reposes were June 7 and June 9. The replies state that "the inquiry revealed there no breaches of law were committed during the investigation" and that the investigation team "is considering all versions of the event, including the version concerning an accident". Kirill Martynov published a message telling his readers about his intention to file a complaint against the replies at the office of the Prosecutor General of Russia. The complaint is to contain the list of the breaches of law committed by the investigator and also the list of his other actions that constitute a corpus delicti under several articles of CC-RF.

On June 25, the Novgorod City Court turned down the moral damage suit, indicating a formal reason: the suit papers did not mention the home address of the investigator Kolodkin. On the same day, the pre-investigation was prolonged until July 22.

On June 26, Antonina received a letter with a written refusal of a temporary permission for her to leave Novgorod to Moscow in order to take the entry exams into Moscow State University. The refusal bears the date of June 24, while the application for the permission was filed on June 18.

On June 27, the mail delivered another refusal: this time, the refusal of the challenge to the investigator, dated June 18.

On July 4, Kirill and Antonina got married in Novgorod. Antonina took her husband's last name.

On July 13, Kolodkin began a series of attempts to interrogate Alisa. Over the next few days, he sent several summons to Alisa's maternal and paternal grandmothers.

On July 17, the Novgorod City Prosecutor Yefimov announced his intention to re-examine the case and re-issue the charges against Antonina. On the same day, the term of the pre-investigation was prolonged by another month.

On July 27, a new message in the novgorod_delo community told the readers that the protective railing from the scene of the event was removed by a saw and taken to the office of the investigator for an investigative experiment with Alisa's participation. The Martynovs refused to allow Alisa to participate in an experiment or interrogation, fearing that the child will be adversely affected by the experience. The Children's Services supported their refusal.

On July 31, the investigator issued a decision to arrange an inpatient psychiatric examination of Antonina on the premises of the Moscow Serbsky Institute for Social and Forensic Psychiatry and passed this decision to the Novgorod City Court for approval. The term of the investigation was prolonged one more time, until September 22. The defence believed that the very fact that the investigator calls for a re-examination qualifies as unequivocal evidence that it is impossible to prove that Alisa's fall was an attempt at murder.

The court hearing of the said decision was scheduled for August 1. However, it was called off because of the absence of the defence's lawyer, who received the summons too late. The session was rescheduled for August 13. The court officials attempted to bar the press from attending the session. Antonina filed a complaint against the investigator's late issue of summons to her lawyer under Article 125 ("Court Procedure for Considering Complaints") of the Criminal Procedure Code of Russia. This complaint was heard by the Novgorod City Court on August 9 (see below).

On August 3, a Russian State Duma deputy Yevgeny Royzman received a reply from the Office of the Prosecutor General of Russia to his inquiry, dated July 7. The reply stated, among other matters, that Kolodkin was punished for breaches of the Criminal Procedure Code of Russia articles concerning the arrest of the suspect (by way of his quarterly bonus for 3rd quarter 2007 being called off). The reply also states that the Novgorod City Prosecutor and his deputy were reprimanded officially for their lack of due prosecutor supervision.

On August 9, the Novgorod City Court rejected Antonina's complaint against the investigator's actions.

On August 13, the Novgorod City Court approved the decision of the Office of Novgorod City Public Prosecutor to arrange an inpatient psychiatric examination. The defence planned to appeal this decision at the Novgorod Regional Court. The Russian TV company Triada sent its team to film the session, but the court officials did not allow journalists to enter the court.

On August 14, the Head of Public Chamber Committee for Protection of Children's Rights, O.V. Zykov, filed a request at the Office of the Prosecutor General of the Russian Federation, demanding that the Prosecutor General Yu. Ya. Chaika inquire into the legality of the latest decisions of the investigation and other issues pertaining to the prosecution of Antonina Martynova.

On August 22, the case went to another investigator, A. V. Yashin.

On August 27, Yashin met with the accused. He insisted that Antonina should submit to several medical tests in preparation for her medical evaluation at the Serbsky Institute. Yashin stated this in spite of the fact that the court decision for the hospitalization was not legally in force and was yet to be appealed in Novgorod Regional Court. The Office of Novgorod City Public Prosecutor threatened Antonina with another incarceration if she refuses to submit to testing.

On September 6, Yashin released the case to the Office of Novgorod City Public Prosecutor, which then delivered it to the newly created Investigation Committee. The Investigative Committee under the Prosecution Office was created on 1 August 2007 by the Presidents executive order N1004.

On September 7, Kirill Martynov filed a request at the Office of Novgorod City Public Prosecutor, demanding to initiate criminal proceedings against the Novgorod City Prosecutor A.A. Yefimov, his deputy D.S. Mikhailov, and V.V. Kolodkin under Article 299 (attempt to knowingly prosecute an innocent person) of CC-RF.

On September 10, the name of the current investigator of the Novgorod case, Dina Palchuk, was announced.

On September 11, the Novgorod Regional Court refused the appeal against the Novgorod City Court decision to conduct an inpatient psychiatric examination of Antonina at Moscow Serbsky Institute, thus upholding the decision. On the same day, Maksim Kononenko stopped updating his blog again, replacing recent messages with an update on the recent turn of events in the Novgorod case.

On September 12, Antonina arrived in Moscow in order to undergo an inpatient examination. The examination was postponed and was due to start on September 17.

The Head of Public Chamber Committee for Protection of Children's Rights O.V. Zykov published a statement on the recent developments in the case entitled, "It began as a farce, but now it is turning into a tragedy".

On September 17, Antonina arrived at the Moscow Serbsky Institute in order to undergo an inpatient examination. The examination concluded on October 11 after which Antonina returned home and met her daughter.

On December 17, Kirill Martynov appealed to the media. The next day Antonina was supposed to obtain refiled charges.

On December 20, the investigation was formally ended. Antonina obtained the final charges.

On December 21, Antonina and her defence started to examine case before forwarding it to court. Later Kirill insisted that the case lacks any evidence of the motive and the video of the boy's testimony filmed in May 2007 is significantly different than the drawn statement. He also claimed that the latter were obtained with misleading questions. The investigator Palchuk denied coping the video testimony.

On December 21–24, the community "Novgorod case" organized a petition drive. The petition asked the Russian President Vladimir Putin to direct the attention of the Prosecutor General's Office of the Russian Federation (General'naya Procuratura) to the situation around the case and to enforce the checking of the process violation mentioned in the petition. According to the replies which arrived in January 2008, some petitions were forwarded to the Novgorod Regional Prosecutor's office (Regional Procuratura), and some to the Prosecutor General's Office.

=== 2008 ===
On January 9, a statement by Kirill Martynov was filed to the Novgorod Procuratura officially. The statement claimed that prosecution of Antonina was illegal. It was later redirected by the city procuror to the Investigative Committee. The Committee did not accept it for consideration. Later, this rejection was appealed in the city court which dismissed the motion.

On January 10, a motion was filed in the city court to overturn the denial to provide videocopy of the boy's testimony. The motion was dismissed on January 14.

On January 23 Antonina and her defence finished examining the case materials. The defence subsequently filed several motions.

On January 29 the case was sent to the prosecutor's office to approve the charges. However, it was returned for an additional investigation. Martynovs found out about this only in the beginning of March.

Information regarding dissemination of flyers about the "Novgorod Case", was published on March 14 by the Novgorod Regional Human Rights Center.

On March 26, the website of the Novgorod Regional office of the Investigative Committee published an appeal to media requesting to avoid publishing any defence opinions without comments of prosecutors. The motivation was that "dissemination and analysis [...] of one-sided opinions [...] without using official case documents, as it often happens, is biased and plays a significant role in creation of the negative public opinion about the law-enforcement agencies". The appeal mentioned the possible criminal prosecution for ignoring this request.

On April 16, a newspaper Rossijska gazeta published an article by Vladimir Bogdanov that was biased towards the prosecution. Lately, a libel suit was filed against the newspaper and Bogdanov. The working committee for the child protection of the Public Chamber passed a resolution regarding the publication.

On April 17, Antonina received the filed charges which were transferred to court on April 18.

On May 13 a preliminary hearing took place, and the prosecution asked for closed court hearing. The motion was sustained. The suspect's husband asked the media to make this fact public. The court's decision about closing the process was appealed on May 23.

On May 21, the Public Chamber of the Russian Federation held hearings about the "Novgorod Case".

On June 24, the TV show People's world (First Channel) hosted by N. N. Drozdov discussed the "Novgorod Case". The boy who eye-witnessed the alleged murder attempt was shown on the TV for the first time. The material was filmed in Novgorod at the beginning of September 2007.

On May 19, a signature collection drive started in Moscow, Saint-Petersburg, Voronezh and two other cities. The drive started online on June 9. The number of online signatures exceeded a thousand in three days. The petition asked Russian President Medvedev to look into the situation around the criminal prosecution of Antonina and to protect her constitutional rights. On June 24, the signatures were given to the President's administration. On June 19 and June 24, the jury was selected for the case.

The hearing in the Supreme Court of the Russian Federation was scheduled on July 30 to discuss the motion about the closing of the process for public. However, the motion was dismissed. According to the Article 236 of the Code of Criminal Procedure, a court's decision in the preliminary hearings cannot be stricken down. Despite the fact that the Constitutional Court of the Russian Federation previously overturned this prohibition in several cases as infringement on the constitutional rights, similar cases were not heard in the Constitutional Court before.

On July 2–22, closed hearings took place in Novgorod.

On July 24, the jury by 11 votes of 12 pronounced Antonina guilty in the murder attempt without extenuating circumstances.

On July 26, Antonina posted the last entries to her blog about her daughter's birthday.

On July 28 and July 29, Antonina didn't appear before the court where the verdict results were to be discussed. Her husband stated that both she and her daughter are missing since the night of July 27, and he knows nothing about their location. The court changed Martynova's measure of restriction to arrest in her absence. Hearing of the case was suspended.

On August 7, official retrieval of Antonina was announced in Novgorod region; on August 18 it was announced at the federal level.

== What happened: the version of the prosecution ==
The prosecution's version of events is as follows: (Note: This section is a slightly abridged version of Kolodkin's official reply to the official request for information filed by Novgorod City Duma deputy Aleksandr Deyna. The full text of the said reply in Russian is published in Deyna's blog (the record in question is dated April 25, 2007))

The pre-investigation revealed that on February 26, 2007, about 9AM, Antonina Fyodorova proceeded to carry out the premeditated murder of her three-year-old daughter Alisa, who was a hindrance to her mother's private life. At this time, she took Alisa from her apartment (No. 31, located on the second floor of 26 Kosmonavtov Street, where they are officially registered) to the staircase landing.

Thinking that no witnesses to her actions are present in the stairwell, Antonina proceeded to stage an accidental fall of her daughter from the third-floor landing. As Alisa's mother, Antonina was fully aware of her daughter's young age. Therefore, Antonina was sure that the three-year-old was incapable either of completely understanding the criminal intent of her mother or of putting up a fight against her. Antonina, intending to kill her daughter, pushed Alisa through the metal bars of the railing of the stairwell in such a manner that Alisa found herself beyond the zone of safety. In the next few seconds, Antonina held Alisa by the hands, and then, so as to continue the implementation of her criminal design and fulfill it, Antonina let Alisa go, thus actually throwing her daughter down the stairwell. These actions resulted in Alisa's falling down the stairwell and in Alisa's body and head's hitting the stone floor of the ground floor landing.

However, Antonina was ultimately unable to complete her premeditated crime due to circumstances outside of her control. The fall failed to result in Alisa's death, though she hit the stone floor. She sustained the following body injuries: a lower jaw fracture (left side), a full dislocation of three teeth, a concussion, some abrasions to her chin, and a bruise in the groin (right side). These body injuries are classified to be of medium severity because they led to a prolonged incapacitation of the victim amounting to no less than three weeks.

After the initial inquiry into the event, on March 22, 2007, the Office of Novgorod City Public Prosecutor officially opened a criminal case No. 9973 against Antonina Fyodorova, under Articles 30.3 and 105 of CC-RF.

Antonina was officially interrogated as a suspect on April 9, 2007. As a restriction measure, the investigation ordered her to sign a written undertaking stating that she is not to leave the city of Novgorod.

During the initial inquiry and later during the interrogations, both as a suspect and as an accused, Antonina was unable to produce a coherent version of the events. According to the prosecution, her evidence was garbled and inconsistent.

Antonina's guilt in the committing the said crime is proved beyond reasonable doubt by the evidence provided by an eyewitness, a minor (an 11-year-old boy who, during the event, stood on the third floor landing), who witnessed the criminal actions as they were being committed.

== What happened: the version of the defence ==
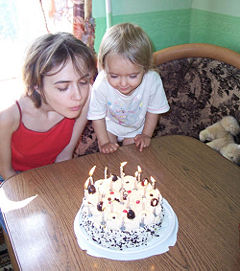
Antonina and Alisa on Alisa's birthday on July 26, 2006. This photo has figured prominently on Russian websites starting in April 2007.

=== Background ===
Antonina is originally from Veliky Novgorod. Her mother Ninel Stepanova, Antonina, and Alisa were officially registered as living in a room at a Veliky Novgorod hostel. However, since October 2006 Antonina and Alisa lived in Moscow with Kirill Martynov. The young woman and her child traveled to Novgorod on February 2 to visit Ninel and to collect Antonina's high school diploma from the Novgorod State University. Antonina intended to apply to the undergraduate program of Faculty of Philosophy at Moscow State University later in the summer. Antonina and Alisa did not plan a prolonged stay in Novgorod, but because Alisa fell ill, the mother and daughter were forced to remain there.

=== The accident ===
On the February 26 at 9AM, Ninel left for work. The family decided to leave the front door unlocked because the neighbors' children usually come home from school around noon and have a habit of kicking the door and disturbing Alisa's afternoon nap. On February 25, the day before the event, the family had an argument with these kids. They had been using swear words and speaking loudly, and Alisa heard them. The kids were asked to behave, but they reacted negatively to this.

After Ninel left for work, Alisa sat in the room eating candy. Antonina went to the bathroom to brush her teeth. When she came back, the child was missing. Antonina ran to the staircase landing looking for Alisa. She saw her daughter squeeze herself between the bars of the railing.

The staircase landings in that building are wide, so it was difficult for Antonina to catch her daughter in time before Alisa fell through the bars. Alisa fell two floors, from the third-floor landing down to the first floor. Antonina ran down the steps and called an ambulance, and she and Alisa were rushed off to the hospital.

An 11-year-old boy, a friend of a neighbor's son, was standing on the landing one floor above when the fall occurred. He ran to the neighbors and told them that "one little girl pushed another down". This evidently prompted the neighbors to call the police. The police came to the hospital and interrogated Antonina, who was still in the state of a shock, while her child was undergoing a medical examination.

After three days in the hospital, the administration stated that there was not enough room for Alisa and Antonina and suggested that they should go home. At the time when the family left the hospital, the physicians declared Alisa's injuries to be of medium severity (because of a jaw fracture). Antonina and Alisa did not go back to Moscow since the mother was afraid that the little girl was still unfit for such a journey. Besides, Alisa's health insurance covered her only in Novgorod, and Alisa's relatives who lived in Novgorod wanted to help the family while the little girl convalesced. Antonina loathed the idea of going back to the building where the accident took place, so she and Ninel rented an apartment in the Novgorod suburbs.

=== The aftermath of the accident ===
Three weeks after the accident, Antonina and Alisa were getting ready to go back to Moscow. Antonina's March 18 birthday was approaching, and she wanted to celebrate it in Moscow, and Alisa had recovered and was fit for travel. However, on March 16, a policeman presented Antonina with official court summons. The written summons called on her "to testify as a witness". However, the policeman told Antonina that his colleagues found a corpus delicti in her actions and that they firmly believed it was not an accident and that she was going to be prosecuted under Article 105 of CC-RF (that is, for murder).

Kirill Martynov testified on March 19, stating that the information about the family's unstable financial situation is false. As evidence, he brought bank slips certifying to his having sent money to Antonina on February 26 and March 9. Before that, the prosecution stressed that Antonina was an unemployed single mother who lacked means of sustenance. The defence, however, claimed that Kirill firmly backed the family financially and enabled Antonina to devote all her time to her daughter. According to the witnesses, Alisa calls Kirill "Daddy".

At first, the documents produced by the defence were officially added to the case, as the investigator informed the defence lawyer in an oral conversation. A few days later, however, the prosecution removed these documents from the case and issued an official decision rejecting these.

=== The Position of the Defense ===
From the beginning, the defense has said that the case had been fabricated and that there is plenty of evidence to corroborate this point of view. According to the defence:

- Antonina has no motive to kill her daughter. Alisa was in no way "a hindrance to her mother's private life", as the investigator Kolodkin claimed. Even after assuming that she was a hindrance, Antonina's ex-husband was willing and able to assume Alisa's custody at any time.
- The investigation has paid attention only to the testimony of the only eyewitness, who, at the age of 11, is a minor. The investigation has ignored other documents and testimonies provided by the defence, such as descriptions of Antonina's character. The investigation also refused to add to the case a number of family photos taken before the accident. As any outside observer can attest, these photos demonstrate this is a happy family.
- The investigator's choice of witnesses is biased. Neither the ambulance doctors nor the physicians who examined and attended to Alisa and Antonina in the hospital were officially interrogated.
- The scene of the accident is poorly observable from the position where the only eyewitness was standing. There is ample room for the eyewitness to misinterpret what he had seen.
- Representatives of the prosecution have changed their interpretation of what took place in their comments to the media. At first, they stated that Antonina had pushed Alisa down. Then they stated that she had held the child above the stairwell and dropped her. Kirill Martynov believes that in one of these versions, the prosecutor clearly must have lied.
- The boy who witnessed the fall has changed his version of the events over the course of the investigation. The evidence provided by the mass media indirectly supports this claim of the defense. Thus, speaking on a Russian talk show (the "Let them talk" show mentioned above, see Timeline, May 16), an older neighbor stated that the boy had said that Antonina pushed the little girl between the upper, horizontal bars of the railing, saying "Будешь еще? Будешь еще?" However, in an interview with Aleksey Koryakov in The New Novgorod Newspaper, the boy himself stated, "No, they didn't say anything at all. They just stood there silently"; he also stated that the bars in question were the lower vertical ones.
- The case against Antonina was begun a month after the accident. Antonina was incarcerated two months after the accident. She spent all this time with Alisa.
- The height from which Alisa fell is clearly insufficient for premeditated murder by dropping a child.
- There are much simpler ways to commit such a crime.
- It is nearly impossible to push a child through a 15-centimeter gap between the bars. It is practically impossible to do so without making the child scream, while the only eyewitness claims that Alisa was silent.
- Antonina passed an independent polygraph test by Olga Belyushina (see Timeline, March 20). The conclusion of the examination was that "She did not have the intention to inflict harm on her child and she did not inflict harm on her."
- The state investigator has made biased comments to the media. For example, he said: "Yes, she took her by the hands, took her daughter (I don't know, well, I wouldn't even call her a mother after this sort of stuff...), she took both of [Alisa's] hands, held her above the abyss and... threw her down". Because of such comments to the press, Antonina sought legal action in defence of her honor and dignity.
- The investigation has committed numerous violations of the criminal and procedural law during the investigation. These violations have been listed in the charges against the investigator (see Timeline, June 9).
- After the beginning of a public campaign to defend Antonina, the attorney of the defence, all the witnesses, and the accused have been ordered to sign a non-disclosure undertaking. The defence attorney believes that "when the investigation ordered this non-disclosure undertaking and made the case classified, its only goal was to conceal the absence of evidence".

== Appraisal of some statements by the parties ==
- On April 20, the Novgorod City Prosecutor Andrey Yefimov made the following statement while talking with a "Gazeta.ru" journalist: "Our experts have reached an irrefutable conclusion that the child was pushed through the railing by force, as it is impossible for a girl of that age to get through the bars there on her own". Kirill Martynov published a message (with some relevant photos) in his blog which aims to refute this statement by the Prosecutor.

== Public response ==
Major Russian TV channels, radio stations and newspapers have covered the case in question. It has figured prominently in online discussions, particularly in the Livejournal blog system. Many well-known Russian public figures, engaged in politics, culture, and other areas of life, became involved in the case. They include:

- Maksim Kononenko, a TV host and blogger
- Aleksey Chadaev, Valery Ganichev, and Anatoly Kucherena, members of the Public Chamber of the Russian Federation
- Oleg Zykov, the Head of the Public Chamber Committee for the Protection of Children's Rights
- Yevgeny Roizman, a Russian State Duma deputy
- Alexander Deyna, a Novgorod City Duma deputy
- Yegor Kholmogorov, a writer
- Konstantin Rybalov, a lawyer of the firm "Barshchevsky and Partners" (the attorney for the defence in the 2008 trial)

The discussions on this topic have raised numerous issues that go beyond the question of Antonina's innocence, such as if it is required to incarcerate people who are not a threat to society, the accuracy of the testimony of a minor, the effect of the internet on such cases, children rights in Russia as well as the behaviour and methods of investigators that handle such cases.

== Discovery of Antonina and Alisa and completion of the court process ==
On 11 April 2024, police apprehended Antonina Martynova in Stavropol after 15 years on the wanted list. She was living there with her daughter Alisa Fyodorova, who by that time had grown up and was known as Maria. According to the testimony she gave in court, during the time she and her mother were in hiding, Alisa did not know her real name or date of birth, never used any documents, and studied at home or took private classes. The court refused to conduct a genetic examination and to verify whether the younger woman was identical to four-year-old Alisa Fyodorova, who had disappeared in 2008, being satisfied with the fact that both women did not deny it. According to journalist Anastasia Mironova, the arrest became possible thanks to her help to the investigative authorities, but no further details were given. Antonina never disclosed publicly how and with what assistance she went into hiding and how she managed to keep low profile, neither did this emerge during her testimony in court.

Since the defendant was evading sentencing, the normal statute of limitations did not apply. On 7 May, the Novgorod Regional Court sentenced Antonina Martynova, who again pleaded not guilty, to nine years in a penal colony. The only claimed eyewitness Yegor Kudrov, who was a 11-year-boy in 2007, had died in 2023, succumbing as an adult to drug overdose.

Soon after the sentence was delivered, Antonina Martynova legally divorced her second husband Kirill Martynov and returned to the surname she had used before 2008, Fyodorova; later on, she criticized both his subsequent political career and his role in her 2007-2008 case.

On 21 August 2024, at the First Court of Appeal of General Jurisdiction in Moscow, the hearing began on the appeal filed by Antonina’s lawyers and by her daughter, Alisa Fyodorova, against the verdict of the Novgorod court. On 19 September 2024, the First Court of Appeal of General Jurisdiction, in a panel of three judges, reviewed the appeal. Prosecutor Anna Gorik of the Prosecutor General’s Office, who had taken over the case from her Novgorod colleagues, stated that although she generally considered the guilty verdict well-founded, the sentencing judge had imposed punishment “without taking into account its impact on the living conditions of her family and on the living conditions of the victim herself.” “Based on the principle of humanity,” and considering the fact that the defendant had made amends by raising her daughter, as well as the “categorical” position of the alleged victim, who insisted on having the sentence overturned, the prosecutor asked that Antonina’s punishment be mitigated, giving her eight years in a penal colony, suspended. After deliberation, the court agreed with the prosecutor’s position, replaced the actual prison term with a suspended sentence, and released the defendant, Antonina Fyodorova, from custody.

Fyodorova’s lawyers expressed happiness “that the mother would be reunited with her daughter,” but called the court’s decision a compromise, adding that they did not know whether Fyodorova would attempt to have the conviction fully overturned in cassation.

== Bibliography ==
- Extended list of articles published in April–May 2007 (in Russian).
