= Free university =

Organization offering free public classes

A free university is an organization offering uncredited, public classes without restrictions to who can teach or learn. They differ in structure. In 1980 in the United States, about half were associated with a traditional university, about a third were independent, and the remainder were associated with a community group. About half at that time operated without fees. Starting with University of California, Berkeley's Free Speech Movement in 1964, hundreds of free universities sprouted within university communities throughout the 1960s as organizations for underground activism and political education. They were also known as experimental colleges, open education exchanges, and communiversities. After 1960s student activism subsided, free universities moved their programming off-campus and continued to exist as a venue for lifelong learning. After a slight lull in the early 1970s, enrollment increased mid-decade as part of an adult education wave.

== Free University Moscow ==
After repressions at Higher School of Economics several professors Gasan Gusejnov, Elena Lukyanova, Kirill Martynov decided to organise a new university. They said "We, professors and teachers of different universities, are joining forces to work with students in a new way. In spring 2020 we have all lived through the greatest crisis in the sphere of education in decades."

== See also ==
- Free University of New York
- Antiuniversity of London
- Midpeninsula Free University

== Bibliography ==
- Draves, Bill (1980). The Free University: A Model for Lifelong Learning. New York: Association Press. ISBN 978-0-695-81443-4.
