= Midpeninsula Free University =

Free university in California, United States

- Active: 1966–1971
- Students: Between 1,000 and 1,275, quarterly, 1968-1969
- Location: San Francisco Midpeninsula (Palo Alto, Menlo Park, Mountain View)

The Midpeninsula Free University (MFU) was one of the largest and most successful of the many free universities that sprang up on and around college campuses in the mid-1960s in the wake of the Free Speech Movement at University of California, Berkeley and the nationwide anti-war Teach-ins which followed. Like other free universities, it featured an open curriculum—anyone who paid the nominal membership fee ($10) could offer a course in anything—marxism, pacifism, candle making, computers, encounter, dance, or literature.

Courses were publicized in illustrated catalogs, issued quarterly and widely distributed. It had no campus; classes were taught in homes and storefronts. Its magazine-style illustrated newsletter, The Free You, published articles, features, fiction, poetry, and reviews contributed by both members and nonmembers. The MFU sponsored, Be-Ins, street concerts, a restaurant, a store, and was actively involved in every aspect of the flourishing counterculture on the Midpeninsula, including the anti-war movement at Stanford University.

== Aims and goals ==
Its original Preamble focused on the criticism of education found in SDS's Port Huron Statement. Later, as its courses and interests expanded to include the full range of 1960s counterculture—especially the burgeoning human potential movement—the MFU adopted a revised Preamble reflecting a more expansive vision—a document which one commentator characterized as "a compelling and almost classical manifesto" of the aspirations of 1960s counterculture.

In so far as the MFU had a concrete political philosophy, it was the belief that the counterculture harbored the potential for a new politics—open, more humane, and more creative—one that could lead to a true community and a better society. Eventually, the MFU came to focus on the encounter group and the psychodrama as the primary vehicle for that transformation.

== Enrollment, curriculum and governance ==
In its most active and successful years—1968-1969—enrollment varied between 1,000 and 1,275. Between 150 and 300 courses were offered each quarter, covering a variety of categories: Encounter/Sensitivity (26%), Arts (15%), Philosophy & Religion (13%), Crafts (12%), Politics & Economics (12%), Leisure (10%), Whole Earth Studies (8%), Education (4%). It was known for its intriguing and disparate mix of classes.

The MFU strove for full participatory democracy. All significant decisions were made by the membership, either at monthly membership meetings or weekly Coordinating Committee meetings open to any member who wished to participate and presided over by an elected Coordinator.

== Community and political involvement ==
The MFU brought together in classes and at meetings the diverse, overlapping and sometimes divergent, strains of the local counterculture—artists, crafts-people, writers, leftists, pacifists, dissatisfied liberals, disaffected street-people, environmentalists, people involved or interested in mysticism, computers, encounter, drugs, rock music and sexual freedom. It also supported, publicized, and collaborated with other countercultural organizations on the Midpeninsula and throughout the Bay Area.

The character of the MFU was defined as much by the concrete struggles and controversies it confronted as by its declared aims and goals. There was, first of all, its unsuccessful quest for a much-needed community center. That led to a peaceful demonstration and a series of street concerts featuring local rock bands. Not long after, the MFU was denied the right to hold one of its regular be-ins at a city park. It further antagonized the already hostile city fathers and the conservative Palo Alto Times by going to court, having Palo Alto's park ordinance declared unconstitutional, and holding its Be-In as scheduled. All of this occurred as opposition to Stanford's involvement in war-related research was crystallizing. MFU members participated in the protests and sit-ins which ultimately—after injunctions, mass arrests and trials—resulted in Stanford divesting itself of the Stanford Research Institute and eliminating ROTC. While all that was happening, the MFU—along with Kepler's Books, the local Kennedy Action Corps headquarters, the Resistance, and the home of a Palo Alto Councilmember who supported gun control—became the target of a series of firebombings, conducted by a right-wing group calling themselves the Society of Man.

== The Free You newsletter ==
Besides the usual announcements and in-house news, The Free You published stories, poems, essays, humor, reviews, travel pieces, re-prints, commentary, and even recipes. The text was accompanied by photographs, illustrations and artwork, often in color, in a magazine-like format, utilizing the recently developed IBM Selectric Composer. Like the catalogs, which used the same technology, it was widely distributed.

Its editorial policy was, like the MFU's classes, wide-open. Any member of the community could submit an article, story, poem or other piece of work and it would be published with minimum editing by the staff. It also published original work by well-known writers and poets—Ken Kesey, Wendell Berry, Robert Stone, Thom Gunn, Ed McClanahan, Gurney Norman.

== Decline and demise ==
By late 1969, the political and life-style tensions latent in the counterculture had emerged, and the leadership of the MFU—weary and frustrated in their attempts to realize its aims and aspirations—looked for a new generation of leaders and another path. That new leadership came from a group of members affiliated with the Revolutionary Union, a Marxist–Leninist-Maoist organization, which later became Venceremos. In 1970, it took control of the MFU, repudiated its preamble and re-organized its newsletter. Enrollment fell to 700 in 1970 and to 70 by 1971; in July the MFU was disbanded.

== People ==
Course leaders came primarily from the community. Some were well known and some were prominent visitors: Paul Goodman was the principal speaker at an early organizational meeting; Herbert Marcuse taught a seminar; Joan Baez lectured on non-violence; Norman O. Brown, Stewart Brand, Richard Alpert (later, Ram Dass), Alexander Lowen, Robert Hass, and David Harris all taught classes at one time or another.

While the MFU model was egalitarian, much of its success was due to a core group of leaders and a dedicated staff, all of whom taught classes and most of whom held elected positions, such as: Robb Crist, Vic Lovell, Robert Cullenbine, Kim Woodard, Larry Tesler, Marc Porat, Jim Warren, John McCarthy, Graham and Rene Lewis, Tom Reidy, Roy Kepler, Kathy Kirby, Tom Crystal, Gail Teel, Grace Olsen, Mark Jensen, Docey Baldwin, Dorothy Bender, and Jim Wolpman.

The Free You newsletter was first edited by Jim Warren and later by Fred Nelson, Ed McClanahan, Gurney Norman, and Jon Buckley. Bob Palmer was its master printer; Nina Wolf, Joan Larimore, Emil Pierre, Lee Reeves, and Phil Trounstine were responsible for most of its graphics and much of its photography.

== FBI surveillance ==
From 1968 through 1971, the FBI—as a part of its nationwide COINTELPRO operation directed at dissident political organizations—conducted extensive surveillance of the MFU and many of its leaders. The available FBI file runs about 200 pages, with numerous redactions. Informants were utilized. Individual names were noted, and a number of members were included or considered for inclusion in the FBI's "Security Index" of persons to be detained without a warrant should a crisis occur.

== See also ==
- Free University of New York
- Antiuniversity of London
