= Antiuniversity of London =

Alternative education project in London, England

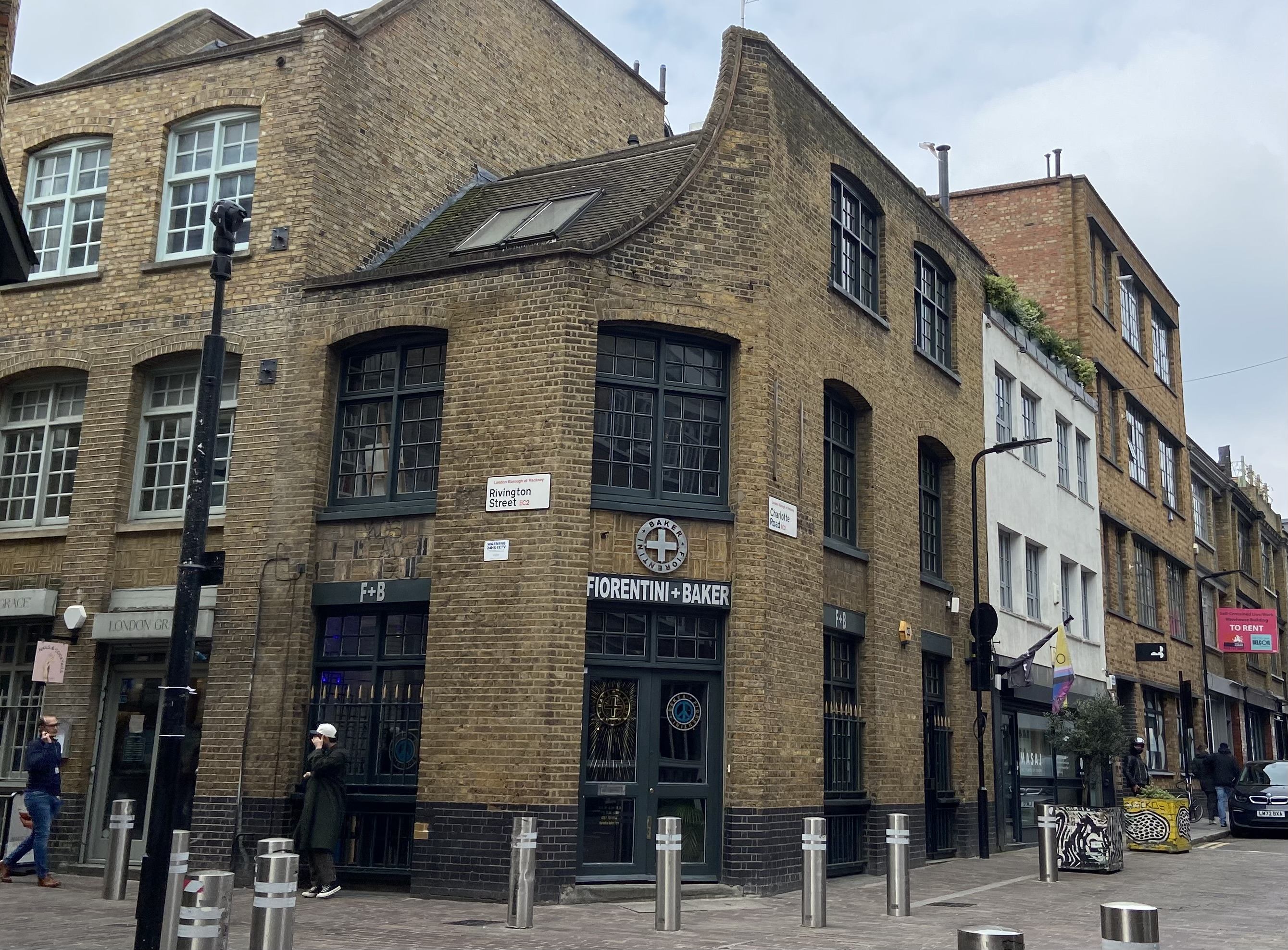
- Original location of the Antiuniversity until August 1968 (pictured in 2024)
- Type: Free university
- Active: 1968–1971
- Founders: David Cooper and Allen Krebs
- Location: 49 Rivington Street, Shoreditch, London EC2A 3QB (until August 1968)

The Antiuniversity of London was an anti-establishment, alternative education project founded in London in February 1968. Established as a "free university", it was initially based at 49 Rivington Street in Shoreditch; in a Bertrand Russell Peace Foundation building which had previously been used by the Vietnam Solidarity Campaign.

== Background ==
Inspired by the 1967 Dialectics of Liberation Congress, a group of radicals met in London from December 1967 through January 1968 to plan for the creation of an "anti-university". These radicals included anti-psychiatrists R. D. Laing and David Cooper; veterans of the Free University of New York, Allen Krebs and Joe Berke; the feminist psychoanalyst Juliet Mitchell; and the cultural theorist Stuart Hall.

The Antiuniversity of London was opened to students on 12 February 1968 by David Cooper and Allen Krebs.

== Teaching ==
Faculty members included beat poet Allen Ginsberg and Black Power activist Stokely Carmichael (Kwame Ture). Lecturers and speakers included Cornelius Cardew, C. L. R. James, Robin Blackburn, Bob Cobbing, Yoko Ono, Jeff Nuttall, John Latham and Alex Trocchi. Other notable participants include sociologist Calvin C. Hernton and Obi Egbuna, co-founder of the Universal Coloured People's Association and the British Black Panthers. The antiuniversity was described by Joe Berke as part of a "vanguard of large scale resistance which in the West takes the form of cultural guerrilla warfare".

The style of teaching at the Antiuniversity was highly unconventional. The core syllabus focused on radical politics, existential psychiatry and the artistic avant-garde. In one class, founding teacher Joe Berke asked: "How can we discuss how we can discuss what we want to discuss?" To which a student answered "Maybe we don’t need to discuss it." After pondering this for a moment Berke then left, and the class continued for an hour despite his absence.

The Antiuniversity effectively operated as a "free university"; an organisation offering unaccredited, public classes without restrictions on who can teach or learn. Despite this, the antiuniveristy charged an initial membership fee of £8, plus 10 shillings for each course attended. Nonetheless, Bob Cobbing resigned from the antiuniversity on 7 July 1968 in a letter to Joe Berke, citing among other things the untenable economic situation created by the antiuniversity's decrying of membership fees combined with a lack of alternative funding arrangements.

== Decline ==
Under the pressure of mounting bills and squatters, the Antiuniversity was forced out of its campus building on Rivington Street by August 1968 when it was taken back by its owner, the Bertrand Russell Peace Foundation. The antiuniversity continued holding lectures and classes at various locations including members' flats and various pubs, although the last known advertisements for the antiuniversity date to 1971.

49 Rivington Street is now occupied by an artisan shoemaker's shop, and much of the Shoreditch area has since been gentrified.

== Legacy ==
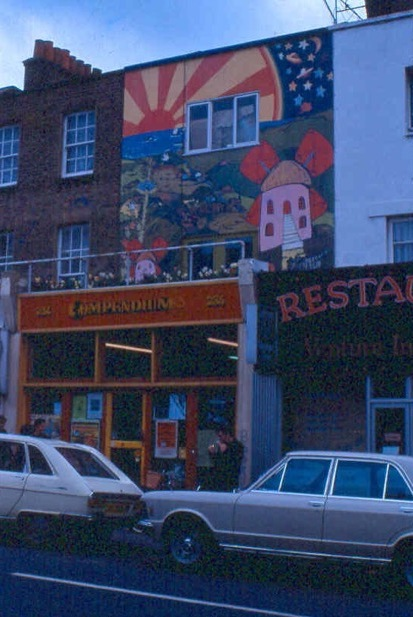
Compendium Books, established by Antiuniversity alumnus Diana Gravill, was located in Camden between 1968 and 2000

Among the lecturers at the Antiuniversity was psychoanalyst and feminist Juliet Mitchell, who persuaded one of her students - Diana Gravill - to use money that she had inherited to set up a bookshop with her partner on Camden High Street in 1968. Compendium Books went on to become a hub for radical literature for 30 years before closing in 2000.

=== Revival ===
The Antiuniversity was revived in 2015 as "Antiuniversity Now", in part as a protest against tuition fees. It functions in much the same way as the original antiuniversity, holding free and open events with a "non-hierarchical, participatory and democratic pedagogy".

== See also ==
- Free University of New York
- Midpeninsula Free University
- New Left
- Counterculture of the 1960s
