= Florika Remetier =

Romanian-American musician and feminist (1946-1979)

- Florika Remetier at the Halloween "hex" of Wall Street by W.I.T.C.H., 1968
- Born: February 28, 1946; Kingdom of Romania
- Died: August 30, 1979 (aged 33); United States
- Education: Hartt School of Music; Conservatoire de Paris; Accademia Nazionale di Santa Cecilia
- Occupation: Musician
- Organizations: New York Radical Women; W.I.T.C.H.
- Works: The Politics of Day Care (1969); Towards Strategy (1968)
- Movement: Socialist feminism

Florika Remetier (Note: In later life she went simply by "Florika" (sometimes spelled "Florica" by others).) (February 28, 1946 – August 30, 1979) was a Romanian-American musician and socialist feminist political activist. A child prodigy violinist, she would later join the New York Radical Women (NYRW) and co-founded the feminist guerrilla theater group W.I.T.C.H.

== Biography ==
=== Early life and music career ===
Florika was born on February 28, 1946, to a Jewish family in a displaced persons camp in Romania. Her father, Marcel Remetier, a musician and linguist, met Florika's mother, Theodora Feiga in Soviet Ukraine, where they had both been deported in 1940. After returning to Romania in 1946, they moved between several refugee camps in Germany and Italy. In 1951, they moved to a refugee camp in Italy, where Florika began playing the violin and piano at the age of 4, and later studied music at Rome's Santa Cecelia Academy after her musical talent was noticed by Maestro Giulio Bignani. By the age of 6, she had performed in five concerts in Germany and Italy and was highly praised by Italian music authorities.

Through the efforts of the United Service for New Americans and the American Jewish Joint Distribution Committee, the Remetier family left Bremerhaven, Germany on January 29, 1952, to be resettled in the United States. In March 1952 they arrived in New York City aboard the General W. G. Haan transport ship on the last journey organized by the International Refugee Organization before its dissolution. They eventually settled in Hartford, Connecticut after Florika was offered a full scholarship by the Hartt College of Music, where she studied the violin under Raphael Bronstein. She was given special permission by the Hartford Board of Education to attend elementary school in the morning only, so that she could take classes at Hartt College in the afternoon. In 1954 she performed with the Hartt Symphony Orchestra at the age of 8.

She returned to Europe in 1958 to study the violin at the Paris Conservatoire with Nadia Boulanger, and made her London debut with the BBC Orchestra in 1959, playing several of her own compositions. In 1960 she also began to study with Ricardo Odnoposoff in Vienna while continuing to study with Boulanger. She played widely in concerts in England and the United States, and toured with the Baltimore Symphony and Boston Symphony Orchestras.

Florika appeared on several radio and television shows during her early years, usually as a violinist, for instance playing a duet with Sam Levenson on Two for the Money. She also appeared on television in the United Kingdom, including on Val Parnell's Startime in 1959. On February 27, 1960, 14-year-old Florika appeared as a violinist on ATV's Saturday Night Spectacular with Jack Parnell, Petula Clark, and Guy Mitchell.

In her early 20s, she was a bass player in the New Haven Women's Liberation Rock Band, alongside fellow bassist Pat Ouellette, guitarist Harriet Cohen, and drummer Judy Miller, acting as a tutor to the other less experienced band members.

=== Political activism ===
As a member of the New York Radical Women (NYRW), Florika participated in the 1968 Miss America protest alongside Florynce Kennedy. Florika and Bonnie Allen were symbolically chained to a large "Miss America" puppet in a red, white and blue bathing suit designed by Mike Dobbins, the chains representing those "that tie us to these beauty standards against our will". The NYRW also participated in protests against the Vietnam War, in which Florika and her male partner created and distributed anti-war leaflets that featured parody advertisements, including superimposing an injured Vietnamese girl onto an advertisement for female beauty products.

In October 1968 – inspired by the outrageous acts of the Yippies – Florika and other members of the NYRW co-founded the feminist guerrilla theater group known as the "Women's International Terrorist Conspiracy from Hell", abbreviated as "W.I.T.C.H.", in New York City. The founders included Robin Morgan, Peggy Dobbins, Judy Duffett, Cynthia Funk, and Naomi Jaffe. W.I.T.C.H. made its most notable appearance on Halloween 1968 when Florika, Peggy Dobbins, Susan Silverman, Judith Duffett, Ros Baxandall and Cynthia Funk marched down Wall Street dressed as witches to place a "hex" on New York City's financial district. They were also joined by W.I.T.C.H. member Bev Grant who photographed the protest.

Florika and the other members of W.I.T.C.H. split from the NYRM by arguing that feminism must be anti-capitalist to avoid being co-opted. Florika did not believe feminism to be "intrinsically revolutionary" because "the existing system with its technological sophistication might be able to absorb and accommodate" the demands of women. Without an anti-capitalist analysis, the feminist movement would be unable to resist co-option, and would merely advance the interests of white, middle-class women. Writing in a 1968 article entitled "Towards Strategy" for the feminist magazine Voice of the Women's Liberation Movement, Florika outlined the issues she believed to be of importance in organizing a socialist feminist movement. In this article, she argued that male chauvinism and white racism are counterparts to one another, and that while men are exploited by the capitalist system, women are also additionally exploited by men. She also argued that "Woman is directly oppressed and subjugated by the corporation wherever she functions as a consumer", and that women are "not only projected by the mass media as an object and a commodity for consumption" but have also "emulated and reinforced that image by becoming a self-conscious, self-acting commodity". Florika therefore advocated that the capitalist system "should be attacked directly"

In 1969, Florika and Gilda wrote "The Politics of Day Care", published in Women: A Journal of Liberation in 1970. It provides an economic critique of day care as a function of the tension between the needs of the family and the demand for women's labor in a capitalist economy, and argues that for-profit day care is an attempt to regulate children's behavior in preparation for their future employer's discipline.

=== Later life and death ===
Florika suffered a significant mental breakdown during adolescence which ended her prosperous musical career. In the early 1970s she moved to San Francisco, California. After many years combatting depression and suicidal thoughts, Florika died from a drug overdose on August 30, 1979, at the age of 33. She is buried alongside her mother (d. 1976) and father (d. 1988) at Mount Hebron Cemetery in Flushing, Queens in New York City. Fellow W.I.T.C.H. co-founder Robin Morgan later dedicated a poem to Florika's life.

== Notable works ==
- The Politics of Day Care (1969)
- Towards Strategy (1968)
