= Allen Krebs =

American Marxist educationalist and sociologist (1934-1991)

- Allen Krebs in 1968
- Born: February 3, 1934; Brooklyn, New York, U.S.
- Died: December 10, 1991 (aged 57); Contra Costa County, California, U.S.
- Education: University of Michigan (PhD)
- Occupation: Assistant professor of sociology
- Employer: Adelphi University
- Known for: Co-founding the Free University of New York and the Antiuniversity of London
- Political party: Progressive Labor Party
- Movement: New Left
- Spouse: Sharon Krebs (divorced)

Allen Martin Krebs (February 3, 1934 – December 10, 1991) was an American sociology professor and Marxist educationalist known for co-founding the Free University of New York and the Antiuniversity of London.

== Biography ==
Allen Krebs earned his doctorate in social psychology from the University of Michigan and worked as an assistant professor of sociology at Adelphi University.

In the summer of 1964, Allen Krebs travelled to Cuba with his wife Sharon and their five-year-old son Thorsten in defiance of a government travel ban, leading to their passports being withdrawn upon their return to New York. He was subsequently dismissed from his job at Adelphi University in December 1964, although the official reason for his termination was given as "teaching deficiencies". In November 1965 he was reinstated by the university with a raise in pay, but he refused to rejoin the faculty.

In response to his initial dismissal, Krebs co-founded the Free University of New York (FUNY) in July 1965 with his wife Sharon Krebs, and politics lecturer Jim Mellen. Mellen had also been dismissed from his teaching position at Drew University, nominally for insufficient progress on his PhD, but he stated that the real reason for his termination was his open support for the Viet Cong. Allen and Sharon Krebs eventually divorced, and Sharon later served 3 years in prison for her part in an attempted arson attack on a bank in New York City.

In the summer of 1967, Krebs moved to London to take part in the Dialectics of Liberation Congress. In February the next year he co-founded the Antiuniversity of London alongside other participants of the congress, including fellow FUNY veteran Joe Berke.

Krebs was briefly associated with the American University in Beirut, where he wrote the article Hashish, Avant Garde and Rearguard which was published in the magazine Streets in 1965, providing a Marxist analysis of the Beat Generation, some of whom were drawn to Beirut for its low cost of living and easy availability of hashish.

Krebs was involved in the May 2nd Movement, a youth affiliate of the Progressive Labor Party (of which he was a member) organized in opposition to the Vietnam War. After his involvement in the FUNY and the Antiuniversity, Krebs disappeared from public life.

Allen Krebs died from lung cancer on December 10, 1991 in Contra Costa County, California aged 57.
