= Rat (newspaper) =

Underground newspaper

Cover of a circa 1968 issue

Rat Subterranean News, New York's second major underground newspaper, was created in March 1968, primarily by editor Jeff Shero, Alice Embree and Gary Thiher, who moved up from Austin, Texas, where they had been involved in The Rag.

== Beginnings ==
Rat immediately attained national notoriety for its exclusive inside stories from the Columbia University student uprising in the spring of 1968. Its notoriety grew further when two staff members (one of which was star reporter Jane Alpert) were arrested in connection with a series of non-lethal bombings of corporate offices and military targets in late 1969. Its reputation took a new turn when it was revamped as a feminist magazine in 1970. The first women-only issue was published in January 1970 with the headline "Women Seize Rat! Sabotage Tales!". In its new incarnation as Women's LibeRATion, it lasted into the fall of 1970.

While the East Village Other, published a few blocks away, represented the countercultural "establishment" with its relatively relaxed culture-oriented content, Rat embodied the raging far-left politics of the late Sixties. Unlike the orthodox Marxist press, however, it still represented the spirit of hippiedom. Its stripped-down, straightforward design (created by Bob Eisner, later a leading designer of mainstream papers) marked a sharp break with the baroque psychedelia of EVO and other first-generation underground papers. Its relatively austere aesthetics were relieved by cartoons, including covers by Robert Crumb and clippings from 1940s poultry magazines found on the street and used as decorations.

== Notable contributions ==
Among the memorable contents were original contributions from William S. Burroughs, an interview with Kurt Vonnegut, and front-line reports on the Weather Underground's seizure of SDS written by Shero and others. There were regular in-depth stories on the Young Lords, a militant Puerto Rican youth movement, and the Black Panthers — with a focus on New York's own Panther 21 terrorism trial, and well as news of the ongoing sagas of Huey Newton, Afeni Shakur, and Eldridge and Kathleen Cleaver. Jane Alpert wrote on her own experiences in the notorious New York Women's House of Detention after she was arrested for involvement in the bombings. Like most underground papers, Rat shared articles through the Underground Press Syndicate, allowing regular coverage of distant events like the Native American takeover of Alcatraz Island — and of course, looming over everything, the Vietnam War. Rat also shared articles with Come Out!, a gay liberation newspaper in NYC, published by the Gay Liberation Front.

While most pages of Rat serve as two-dimensional museums of its own era, its ecological writings are far-sighted even now. The 1969 Apollo 11 Moon landing was seen through a mirror, in a grand color centerfold, sponsored by the Sierra Club, headlined "Towards A More Moon-Like Earth" — probably written and designed by Jerry Mander and/or David Brower and/or Paul Simon aka Paul Zmeiwski. Coming hard on the heels of UPS reports from the bloody struggles over People's Park, this manifesto provided a radical planetary overview for the nascent ecology movement. As this came to Rat in the form of a paid advertisement from a national organization, it presumably appeared in several other papers at the same time. Further thoughts on this subject came from the famously ex-Marxist Murray Bookchin, a regular Rat contributor whose left-anarchist take on eco-politics anticipated (and influenced) the socially engaged anti-globalization movement that emerged in 1999. Some of his articles appeared under pseudonyms.

Rat's modest newsstand sales came mostly from "straight" people looking for offbeat entertainment and sex.

Rat was published during a period of layout innovation and had a dramatic look of jumbled letters and strong imagery. Stat camera reproduction of paste-ups composed of often "swiped" graphic elements, and letraset type, were fast and affordable. Contributing designers included Van Howell and Joe Schenkman. This largely forgotten period of innovation in communication is remembered for its association with period (mainly punk) music graphics and concert flyers, and for many campus publications and activist flyers. It is somewhat similar to the later desktop publishing revolution.

== Sex, drugs and rock 'n' roll ==
Before 1970, Rat was deeply involved in "sex, drugs and rock 'n' roll" as well as revolutionary art and politics. The July 1–15, 1968 featured a naked woman on the cover, with a man drawing an armed soldier on her chest. E.L. (photo editor Elliot Landy) commented inside, "Last time we ran a naked chick on the cover (4th issue) we temporarily doubled our circulation. Thought we'd do it again . . . obviously though that isn't a naked chick peering at you, gun belt around her neck, rifle in her arms, and garbage can by our side; that's our art director doing his thing on the model — which is really what this newspaper is all about anyway." This comment is made in reference to the cover of the April 5–18, 1968 issue, credited to Elliot Landy, featuring the head and torso of a naked woman with a drawing of an armed rat across her body.

In the next issue Jeff Shero offered his own thoughts: "Sex is the magic commodity in New York. Every time we print a nude on the cover circulation jumps five thousand" and in the following issue someone wrote: "Two weeks ago we put tits on the cover and commented that the previous cover we did with tits doubled our circulation. It happened again, not quite double but a considerable increase in sales—the paper sold out on many, many newsstands."

Profits from Pleasure, a pornographic tabloid, published separately by one of Rat's founders, may have paid some of Rat's printing bills. Covert sources of income are rumored to have included personal donations from the poet W. H. Auden. Printing bills sometimes went unpaid, During lean periods, Rat would find new printers willing to take on the legal and financial risks of publishing New York's most notorious paper. During most of 1969, Rat came out of the legendary Septum Printing plant of Oceanside, NY. Rat's financial news from "The Street" charted market fluctuations in the street prices of various drugs.

Rat was perhaps responsible for the most peculiar footnote in the history of rock music. Some recent internet writers have claimed that Rat was the source of the 1969 "Paul is Dead" rumor, which had millions examining Beatles albums for cryptic clues that Paul McCartney was actually dead and a replacement Paul had taken his place.

There was an exclusive interview with Jimi Hendrix, and another with John and Yoko during their Toronto "bed-in" to promote peace. It seems probable that Frank Zappa was inspired by a sign painted on the front window of Rat's 14th Street office, originally the previous tenant's advertisement reading "photostats made while you wait," now neatly altered to proclaim "Hot Rats made while you wait," in early March 1969; Zappa's first solo album appeared in October with that title in similar typography.

== Takeover of Rat: Women's LibeRATion ==
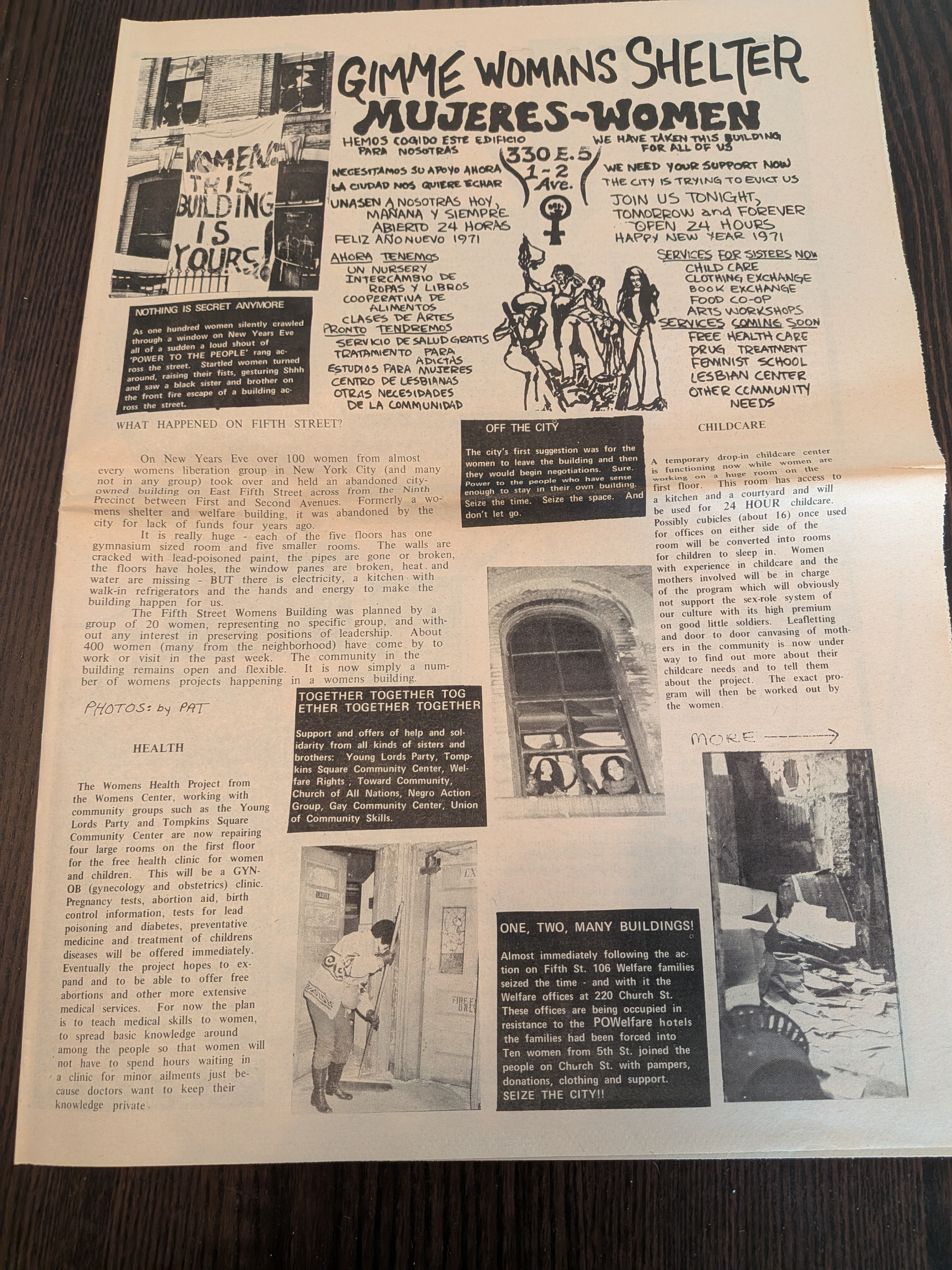
Article on the Fifth Street Women's Building Takeover in Rat #18

A takeover by W.I.T.C.H. — Women's International Terrorist Conspiracy from Hell — and its sister groups turned RAT into Women's LibeRATion. Robin Morgan led that women's takeover of Rat in 1970, making a decisive break from what she described as the "male Left", and listed the reasons for her break in the first women's issue of the paper, in her essay titled "Goodbye to All That". The essay gained notoriety in the press for naming specific sexist men and institutions in the Left. With a new staff of politically charged women, this newspaper was one of the first second wave feminist newspapers in the United States. The collective of women involved with the takeover is listed as including Robin Morgan, Jill Boskey, Jane Alpert, Larelei B., Ruth Beller, Pam Booth, Valerie Bouvier, Naomi Glauberman, Carol Grosberg, Sharon Krebs, Jayce Pelcha, Daria Price, Judy Robinson, Miriam Rosen, Barbara Rothkrug, Judy Russell, Lisa Schneider, Martha Shelley, Brenda Smiley, Christine Sweet, Judy Walenta, Cathy Werner, and Sue Simensky (who is also credited with cover art for the newspaper.) A few male staff also stayed after the takeover to help briefly with production until they were asked to leave.

It is noteworthy that the percentage of the paper devoted to reporting would-be revolutionaries' warfare with the state actually increased following the women's takeover, as did a tendency toward hard-left politics and Maoist graphics. The fiery Women's LibeRATion was a far cry from the upwardly-mobile feminism associated with the National Organization for Women and Ms. magazine a few years later. Issues of workplace discrimination and sexual harassment were already a major concern, however. A poem about office work by Marge Piercy, Metamorphosis into Bureaucrat, appeared in the women's Rat of March 7, 1970, containing the lines "Swollen, heavy, rectangular/ I am about to be delivered / of a baby /zerox machine." Other articles featured reprints of material about the Young Lords Party, as well as coverage of the Young Lords takeover of Lincoln Hospital.

After the women's takeover, Rat covered the 1971 Fifth Street Women's Building Takeover and other feminists protests around the world.

== A new publication chronicling the History of the RAT ==
According to the Rat Subterranean News website, a book with accompanying eBook including original articles and graphics from RAT is in production in 2016. This book will allow the reader to relive that turbulent period and will have special sections on Woodstock, the takeover of Columbia University and the Trial of the Chicago Eight that resulted from the demonstrations during the Democratic Convention there in 1968.

== See also ==
- List of underground newspapers of the 1960s counterculture
