= Women's International Terrorist Conspiracy from Hell =

American Feminist group from the 1960s

W.I.T.C.H., originally the acronym for Women's International Terrorist Conspiracy from Hell, was the name of several related but independent feminist groups active in the United States as part of the women's liberation movement during the late 1960s. The W.I.T.C.H. moniker was sometimes alternatively expanded as "Women Inspired to Tell their Collective History", or "Women Interested in Toppling Consumer Holidays", among other variations.

The first W.I.T.C.H. group was established in New York City in October 1968. Its founders were socialist feminists who had formerly been members of the New York Radical Women group. They opposed the idea advocated by radical feminists that feminist women should campaign against "patriarchy" alone. Instead W.I.T.C.H. advocated for feminists to ally with a range of left-wing causes, to bring about wider social change in the United States.

Various scholars have suggested that in embracing the iconography of the witch, and with the witch trials in the early modern period, W.I.T.C.H. represented forerunners of various forms of feminist-oriented modern Paganism such as Dianic Wicca.

== Founding ==
The most significant aspect of W.I.T.C.H. was its choice of central symbol: the witch. By choosing this symbol, feminists were identifying themselves with everything women were taught not to be: ugly, aggressive, independent, and malicious. Feminists took this symbol and molded it - not into the fairy tale "good witch," but into a symbol of female power, knowledge, independence, and martyrdom.

— Religious studies scholar Cynthia Eller, 1993

Within the women's liberation movement of the United States during the 1960s, there was a division between the "politicos" and the "radical feminists". The politicos were socialist feminists and attributed the oppression of women to capitalism, seeking to ally with other leftist causes – such as the New Left, black liberation movement, student movement, and anti-war movement – in a wider socio-political movement to bring about revolutionary change. Conversely, the radical feminists did not view women's oppression as a symptom of capitalism and wanted women's liberation to remain independent of the wider leftist movement.

W.I.T.C.H. was formed when the New York Radical Women (NYRW) split in 1969. The group's main founder was Youth International Party co-founder Nancy Kurshan. Several politicos within the NYRW, most notable Robin Morgan and Florika Remetier, were inspired by the actions of the Youth International Party, or "Yippies", which had been founded in December 1967 and which sought to promote its message by shocking and offending mainstream American sensibilities. Morgan, Roz Payne and Sharon Krebs co-founded the group with Kurshan. Other NYRW members, such as Kathie Sarachild and Carol Hanisch disagreed, believing in the need to continue consciousness raising and disliking the idea of adopting deliberate shock tactics.

A number of these NYRW politicos then established W.I.T.C.H.; among those involved were Morgan, Florika, Peggy Dobbins, Judy Duffett, Cynthia Funk, and Naomi Jaffe. Unverified claims have been made that the establishment of W.I.T.C.H. was inspired by the decision of the House Un-American Activities Committee (HUAC) to hold hearings investigating alleged communist involvement in demonstrations against the 1968 Democratic National Convention. The women who established W.I.T.C.H. were angry that while a number of male radicals were subpoenaed by HUAC, the female activists had not been.

The group was established in New York on Halloween 1968, at which point they adopted the name "Women's International Terrorist Conspiracy from Hell" and its acronym, W.I.T.C.H. The group changed their name to suit their purposes, albeit retaining the fixed letters of W.I.T.C.H. For instance, during a demonstration against the Bell Telephone company, the group used "Women Incensed at Telephone Company Harassment". Other examples included "Women Infuriated at Taking Care of Hoodlums" and "Women Indentured to Traveler's Corporate Hell".

== Activism ==
W.I.T.C.H. is an all-woman Everything. It's theater, revolution, magic, terror, joy, garlic flowers, spells. It's an awareness that witches and gypsies were the original guerrillas and resistance fighters against oppression – particularly the oppression of women – down through the ages. Witches have always been women who dared to be: groovy, courageous, aggressive, intelligent, nonconformist, explorative, curious, independent, sexually liberated, revolutionary. (This possibly explains why nine million of them have been burned.)

— W.I.T.C.H. Manifesto

W.I.T.C.H. were devoted to overthrowing the patriarchal dominance of society, and according to the scholar Cynthia Eller, they chose to do so in "witty, flamboyant, and theatrical ways" by carrying out witch-themed political stunts. The group's inaugural action took place on Halloween 1968, as W.I.T.C.H. members dressed as witches and marched down Wall Street in order to place a "hex" on New York's financial district. This event was documented by Bev Grant's photographs. Morgan stated that the Dow Jones Industrial Average declined sharply the next day. She also noted that this action emphasized the working-class struggle against capitalism more than the feminist struggle.

Subsequent acts of protest conducted by W.I.T.C.H. placed a greater focus on women's issues. The Chicago group staged protests in Chicago after hearing about New York City Actions, including actions at Chicago Board of Trade, the American Medical Association's annual conference, and the University of Chicago. In one instance, the group's New York City members entered the legendary restaurant of the era Max's Kansas City, where they distributed garlic cloves and cards on which were written the motto: "We Are W.I.T.C.H. We Are Women. We Are Liberation. We Are We." At the same time they chanted "Nine Million Women! Burned as Witches!" and questioned the women diners on why they were willing to have a man buy them dinner.

In January 1969, a counter-inaugural protest was organized by various feminist groups, taking place in Washington, D.C., to demonstrate against the inauguration of Richard Nixon as President of the United States. W.I.T.C.H. members arrived from New York, appropriating some of the New York Radical Feminists' banners – which were emblazoned with the declaration of "Feminism Lives" – and replacing it with "W.I.T.C.H." in crayon. Rumors circulated at the protest that W.I.T.C.H. members had planned to pull the radical feminist speaker Shulamith Firestone down from the podium when she had been planned to speak; they disagreed with her vocal criticism of those men who were involved in the leftist movement. After the protest, W.I.T.C.H. members subsequently sent a letter to the Guardian repudiating Firestone's calls for women's liberation groups to divorce themselves from the wider left-leaning social movement in U.S. society. In this letter, it described women's liberation as "part of a general struggle; we are as essential to the movement as it is to us". It further reprimanded Firestone for her vocal attacks of men who were part of the movement, stating that "directing ourselves against men ... only reinforces the oppressive pattern of women defining themselves through men".

“Double, bubble, war and rubble,
When you mess with women, you’ll be in trouble.
We’re convicted of murder if abortion is planned.
Convicted of conspiracy if we fight for our rights.
And burned at the stake when we stand up to fight.”
– W.I.T.C.H. Hex, 1969

In February 1969, W.I.T.C.H. members held a protest at a bridal fair at Madison Square Garden. Wearing black veils, they chanted "here comes the slaves/off to their graves", and posted stickers around the area emblazoned with the statement, "confront the whoremakers", a pun on the common anti-war slogan, "confront the warmongers". The protests also involved turning loose several white mice at the event, which fair attendees began scooping up off the ground. Radical feminists criticized W.I.T.C.H. members for reinforcing the sexist stereotype that the assembled women would be scared of mice. They also condemned what they understood as W.I.T.C.H.'s approach of promoting a message of "we're liberated and you're not" to other women, believing that in doing so they were distancing and alienating themselves from feminism's base constituency. Later historian Alice Echols expressed criticism over what she saw as W.I.T.C.H.'s "contempt" for those women who were not involved in broader leftist activism. The bridal fair event resulted in negative media coverage for W.I.T.C.H., and some dissension among members over goals and tactics. After the incident, W.I.T.C.H. moved away from the shock tactics that they had previously employed and instead focused their attention on consciousness-raising.

On August 10, 1969, a W.I.T.C.H. group, calling itself Women Incensed at Telephone Company Harassment, gathered at St. Paul's Churchyard in New York to protest working conditions at AT&T.

Spin-off "covens" were founded in Chicago, Illinois, and Washington, D.C., and W.I.T.C.H. zaps continued until roughly the beginning of 1970. In 1969, a Chicago "coven" gathered in an action outside the Chicago Transit Authority headquarters to "hex" the CTA over a proposed transit hike, dancing and chanting. In another instance, W.I.T.C.H. members protested the firing of a radical feminist professor by entering the sociology department of the University of Chicago and leaving hair and nail clippings all over the building.

In February 1970, the Washington coven held a protest during a Senate hearing on population control. They interrupted Texas Senator Ralph Yarborough's testimony by chanting and throwing pills at panel members and people in the audience galleries.

A takeover by W.I.T.C.H. and its sister groups turned RAT into Women's LibeRATion. Robin Morgan led that women's takeover of Rat in 1970, making a decisive break from what she described as the "male Left", and listed the reasons for her break in the first women's issue of the paper, in her essay titled "Goodbye to All That". The essay gained notoriety in the press for naming specific sexist men and institutions in the Left.

== Understanding of witchcraft ==
In their leaflets, W.I.T.C.H. adopted the witch-cult hypothesis by claiming that those persecuted as alleged witches in European history had been members of a surviving pre-Christian, pagan religion which the Christian authorities then sought to suppress. In their manifesto, W.I.T.C.H. propagated the erroneous claim that nine million women had been burned to death during the witch trials in the early modern period. This claim had originated with the first-wave feminist Matilda Joslyn Gage.

W.I.T.C.H. declared that any woman could become a W.I.T.C.H. by declaring herself to be one, and that moreover any group of women could form a witches' coven. In one of their leaflets, it is stated that:

If you are a woman and dare to look within yourself, you are a W.I.T.C.H.. You make your own rules. You are free and beautiful. You can be invisible or evident in how you choose to make your W.I.T.C.H.-self known. You can form your own Coven of sister Witches (thirteen is a cozy number for a group) and do your own actions ... You are a W.I.T.C.H. by saying aloud, "I am a W.I.T.C.H." three times, and thinking about that. You are a W.I.T.C.H. by being female, untamed, angry, joyous, and immortal.

== Notable members ==
Members of W.I.T.C.H. included cofounder Robin Morgan, a child television star in the 1950s and a member of the Yippies in the late 1960s, who became an important feminist. Yippie co-founder Nancy Kurshan was also an early member, mentioned in the W.I.T.C.H. documents included in the 1970 anthology Sisterhood Is Powerful: An Anthology of Writings From The Women's Liberation Movement, edited by Morgan.

The Oxford English Dictionary credits Morgan with using the term "herstory" in print in this anthology. Concerning W.I.T.C.H., Morgan wrote:

The fluidity and wit of the witches is evident in the ever-changing acronym: the basic, original title was Women's International Terrorist Conspiracy from Hell [...] and the latest heard at this writing is Women Inspired to Commit Herstory.

However, soon after the breakup of W.I.T.C.H., Morgan repudiated her New Left-aligned politics, and embraced a kind of radical feminism that was strongly opposed to "the male left". She later dismissed W.I.T.C.H. as a form of "clownish proto-anarchism" which had not "raised our own consciousness very far out of our own combat boots".

Other notable members included Peggy Dobbins and Naomi Jaffe, who went on to join the Weather Underground Organization.

== Legacy ==
Writing in 1979, the journalist Margot Adler expressed the view that while W.I.T.C.H. was considered to be "a fringe phenomenon" in the women's movement at the time of its founding, by the end of the seventies, its sentiments were embraced by a larger proportion of feminists, if still a minority within the feminist community.

W.I.T.C.H. were a political rather than a religious or spiritual group, however several scholars of Pagan studies have considered them to be partial precursors to the Dianic Wiccans, members of a feminist-oriented form of Modern Paganism which developed in the United States during the 1970s. According to Adler, W.I.T.C.H.'s key assumptions about the nature of witchcraft and its connection to women's liberation continued as the "wellspring" of Dianic Wicca and other forms of feminist-oriented Paganism.

Red W.I.T.C.H., a socialist spin-off of W.I.T.C.H, was created by teaching staff at UC Berkeley after they witnessed the W.I.T.C.H. actions in Chicago. Led by Laura X, Red W.I.T.C.H. responded to the patriarchal elements of socialist organization in the early 1960s, criticizing the contradictions between ideals of radical males and their behavior.

=== Revival ===
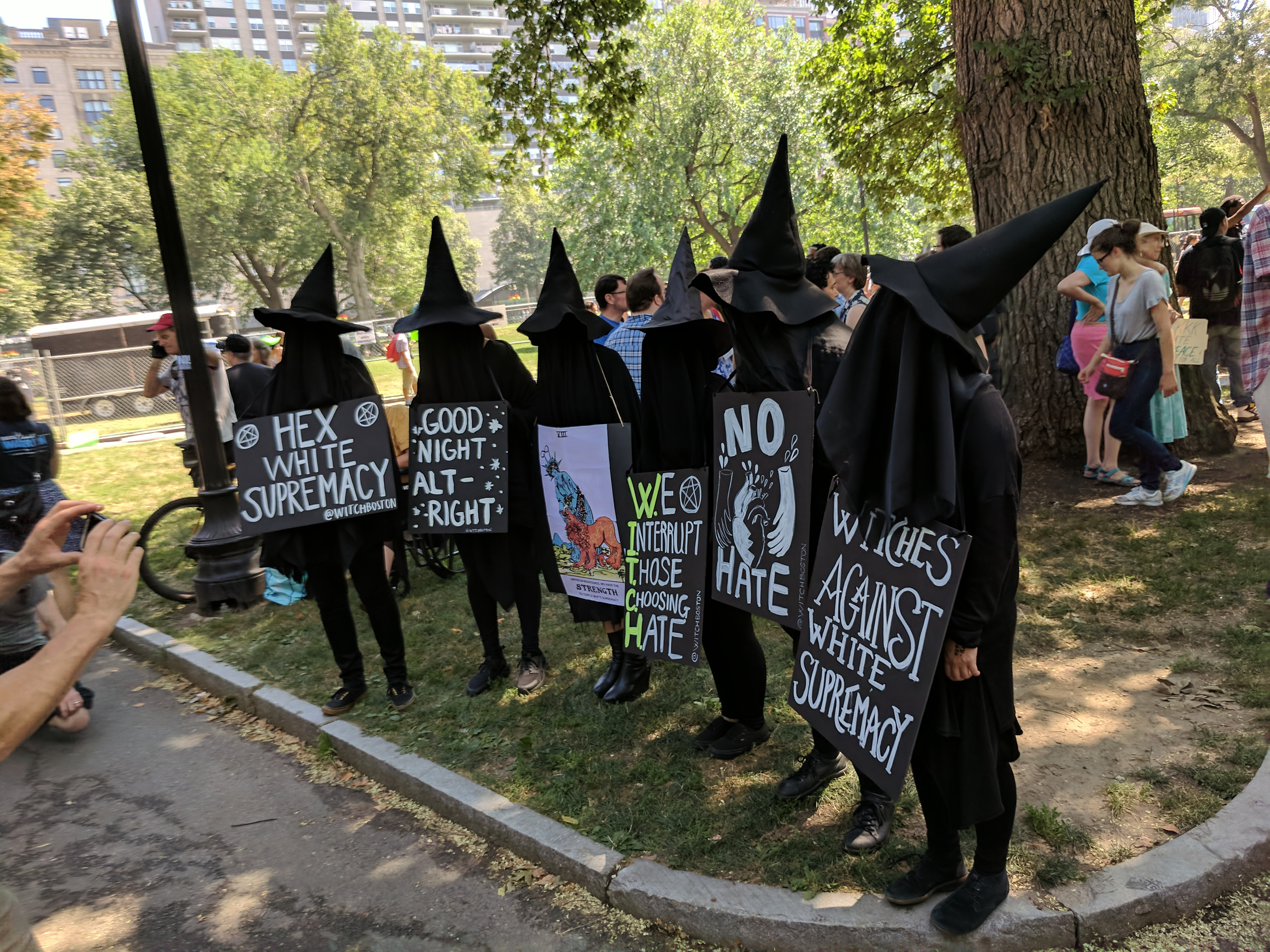
Members of W.I.T.C.H. Boston holding signs counterprotesting the Boston Free Speech Rally on August 19, 2017

In 2015, the Chicago chapter was reestablished by three women. Their first action took place in November 2015. Later actions targeted the lack of affordable housing, abortion rights and the Trump administration's condoning of racism and sexism. Members staged a ritual in the Logan Square neighborhood in 2015 to protest housing inequalities throughout the city. Participating members at this event included Jessica Caponigro, Chiara Galimberti, and Amaranta Isyemille Ramos. In 2017, the group's members from the W.I.T.C.H. Chicago Coven group of 2015-2017 intentionally pulled themselves out of the public eye to make space for the creation of an anonymous W.I.T.C.H. chapter in Chicago. They still promote the continuation of the practice of performing rituals to fight against inequality in all of its form.

In response to the 2016 United States presidential election, protest groups formed in Portland and Boston that named themselves after W.I.T.C.H. and took inspiration from their tactics.
