= The Family Giving Tree =

American non-profit organization

The Family Giving Tree is a charitable organization that strives to alleviate the consequences of poverty in the California Bay Area. The organization is based on the principle of helping those in need and inspiring philanthropy in the community. The Family Giving Tree runs two seasonal programs each year, a backpack drive during the summer, and a holiday wish program during December.

== Overview ==
The Family Giving Tree was founded in 1990 as a San Jose State University MBA class project. Jennifer Cullenbine and Todd Yoshida were asked to "create a program that adds value to someone else's life." They created the Family Giving Tree with the hope of providing holiday gifts to 300 children in East Palo Alto. Encouraged by the success of the first year, Jennifer decided to continue and expand the organization.

As of 2010, the Family Giving Tree has fulfilled the specific wish of 718,488 individuals in need, and provided 91,028 backpacks filled with much needed supplies to low-income students. The organization partners with local social service agencies, schools, and corporations to fulfill the "wishes" of underprivileged children that would otherwise go without. These children are prequalified by the social service agencies to determine their specific need. The social service agencies and teachers from local schools pick up the gifts and backpacks to distribute throughout the San Francisco Bay Area. During each program the Family Giving Tree must find approximately 100,000 square feet (9,300 m^{2}) of donated warehouse space in which the thousands of volunteers can process the donated gifts and backpacks.

Family Giving Tree is one of very few non-profits in the San Francisco Bay Area to receive Charity Navigator's 4-star rating.

== The Holiday Wish Drive ==
This program works by selecting families, and/or individuals who have registered with recipient social service agencies and schools. These individuals are interviewed to ascertain their current needs. Their requests are printed on cards and distributed to host companies throughout the San Francisco Bay Area. Hosts place these wish cards on trees in break areas or cafeterias for their employees. Other hosts place their cards in more public locations such as building lobbies or sales floors for customers. Employees and/or customers pick one or more wish cards, purchase the gift, then return it with the wish card attached. Volunteers then collect, sort and distribute the gifts to the recipient agencies.

== Back-to-School Drive ==
The Back-to-School Drive identifies children in need through the Federal Free and Reduced Lunch Program (Title I). Much like the Holiday Wish Drive, employees and/or customers of registered host companies, select a wish card, purchase a backpack, and fill it with much needed school supplies such as pencils and paper. Backpacks are distributed to schools, who then in turn distribute the supplies to children enrolled in the Federal Free and Reduced Lunch Program (Title I).
