= Sam Melville =

American activist and convict (1934–1971)

Samuel Melville
- Born: Samuel Joseph Grossman; 1934; New York City, US
- Died: September 13, 1971 (aged 36–37); Attica, New York, US
- Cause of death: Gunshot wounds
- Occupation: draftsman
- Spouse: Ruth Melville
- Children: 1
- Parent(s): Dorothy and William Grossman
- Criminal charges: conspiracy, explosives
- Penalty: 18 years in prison

Samuel Joseph Melville (né Grossman; 1934 – September 13, 1971), was an American left-wing activist and terrorist who was the principal conspirator and bomb setter in the 1969 bombings of eight government and commercial office buildings in New York City. Melville cited his opposition to the Vietnam War and US imperialism as the motivation for the bombings. He pleaded guilty to conspiracy and to bombing the Federal Office Building in lower Manhattan, as well as to assaulting a marshal in a failed escape attempt. A key figure in the 1971 Attica Prison riots, he was shot by the police and killed when the uprising was put down by force.

== Early life ==
Sam Melville (a name borrowed from author Herman Melville) was born to Dorothy and William Grossman in 1934 in New York City. Dorothy left William and moved with Sam back to her hometown of Tonawanda, New York, a suburb of Buffalo. Melville lost sight in one eye at a young age because of a flying cinder. He claimed to have had a rough childhood because of his mother's series of alcoholic and abusive boyfriends. He left home and moved to Buffalo as a teenager, making his living as a bowling alley pinsetter.

Melville later met his father, who had come to Western New York to look for him. His father convinced him to move back to New York City, finish his high school education and pursue his passion for singing. Back in New York, Melville completed high school, studied singing, found employment as a draftsman, married and started a family.

== Politics ==
Although Melville had enjoyed his job, he quit his position in outrage when his employer assigned him to a project designing office buildings in South Africa, then still operating under apartheid, on behalf of Chase Manhattan Bank. The abrupt resignation created a rift between Melville and his wife, and he ultimately became estranged from both her and their child.

Afterwards, Melville survived by working odd jobs, including for the National Guardian, a weekly left-wing newspaper published in New York City. He became involved with the opposition to the war in Vietnam, acquainting himself with left-wing political organizations, meeting radical activists, and steeping himself in radical politics. He became particularly interested in the story of George Metesky, a man who had engaged in a mass-bombing campaign across New York City between 1940 and 1956, having targeted a total of 37 terminals, theaters, libraries, and office buildings. Metesky was confined to a state mental hospital, but Melville began writing "George Metesky Was Here" on buildings around the city.

== Bombings ==
Melville was responsible for, or connected to, multiple bombings, all of them in 1969. The majority were preceded by telephone calls warning building security personnel plus simultaneous political communiques to the press. Although most explosions were timed for late-night hours, the bombing of the Marine Midland Building resulted in 19 injuries.

- Jul 27, Grace Pier, owned by United Fruit Company
- Aug 20, Marine Midland Building
- Sep 19, Federal Office Building on Federal Plaza, offices of the Department of Commerce and the Army Inspector General
- Oct 7, Army Induction Center on Whitehall Street
- Nov 11, Standard Oil offices in the RCA Building
- Nov 11, Chase Manhattan Bank headquarters offices
- Nov 11, General Motors Building
- Nov 12, Manhattan Criminal Courthouse at 100 Centre St., where the Panther 21 trial was being held.

== Accomplices ==
Melville had met and become romantically involved with Jane Alpert, a recent graduate of Swarthmore College, while she was enrolled in a graduate program in journalism at Columbia University. The pair were also close with Pat Swinton and Dave Hughey who assisted them with several bombings. Other members of their group were never identified. Melville and Alpert became increasingly involved with the Weather Underground and the Black Panther Party.

== Arrest and charges ==
In New York City, Melville had been working with a radical activist group known as "The Crazies". One of their members, George Demmerle, was an FBI informant who assisted in the gathering of evidence and apprehension of the group. On November 12, 1969, hours after the Criminal Courts Building bombing, police arrested Melville and Demmerle as they placed dynamite charges in National Guard trucks parked outside the 69th Regimental Armory at 26th Street and Lexington Avenue. Alpert and Hughey were arrested shortly thereafter.

== Escape attempt ==
On March 7, 1970, Melville overpowered an unarmed marshal at the Federal Courthouse and tried to escape. During a conference with his attorney on a Saturday, when the building was almost deserted, he jumped the marshal, knocked him down and tied him up with his own belt before running out of the room and down a stairway. Melville was recaptured by an armed marshal on a landing two floors below.

== Imprisonment and death at Attica ==
Melville pleaded guilty in early May 1970 to conspiracy and to one of the bombings, as well as to assault during his escape attempt. He was eventually transferred to Attica Prison, in Western New York. There, he began an underground publication, Iced Pig, and began to organize the prison population to fight for better conditions. While imprisoned, he researched the economics of prisoner jobs and wrote a mini-treatise criticizing prison labor, "Anatomy of the Laundry", which was widely read by inmates.

Melville was among the committee of inmates who helped organize inmates' demands and keep order during the Attica Prison Riot in September 1971. Melville, 28 other inmates, and 10 hostages were shot and killed by state police on September 13, when the uprising was put down by order of Governor Nelson Rockefeller. According to some witnesses, Melville was alive after the initial assault was over and the prison was secure but was shot to death by law enforcement while trying to surrender. The law enforcement officer who shot Melville claimed he had done so because Melville was armed with explosives, but investigators and prosecutors could find no evidence to support this claim and lawyers for surviving prisoners maintained that he was "murdered in cold blood with his hands in the air in surrender".

== Legacy ==
A book was published consisting of the letters he wrote from prison, Letters From Attica, with a foreword by William Kunstler, and additional contributions by Jane Alpert and John Cohen.

On the basis of the text of a letter he wrote on May 16, 1970, Frederic Rzewski wrote a musical composition, Coming Together. The text used is

I think the combination of age and a greater coming together is responsible for the speed of the passing time. it's six months now and i can tell you truthfully few periods in my life have passed so quickly. i am in excellent physical and emotional health. there are doubtless subtle surprises ahead but i feel secure and ready. As lovers will contrast their emotions in times of crisis, so am i dealing with my environment. in the indifferent brutality, incessant noise, the experimental chemistry of food, the ravings of lost hysterical men, i can act with clarity and meaning. i am deliberate--sometimes even calculating--seldom employing histrionics except as a test of the reactions of others. i read much, exercise, talk to guards and inmates, feeling for the inevitable direction of my life.

On August 28, 2000, a federal judge awarded $8 million to the survivors of the Attica uprising. The son of Sam Melville was awarded $25,000, and said he planned to establish an educational fund with the money awarded.
