= Robert Roth (activist) =

American activist (born 1950)

- Born: 1950 (age 75–76); New York City
- Education: Columbia University
- Occupations: Teacher; activist
- Known for: Activism; Student activism Leader, Students for a Democratic Society; Former member of Weather Underground Organization

Robert Roth (born 1950) was an active member of the anti-war, anti-racism and anti-imperialism movements of the 1960s and 1970s and a key member of the Students for a Democratic Society (SDS) political movement in the Columbia University Chapter in New York, where he eventually presided. Later, as a member of the Weatherman/Weather Underground Organization he used militant tactics to oppose the Vietnam War and racism. After the war ended, Roth surfaced from his Underground status and has been involved in a variety of social causes.

He has one grandson, Wolf Mirkinson, star of “The Wolf and Jack podcast,” who has also guest starred in an episode of, Who Smarted, and two granddaughters, Orion and Izzy.

== Early years ==
Roth is the son of a middle-class family in Queens, New York, where he grew up in a progressive Jewish household. He graduated from high school in 1966 at the age of 16. That same year he began studying at Columbia University in New York. In 1969, Roth withdrew from Columbia in order to devote his attention to Students for a Democratic Society, usually referred to as SDS.

== Students for a Democratic Society ==
Roth was recruited to join SDS at Columbia University by Mark Rudd and John Jacobs during his freshmen year at Columbia. In 1969, he was elected leader of SDS when he decided he would not finish school at Columbia and would instead focus on fighting the revolution. That same year he also dropped out of school to avoid disciplinary charges and to commit himself to the organization. He spent that summer working with an SDS community organizing project in the Inwood section of New York City.

Roth sided with black students who opposed building the Columbia University gym in Harlem in 1968, which was intended to grant African Americans limited access to facilities. Roth also opposed the university's contribution to the Department of Defense in the form of research and military recruiting. These oppositions resulted in a series of direct actions, including strikes and building takeovers. He led building occupations at Columbia University. Roth was the contact for the Low library occupation where he noted the "great communal feeling" of those occupying the library during the takeover. The 1968 summer session started with protests led by Roth, then a sophomore, Paul Rockwell and Stuart Gedal. On 116th and Broadway, at the university's gates, Roth led "liberation classes" in which he taught passing students about the matters. In September 1968, Roth held a meeting with other students, Gedal, Josephine Duke and Mike Golash to demand that the Morningside Gym construction stop. Roth demanded Andrew W. Cordier, Columbia's acting President, to end racist and militaristic actions at the university. Roth was part of a group that attempted to force administrators at Columbia University to allow SDS members expelled from school to register for the following term. Roth, as a member of the SDS steering committee, chastised Cordier for refusing to lift the 42 suspensions for the expelled students, as he claimed it signified "an attempt to split our movement."

During his time with the steering committee, Roth, along with 200 other SDS members, participated in the capture of Philosophy Hall at Columbia University on April 17, 1969. On April 17, 1969, and May 1, 1969, Roth participated in taking over and barricading the halls. Roth asserted, "We are showing that University that every time it helps the war in Vietnam we will exact reprisals." This quotation was in response to news that the university was accepting NASA research grants by allowing military recruitment on campus. A later FBI surveillance file from COINTELPRO confirmed that Roth was a participant in the Columbia student strike. He was also identified as a member of SDS and a negotiator for the Low library strikers.

On May 2, 1969, they released control of two buildings: Fayerweather and Mathematics Halls. In 1969, Roth led another Columbia strike. He was arrested on June 10, 1969, found guilty, and he served 30 days in prison in New York City and was fined $100 for disregarding the ban on disruptions on the Morningside campus. Following his release from jail, Roth worked from August to October 1969 on the National Action Staff (NAS) for the SDS national office. In this capacity, he helped plan for the coming National Action, also known as the "Days of Rage".

On September 15, 1969, Roth, along with seven other men and women, was arrested for refusing to stop passing out anti-war pamphlets to motorists. Roth, then 19 years old, was charged with obstructing traffic and disorderly conduct. He was fined $100. After his release Roth resumed his work as a member of the NAS on September 17, 1969. He continued discussing plans for activities in Chicago. The Chicago demonstration was discussed as an opportunity to bring their politics to the streets in order to topple the system.

Weatherman had emerged from SDS by late 1969. They sent Roth to Chicago where he noticed the heavy police presence. SDS applied for demonstration permits for a demonstration and march on October 11, 1969, and held a conference at city hall. Roth noted that the deputy mayor would not commit to providing a permit, but assured the people that this demonstration would happen with or without a permit. In the fall of 1969, the 'red squad', a plain-clothes Chicago police squad, formed and focused on Weather activity in Chicago. Multiple accounts say they forcefully entered a Weatherman hide-out and hung Roth out of the window by his ankles in a raid.

== Weather Underground Organization ==
The early months of 1970 saw great change for both Weather and Robert Roth. He recalled, "My sense of justice… and the person I wanted to be were inextricably linked to what happened with African Americans." The news of Fred Hampton's murder in December 1969 provided Roth with a sense of personal responsibility to make a difference. After his time in Chicago, Roth felt Chicago was a war zone which intensified the necessity of Weather's clandestine activity. In response to the Greenwich Village townhouse explosion, where Terry Robbins, Diana Oughton and Ted Gold of Weathermen died. Roth grappled with the morality of pursuing a revolution.

In his years within the Weather Underground, Roth participated in militant activities aimed against US imperialism and racism. Roth participated in Osowatamie, the WUO's short-lived newsletter, beginning in March 1975. He served as the leader of editorial coverage. Roth surfaced and turned himself in to authorities with Phoebe Hirsch on March 25, 1977. He was released on $1,000 bail on 9/13. He later pleaded guilty to mob action charges and received a $1,000 fine and 2 years probation.

== Later life and activism ==
After surfacing from the Weather Underground Organization, Robert Roth moved to San Francisco and joined Prairie Fire Organizing Committee. In the 1980s, Roth worked with the Pledge of Resistance, a movement dedicated to ending US intervention in Central America.

In 1992, Roth and Pierre Labossiere were co-founders of the Haiti Action Committee in San Francisco, which strongly opposed a US-supported coup against Haitian President Jean-Bertrand Aristide. He remains a member of the Haiti Action Committee. Roth spoke on September 18, 2007, at a rally protesting the kidnapping and disappearance of Haitian human rights activist Lovinsky Pierre-Antoine, as well as the ongoing repression in Haiti.

He co-authored activist pamphlets: "Hidden From the Headlines: the US War Against Haiti" and "We Will Not Forget: the Achievements of Lavalas in Haiti."

Roth worked as a high school social studies teacher and community activist at Mission High School in San Francisco for 30 years. He can be seen in the film It's Elementary, which focuses on teaching gay issues in schools. The film aired on PBS. He retired from teaching in 2018.

== Sources ==
- Berger, Dan (2007). Outlaws of America: the Weather Underground and the Politics of Solidarity. Oakland, CA: AK Press
- Jacobs, Ron (1997). The Way the Wind Blew: A history of the weather underground. London; New York: Verso
- Fox, Sylvan. Columbia Opens Summer Sessions. (1968, June 11) New York Times
- Fox, Sylvan. Radical Students See Cordier. (1968, September 17) New York Times
- Fox, Sylvan. Student Rebels Disrupt Columbias Registration. (1968, September 19) New York Times
- Kihss, Peter. Columbias Student Strike Led By Several Different Groups. (1968, May 18) New York Times
- Ninety Fourth Congress (1975) The Weather Underground: Report of the Subcommittee to investigate the administration of the internal security oact ond other internal security laws of the committee on the judiciary United States Senate. (Stock No. 052-070-02727-4) Washington, DC: U.S. Government Printing Office.
- Scherr, Judith. SF rally calls for end of occupation. (2005, March 8) San Francisco Bayview Newspaper
- Six war protesters fined. (1970, February 20) New York Times
- Terrall, Ben (2007) http://www.dissidentvoice.org/2007/10/un-occupation-of-haiti-continues
- Thurgood Marshall Academic High School page.. Retrieved november 4, 2008
- Varon, Jeremy (2004). Bringing the War Home. Berkeley: University of California Press
- "Weatherman Underground" (PDF). FBI (20 August 1976) Pages 83, 110. Retrieved on October 20, 2008.
- Wilkerson, Cathy (2007). Flying too Close to the Sun: My life and times as a weatherman/ Cathy Wilkerson. New York: Seven Stories Press
- York, Anthony (2000). Wanted: A real criminal. Salon.com. Retrieved October 21, 2008
- "Aging Radical Comes Home", Time, September 26, 1977. Retrieved October 26, 2008
