= Brian Flanagan =

American former member of the American radical left organizations SDS and WUO

- Born: Manhattan, New York
- Known for: Former member of the 1960s radical left group Weather Underground

Brian Flanagan is an American former militant and activist who was a member of the radical left organizations Students for a Democratic Society (SDS) and the Weather Underground Organization (WUO).

== Early life ==
Flanagan was raised in Manhattan, New York. His father was an advertising executive and his mother a teacher, stockbroker, and antique dealer. His parents, who supported Adlai E. Stevenson, the Democratic governor of Illinois who was an unsuccessful presidential candidate in 1952 and 1956, introduced Flanagan to politics.

Flanagan felt attracted to militancy as a child already, later recalling that "from a fairly early age, 11 or 12, I had really come to admire Fidel Castro. When he stood up to the United States, I thought that was a great thing."

== Columbia University ==
During the 1960s, Flanagan attended Columbia University in New York, where he was a member of Students for a Democratic Society (SDS). Flanagan studied philosophy and economics at Columbia where he was a C student. He describes the protests against the Vietnam war as "the turning point" for him, recalling how "being in New York, being at Columbia during the Vietnam War, you could not be oblivious to what was going on. People were lining up on one side or the other. And so I took my stand." The 1968 Columbia Student Revolt involved students shutting down the campus by seizing buildings to attract attention for their cause, and Flanagan was one of the members that helped seize the mathematics building. In 1969, Flanagan joined Weatherman, a radical splinter group of the SDS, later known as the Weather Underground Organization (WUO).

== Days of Rage ==
On October 8, 1969, Weatherman staged its first act of public aggression, at a rally in Chicago called the Days of Rage. The rally was staged in opposition to the Vietnam War, and its slogan was "Bring the War Home". Members gathered at Grant Park to listen to speeches by SDS leaders about Che Guevara and the world revolution. The rally turned to the streets of Chicago, where participants vandalized businesses, smashed car windows and blew up a statue of a policeman known as the Haymarket statue. During the rally, Flanagan had a physical encounter with then 35-year-old lawyer Richard Elrod that left Elrod with a broken neck and partially paralyzed from the neck down. Both men report different testimonials of what transpired that day. Flanagan stood trial for "attempted murder, aggravated battery, felonious mob action, and resisting arrest" and was acquitted on all charges. Michael Rollins, a reporter for WCFL who was interviewing Elrod just before Elrod broke away to chase Flanagan, supported Flanagan's description of what happened. Although he told his story to the police and the state's attorney's office, he was never called before the grand jury. Richard Hinchion, 43, an insulating contractor from Munster, Indiana was another eyewitness supporting that version.

== Weather Underground Organization ==
On March 6, 1970, Diana Oughton, Terry Robbins, and Ted Gold, members of Weatherman died in a Greenwich Village townhouse explosion when a nail bomb detonated after members purchased two 50-pound cases of dynamite. It was explained later that the bombs were to be detonated at a non-commissioned officers' dance at Fort Dix. In an interview, Flanagan suggested that he helped one Weatherman member, Kathy Boudin, who later served 22 years in prison for felony murder and robbery, flee New York City after police investigations placed her in the townhouse during the time of the explosion. Following the townhouse deaths, many members of Weatherman went into hiding, forming Weather Underground Organization, said to be responsible for a series of bombings of US state and federal buildings between 1970 and 1975.

In the documentary film The Weather Underground, Flanagan admits to participating in Weather's bombings during the 1970s. During a memorable moment in the film, Flanagan states, "When you feel you have right on your side, you can do some horrific things". After resurfacing from the underground, Flanagan joined the Prairie Fire Organizing Committee, the above-ground wing of Weather Underground Organization.

== Foreign travel ==
The FBI surveillance files on Weatherman reported that on October 20, 1970, Flanagan was in Algeria meeting with Eldridge Cleaver, fugitive Black Panther Party leader. While in Algeria, Flanagan also met with Jennifer Dohrn, the sister of Bernardine Dohrn, along with Stew Albert and Jerry Rubin, two members of the Yippies.

== Post-Weatherman life ==
In the 1990s, Flanagan played pool on a professional billiards circuit and worked as a carpenter and bartender. In 1996, he won $23,000 as a contestant on the television game show Jeopardy!. Flanagan continued his interest in trivia, hosting a weekly trivia contest at his bar, the Night Café in Manhattan, which he ran for fifteen years. The Night Cafe closed in September 2007.
