= Prairie Fire Organizing Committee =

American communist organization that emerged from Weather Underground

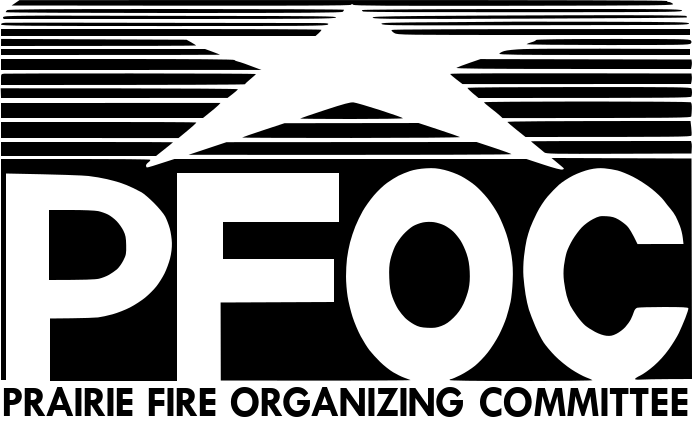
- Predecessor: Weather Underground
- Formation: 1978
- Defunct: 2006
- Location: 2502 West Division Street, Chicago, Illinois 60622-2804
- Website: prairiefire.org

The Prairie Fire Organizing Committee (PFOC), also called the Prairie Fire Collective (PFC), was an American communist organization. PFOC emerged in 1978, after the Weather Underground Organization splintered into an "aboveground" faction (to become PFOC) and an "underground" faction (to become the May 19th Communist Organization).

PFOC last published in 2002. PFOC's website was last updated in 2006 and went offline in 2014.

== Ideology ==
Prairie Fire Organizing Committee regards American imperialism as the main enemy of the world's people, a position it initially took in contradiction to the Chinese Communist Party's critique of Soviet imperialism following the Sino-Soviet split. They claim a long history of fighting for rights of all people and opposes white supremacy in all its forms, believing that it persists through practices such as racial profiling. PFOC demanded the release of political prisoners in the United States, writing: "We know that close to 100 women and men are in U.S. prisons because they have dared to struggle for the liberation of oppressed peoples". The group's members are typically activists fighting U.S. imperialism. Their work proceeds from the premise that, while the U.S. remains in the global position that it currently occupies, there will be no freedom or peace for anyone.

The book Prairie Fire was explicitly feminist, based on an understanding that success of imperialism relied on the oppression of women. One result of this point of view was the creation of childcare teams which collectivized the labor of raising children within the organization.

== History ==
=== Origins ===
In 1974, the Weather Underground released the book Prairie Fire: The Politics of Revolutionary Anti-imperialism. Since the Weather Underground was engaged in illegal bombings and its leaders were fugitives, it required help from aboveground supporters to distribute the book; participants in this work included Van Lydegraf and Bernardine Dohrn. Over 40,000 copies were distributed. Discussion groups were created to discuss the issues that arose from the book. This above ground organizing is how the Prairie Fire Distribution Committee was created, which in 1975 became the Prairie Fire Organizing Committee.

The book's preparation was a 12-month process. It was written collaboratively and adopted as the collective statement of the Weather Underground. Mark Rudd stated that the book "was an attempt to influence the movement that we had abandoned back in 1969. It tried to reach many thousands of New Leftist and former New Leftists by saying "'Don't despair, we're all part of the same thing'". Bill Ayers explains that Prairie Fire "was an attempt to sum up our thinking since the 'Weatherman' paper and especially since the townhouse. Through it we hoped to consolidate our political organization and to forge unity with progressive activist". Ayers is referring to the 1970 Greenwich Village townhouse explosion which killed 3 members of Weatherman, Diana Oughton, Theodore Gold, and Terry Robbins.

=== Subsequent history ===
Much of the work of Prairie Fire focused on international solidarity. In 1976, the Committee joined the "July 4th Coalition" which was a larger solidarity alliance of a variety of leftist organizations including the Palestine Liberation Organization and the Puerto Rican Solidarity Committee as part of an effort of organizing counterdemonstrations for the official U.S. governmental commemorations of the Bicentennial.

Since 1977, PFOC produced the journal Breakthrough. Fireworks Graphics Collective, a Bay area printing collective, was their graphic production wing. Fireworks produced posters for international solidarity movements, women's liberation movements, LGBT issues, release of political prisoners, and more.

In 1979, the victory of the Sandinistas in Nicaragua and the FMLN-led "people's war" in El Salvador put the ideals of a just society at the center of attention. In the 1980s, a large solidarity movement developed in the U.S. in response to America's military intervention in Central America. Prairie Fire Organizing Committee actively participated in these efforts.

In 1980, the U.S. government arrested eleven Puerto Rican members of the Fuerzas Armadas de Liberacion Nacional (FALN, the Armed Forces of National Liberation) who were committing acts of terrorism to gain independence for Puerto Rico. Prairie Fire worked as allies with the Puerto Rican independent movement to demand the release of these prisoners.

Since 1984 Prairie Fire has been active in the annual International Women's Day celebration that is held on March 8 in Chicago. Members participate in marches and programs based around the event.

In the 1990s, Prairie Fire joined WAC, the Women's Action Coalition, to take direct action against sexism by fighting for women's rights to their bodies and access to women's clinics.

In 1996, Prairie Fire initiated the Not On The Guest List Coalition which organized a demonstration at the Democratic National Convention in Chicago. It was a demonstration that focused its attention on capital punishment in the United States, racism and classism within the criminal justice system, and for the release of political prisoners held within the U.S. prisons. Prairie Fire has also worked to oppose the 2003 Iraq War, and on other societal issues in the US and abroad.

== Works ==
=== Books ===
- Prairie Fire: The Politics of Revolutionary Anti-Imperialism: The Political Statement of the Weather Underground. San Francisco: Communications Co., 1974.

=== Journals ===
- Breakthrough San Francisco: John Brown Book Club, 1977–.
