= Cathlyn Platt Wilkerson =

American far-left radical (born 1945)

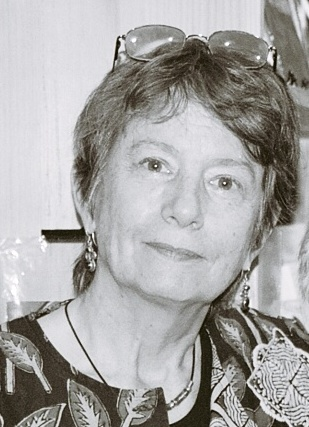
- Wilkerson in 2007
- Born: January 14, 1945 (age 81)
- Citizenship: USA
- Education: Swarthmore College (1966)
- Occupation: teacher
- Known for: 1970s Weather Underground radical, bomb maker, fugitive
- Children: 1
- Parent(s): James Platt Wilkerson, Audrey Olena

Cathlyn Platt Wilkerson (born January 14, 1945), known as Cathy Wilkerson, is an American far-left radical who was a member of the 1970s radical group called the Weather Underground Organization (WUO). She came to the attention of the police when she was leaving the townhouse belonging to her father after it was destroyed by an explosion on March 6, 1970. Members of WUO had been constructing a nail bomb in the basement of the building, intending to use it in an attack on a non-commissioned officers dance at Fort Dix, New Jersey that night. Wilkerson, already free on bail for her involvement in the Chicago "Days of Rage" riots, avoided capture for 10 years. She surrendered in 1980 and pleaded guilty to unlawful possession of dynamite. She was sentenced to up to three years in prison and served 11 months.

== Early years ==
Cathlyn Platt Wilkerson was born on January 14, 1945. Her father, James Platt Wilkerson, was an advertising executive and part-owner of a radio station in Omaha, Nebraska from the Midwest. Her mother, Audrey Olena Wilkerson, graduated from Smith College and later took a job as a teacher in Manhattan. Cathy Wilkerson grew up in Connecticut and Massachusetts. In Stamford, Connecticut she attended Martha Hoyt School through 3rd grade, Emma Willard Middle School (5th grade), and New Canaan Country School (6th through 9th grade). In Andover, Massachusetts, she attended Abbot Academy, an all-girls school. She graduated from Abbot Academy in June 1962.

== Early activist work ==
After graduating from high school, Wilkerson was accepted into Swarthmore College. During the first year of college she became interested in politics. In April, 1962 Wilkerson became involved with a civil rights group that organized anti-segregation work in Cambridge, Maryland. Her activist work continued throughout college. Aged 18, in June 1963, she attended Students for a Democratic Society (SDS) National Meeting in Pine Hill, New York, and wrote a pamphlet Rats, Washtubs, and Block Organizations. She graduated in June 1966 and spent summer and fall working for Representative Robert Kastenmeier, a liberal Democrat from Wisconsin. In 1967, Wilkerson was employed in the national office of SDS, in Chicago and became the editor of New Left Notes, an SDS newspaper. In 1967, she was elected into SDS National Interim Council and moved to Washington, D.C. to set up a regional office.

Wilkerson and three other SDS members went to Cambodia where they met representatives of Vietnamese National Liberation Front. After the trip she wrote several articles describing her experiences and stressing the issue of failing morale of U.S. troops. Although, as Wilkerson recalls in her memoir, she had few disagreements with the main ideas promoted by the Weathermen, including their deep desire to be involved in the most effective endeavor to end the Vietnam War. Her perception that policies both at home and abroad were unfair prompted her to become a member of Weatherman in 1969. Shortly after her graduation from college, Wilkerson traveled to Cuba to witness the results of the Cuban Revolution first hand. She was active in civil rights and the women's movement. However, she put anti-war and anti-racist work before the women's movement. In 1969, the New Left was present at a Counter-Inaugural to Richard Nixon's first inauguration, at which the anti-war leader Dave Dellinger, serving as master of ceremonies, incorrectly announced, "The women have asked all the men to leave the stage."

After that, SDS activist Marilyn Salzman Webb attempted to speak about women's oppression, and SDS men heckled her, shouting, "Take her off the stage and fuck her!" and so forth until she was drowned out. Later, Webb received a threatening phone call which she thought was from Wilkerson, but that was not confirmed, and it may have been from a government agent. In any case, the call contributed to driving apart outspoken feminists in the national SDS and people who put anti-racist and anti-war work before feminism and went toward the Weathermen.

== Arrests ==
In 1963, Wilkerson was arrested in Chester, Pennsylvania for distributing handbills advertising a mass meeting to discuss the planned boycott of the public schools. On August 25, 1968, she was arrested during the Democratic National Convention and charged with disorderly conduct and posting handbills on private property without the owners' permission. On May 2, 1969, Wilkerson was arrested and charged with unlawful entry and destroying property during a takeover of Maury Hall at George Washington University in Washington, D.C. On September 4, 1969, she was arrested in Chicago on charges of disorderly conduct. On September 4, 1969, Wilkerson was arrested in Pittsburgh, Pennsylvania with 25 other female members of SDS, who were trying to recruit students to the anti-war movement by staging a high school "jailbreak". She was charged with inciting a riot, rioting, and disorderly conduct. On October 9, 1969, Wilkerson was arrested and charged with mob action, aggravated battery, and resisting arrest.

== Joining Weathermen ==
Wilkerson joined the Chicago Weatherman Collective during the summer of 1969. She actively participated in riots during the Days of Rage that took place in Chicago on October 8–11, 1969 and was arrested for attacking a Chicago policeman with a club. After spending two and a half weeks in jail, she was released on bail. Wilkerson attended the WUO "War Council" in Flint, Michigan during December 1969. In January 1970 she was sent to Seattle, Washington to join a local collective. After a few days in Seattle Wilkerson was invited by Terry Robbins to come to New York, New York. After firebombing the home of New York State Supreme Court Justice Murtagh, who was presiding over the trial of the so-called "Panther 21" members of the Black Panther Party and few other unsuccessful fire bombings, the New York collective members decided to use dynamite in future actions. The bomb factory was set up in a townhouse owned by Wilkerson's father.

== Greenwich Village townhouse explosion ==
On the morning of March 6, 1970, there was an explosion in the sub-basement of a townhouse owned by Wilkerson's father, located at 18 West 11th Street in Greenwich Village. The blast killed three people, but Wilkerson and Kathy Boudin were helped from the rubble, and they immediately went underground. The townhouse was being used by the Weather Underground to make bombs, in particular a nail bomb that was to be used against soldiers and their dates at a non-commissioned officer's dance at Fort Dix, New Jersey that night. That evening, a man's body was found in the basement of the townhouse, and a short time later, a woman's torso was discovered on the first floor. Police also found several handbags with personal identification that had been stolen from college students over the previous few months. Over the next few days, police discovered at least 60 sticks of dynamite, a live military antitank shell, blasting caps, and several large metal pipes packed solid with explosives and nails as shrapnel.

Three members of the WUO were killed in the explosion: Theodore Gold, the 23-year-old leader of a student strike at Columbia University in 1968; Diana Oughton; and Terry Robbins. Wilkerson and Boudin stayed overnight at Boudin's parents' house a few blocks away on St. Luke's Place before they both went underground. Wilkerson's father, who owned both houses, was on vacation in the Caribbean. She was charged in absentia with illegal possession of dynamite and criminally negligent homicide and eluded capture for 10 years.

== Surrender ==
On July 23, 1970, Wilkerson and twelve other members of Weather Underground Organization were indicted by a federal grand jury on charges of conspiring to bomb and kill. Placed on the FBI's Ten Most Wanted List, some avoided capture for as long as ten years. On March 25, 1977, Phoebe Hirsch and Robert Roth became the first two WUO members to surrender. Wilkerson stayed underground for three more years. She surrendered in 1980 and was tried and convicted of illegal possession of dynamite and sentenced to three years in prison. She was released on a sentencing technicality after serving 11 months, with the judge noting that "her conduct while in jail has been exemplary". New York State's Commissioner of Correctional Services was critical of the early release, calling the judge's action "mistaken". He maintained that many inmates with better disciplinary records remained behind bars because they did not have good lawyers and were black or Hispanic.

== Later years ==
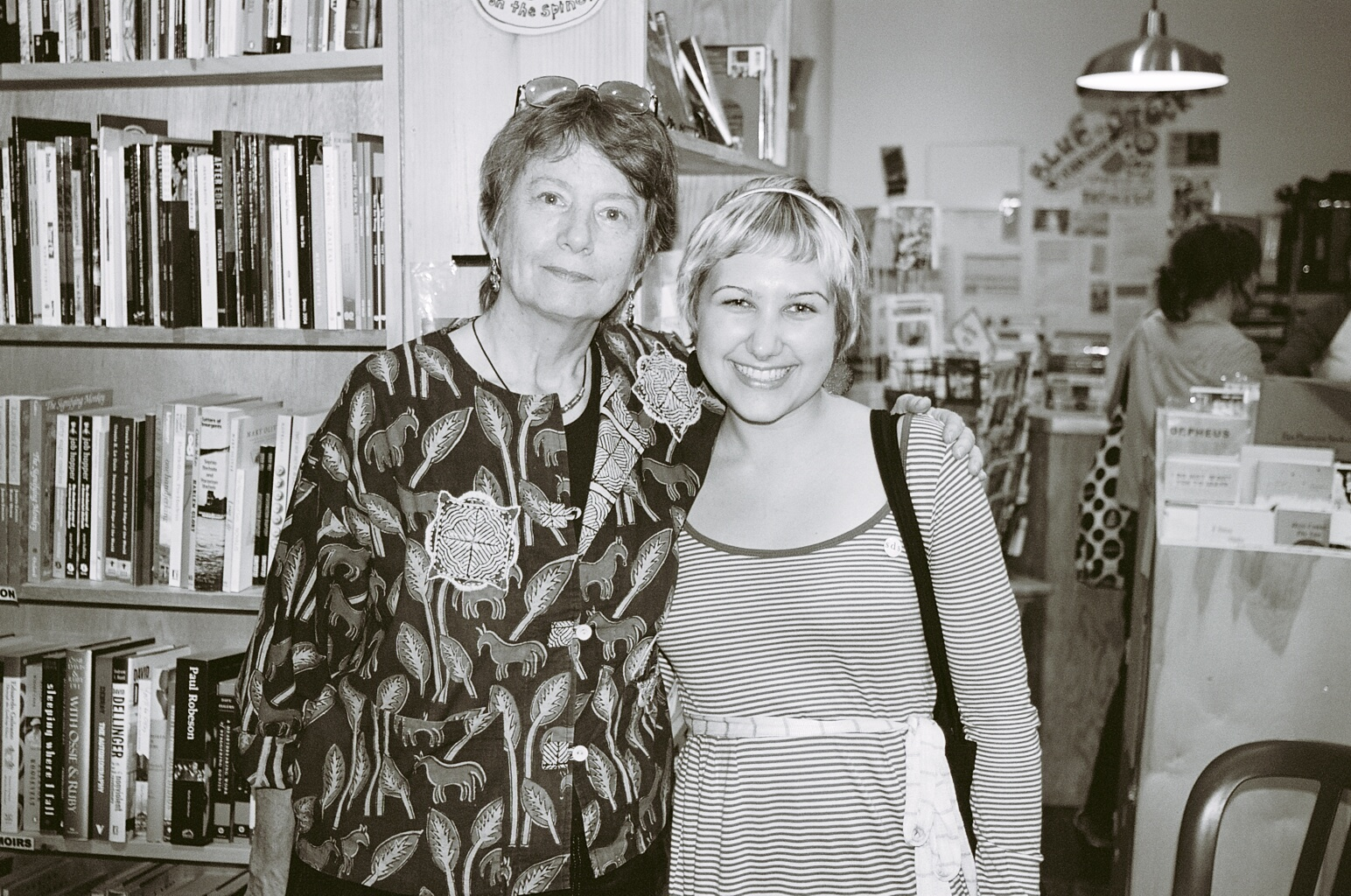
Cathy Wilkerson (left) with Meaghan Linick. Linick is an organizer with Students for a Democratic Society. (2007)

Today, Wilkerson lives in Brooklyn, New York with her partner, criminal defense attorney Susan Tipograph, and is the mother of an adult daughter, Bess, who was born in California while she was underground. Wilkerson spent the last 20 years teaching mathematics in high schools and adult education programs. In August 2003, she gave the first telephone interview after not talking to reporters in about 20 years. Although Wilkerson agreed that mistakes were made, she maintained many of the ideas that she supported in the 1960s. Wilkerson wrote a book about her experience in the Weather Underground, Flying Close to the Sun: My Life and Times As a Weatherman, which was published in 2007.

She criticized the memoir of her former Weatherman Underground colleague, Bill Ayers in ZNet, describing his memoir as, "a cynical, superficial romp … making these struggles seem like a glorious carnival … Ayers relates his relentless sexual encounters without the slightest trace of awareness that some of these encounters might not have been so positive for the woman."

== Books ==
- Wilkerson, Cathy (1964). Rats, Washtubs and Block Organizations. New York, Distributed by Students for a Democratic Society. OCLC 2311381.
- Wilkerson, Cathy (2010). Flying Close to the Sun: My Life and Times as a Weatherman. Seven Stories Press. ISBN 978-1-58322-771-8.
