= Weather High School Jailbreaks =

Direct action by the Weather Underground

- Part of the Opposition to United States involvement in the Vietnam War
- Date: 1969
- Caused by: US involvement in Vietnam; Schooling conditions
- Goals: Promotion of the Days of Rage; Recruit for Weather Underground
- Methods: Demonstration; Occupation

Parties
Weather Underground	Municipal Police; School staff; Angered locals

Jailbreaks were demonstrations staged by members of Weatherman during the summer and fall of 1969 in an effort to recruit high school and community college students to join their movement against the United States government and its policies.

== Purpose ==
Leading up to the Days of Rage event that took place on October 8–11, 1969, the Weatherman collective used various methods of recruiting individuals to join them in Chicago. These demonstrations were intended to recruit high school students to join the organization at the Days of Rage and convince them to join the Weatherman. The institution of school had been specifically identified in the initial Weatherman statement as an oppressor of the youth of America. Weather members felt that the curriculum taught in United States schools promoted values such as sexism and competitive capitalism.

== Notable jailbreaks ==
=== Pittsburgh ===
In September 1969, a group of Weatherwomen, carrying the Vietcong flag, marched on South Hills High School in Pittsburgh. While the mostly white, working-class students were on lunch, the group arrived and distributed leaflets which advertised the Days of Rage. A small group led by Eleanor Raskin interrupted a history class and proceeded to tell the students that what they were being taught by their educational institution was false information. Raskin declared the school a prison and called for the students to join the cause and participate in demonstrations in Chicago in order to bring the war home. A handful of students followed the women as they marched out of the school. By this time the school invasion had attracted the attention of a group of local construction workers. Verbal taunting led to physical skirmishes as the police arrived. Raskin and twenty-five others, including Cathy Wilkerson, were arrested. Charges included rioting, inciting a riot, and disorderly conduct. It was reported (and since disputed) that the women ran through the school topless.

=== Detroit: The "Motor City Nine" ===
Macomb Community College near Detroit was the site of another jailbreak led by a small group of Weatherwomen that included Diana Oughton. Nine women took over a classroom of forty to fifty students in the middle of a sociology final, blocked the door and lectured the class on imperialism and racism. The teacher's attempt to leave and contact the police was halted by the Weatherwomen who had been trained in karate. The "Motor City Nine" were arrested and charged with disorderly conduct and assault and battery.

== Outcome ==
Jailbreaks were only slightly effective for Weatherman recruitment and became more well known for the resulting arrests that occurred. Members of Students for a Democratic Society that had marched and protested alongside Weather members before the two groups split wished to further distance themselves from Weathermen due to their increasingly violent and chaotic methods.

== See also ==
- Weather Underground (organization)
- List of Weatherman actions
- Students for a Democratic Society (1960 organization)
