= James Oughton =

James Oughton may refer to:

- James Adolphus Oughton (1720–1780), British Army officer
- James H. Oughton (1913–1996), American businessman, farmer, and politician
