= Ted Gold =

American activist (1947–1970)

- Born: Theodore Gold; December 13, 1947; New York City, New York, U.S.
- Died: March 6, 1970 (aged 22); New York City, New York, U.S.
- Education: Columbia University
- Known for: student activist vice-chairman of Students for a Democratic Society, Columbia University chapter member of the Weatherman Underground

Theodore "Ted" Gold (December 13, 1947 – March 6, 1970) was a leader of the Columbia University chapter of Students for a Democratic Society who went on to join the Weather Underground. He was one of the leaders of the 1968 Columbia University protests. Gold died in the 1970 Greenwich Village townhouse explosion, when a bomb that other Weather Underground members were building exploded prematurely.

== Early years and education ==
Gold's father was Hyman Gold, a prominent Jewish physician, and his mother was a mathematics instructor at Columbia University. Both had been members of the Old Left. The family lived in a high-rise apartment on Manhattan's Upper West Side.

Gold's parents had experienced economic hardship, but he considered them upper-middle-class. In 1958, before he reached the age of 11, Gold had attended his first Civil Rights demonstration in Washington, D.C. As a boy, he had gone to summer camp with other red-diaper babies at Camp Kinderland (Yiddish for "Children's Land") in upstate New York. From 1959 to 1961, Gold attended Joan of Arc Junior High School (JHS 118) on 93rd Street between Amsterdam Avenue and Columbus Avenue. Gold attended Stuyvesant High School, an elite public high school in Manhattan, where he was a member of the school's cross-country track team, the Stamp Club, and the History and Folklore Society.

Arriving at Columbia University in Fall 1964, Gold immediately became involved in campus Civil Rights movement activity. He organized fund-raising activities for the Student Nonviolent Coordinating Committee (SNCC) Selma Project with Friends of SNCC at Columbia University. Gold identified more with SNCC activists than with any other Civil Rights group.

During his freshman year at Columbia College Gold lived at home with his parents. At the beginning of his sophomore year, he moved into an 8th-floor single dormitory room in Columbia University's Furnald Hall. Initially Gold had planned to major in mathematics at Columbia, but by his junior year in Fall 1966, he had decided that sociology was a more relevant field for him.

By late 1966, Gold had rejected many Old Left cultural and lifestyle values which he had come to regard as too "bourgeois", but he considered himself a Marxist and a communist who sought to establish "decentralized socialism" in the United States. If some other campus leftist would argue against a political position of his by stating that "Lenin wrote", or "Marx said", or "Mao says", Gold would generally reply that "Marxism is a method and a tool, not a dogma".

In November 1966, Gold became active in helping to build a mass-based chapter of the Students for a Democratic Society (SDS) at Columbia.

== SDS activity ==
By March 1967, Gold was the vice-chairman of Columbia SDS. Between late March 1967 and March 1968, he did most of the basic, menial work that was required to keep Columbia SDS functioning as a multi-issue radical student organizing group on campus. He became the most politically influential leader of Columbia SDS's New Left "Praxis Axis" faction, which emphasized education, rather than confrontational direct action, as its primary campus organizing strategy. They distributed materials, held rap sessions in the dorms, protested recruiters, and held referendums.

== Spring and summer of 1967 ==
On April 20, 1967, as Columbia SDS vice-chairman, Gold led 300 anti-war student protesters from a sundial rally into Columbia University's John Jay Hall to demand that the Columbia Administration ban the U.S. Marines from recruiting inside the John Jay Hall lobby. After a group of pro-war right-wing Columbia student athletes attacked the non-violent anti-war protesters inside the lobby, Gold quickly urged Columbia SDS people to retreat from John Jay Hall and return to the sundial rallying point in order to avoid further violence.

When the rally following the right-wing student attack on Columbia SDS people had ended, the Columbia SDS steering committee and Columbia Professor of Sociology Vernon Dibble, who was Columbia SDS's strongest faculty supporter, retreated to the back of the West End Bar on Broadway and 114th Street to plan what to do next.

"You let them push you out of John Jay Hall today. You have to go back there again tomorrow to keep your credibility as a radical student group," Professor Dibble insisted.

Gold and other Columbia SDS leaders all then got into a debate. Everyone agreed that Columbia SDS activists had to go back to confront the Marine recruiters the next day. The major point of debate was whether Columbia SDS would gain more politically and win more mass support by stopping campus Marine recruitment and possibly fighting it out with other students, the right-wing protectors of the U.S. Marines, or by having a more mass-based, non-violent anti-war demonstration directed at protesting the policies of its main political enemy, the Columbia Administration.

"The Administration likes nothing better than to have students fighting other students. Then it can portray itself as "above politics" and as "a neutral". We shouldn't fall into the Administration's trap and alienate all our new mass student support by leading students into a violent confrontation, which is what the Administration now wants us to do," Gold argued.

Gold's views were broadly supported by the rest of the Columbia SDS leadership. Its April 21, 1967 demonstration of the next day was going to be non-violent, disciplined, and focused more on protesting against the Columbia Administration's policies than on the jocks. Martin Luther King Jr.'s Southern Christian Leadership Conference (SCLC) aide, James Bevel, would be invited to address the campus rally. Gold wrote in an open letter from Columbia SDS to the school's faculty after this demonstration that the group was attacked by counterprotestors.

Yesterday a group of 500 students, many of them members of Students for a Democratic Society, marched to John Jay Hall with the intention of questioning the recruiters about Marine atrocities in Vietnam and United States military policy throughout the world. However, a group of self-styled "leathernecks" sought to prevent any such peaceful confrontation. This violent group again and again attacked the anti-Marine demonstrators, who were trying to question the Marines and to keep an aisle open to their table. Several SDS members were injured by this group while trying to keep that aisle open. Since no University official sought to pacify those students whose violent intentions were openly apparent, a riotous situation ensued. One SDS member suffered a broken nose; many others sustained less severe injuries. Full-scale violence was averted only when Dean DeKoff agreed to eject the Marine recruiters.

Following this demonstration, most of the newly politicized and radicalized Columbia SDS supporters returned to their normal academic and hedonistic routines. But Gold and a few other Columbia SDS steering committee "heavies" spent the next few weeks putting together a Columbia SDS publication called New Left Notes: The Journal of Columbia SDS. This SDS newspaper contained articles and columns on the SDS-Marine confrontation, on the 'free speech/freedom to recruit' vs. responsibility to resist Columbia complicity with the war machine controversy, on draft resistance, on the latest Vietnam War escalation and on Columbia's connection to the Pentagon's Institute for Defense Analyses (IDA).

At the end of the Spring 1967 term, Gold decided he wanted to move out of his eighth floor Furnald Hall dormitory room and into an off-campus apartment during his senior year. Columbia SDS founder David Gilbert also needed new living space in September 1967. It was agreed that Gold and Gilbert and another Columbia SDS activist, Bob Feldman, would rent an off-campus apartment together during the 1967-1968 academic year.

After visiting Berkeley, California, and the West Coast in early June 1967, Gold returned to his Furnald Hall room by July 1967 and, for the second year in a row, worked as a summer group counselor of inner city high school students in Columbia University's "Double Discovery" tutoring program. Gold also organized with other Columbia SDS activists on the Upper West Side a "Vietnam Summer" anti-war off-campus summer organizing project.

Patterned after the Freedom Summer campaign of 1964, "Vietnam Summer" was a nationwide student anti-war campaign to raise off-campus consciousness about current events in Vietnam. SDS activists around Columbia set up tables on the sidewalks and canvassed Upper West Side apartment buildings.

In late July 1967, Gold and other Columbia SDS steering committee people started to meet in the high-rise apartment on LaSalle Street of the two Columbia SDS activists who were already married, Peter and Linda Schneider, a few blocks from Columbia's campus. Political strategy for the coming 67-68 school year was discussed. Nearly all the people attending these meetings were "Praxis Axis" people. Columbia SDS activist Bob Feldman brought to one of the meetings new research about IDA's involvement in "Project Agile" which directly related to weapons research for Vietnam War operational activity. There was also much theoretical discussion about New Left political strategy and Columbia SDS chapter internal organization and education. Peter Schneider, Columbia SDS Chairman Teddy Kaptchuk and Gold, especially, seemed to feel that too great a gap existed between the political consciousness level of Columbia SDS's leadership and that of its rank-and-file. Each felt that in the 67-68 academic year a special effort should be made to involve rank-and-file members in smaller groups to maximize their participation in Columbia SDS chapter activity.

In the summer of 1967, Monthly Review published an English translation of Régis Debray's Revolution In The Revolution?, which argued in support of Che Guevara's "foci theory of revolution". Near the end of the summer, a New York SDS regional organizer named Halliwell appeared at one meeting to make the case for applying Debray's theory of "mobile tactics" to Columbia University conditions, with Columbia SDS acting as the non-violent equivalent of Che's "guerrilla foci group". According to Halliwell's analogy, the mass of Columbia students, like the mass of Latin American peasants, could only be aroused if Columbia SDS developed the capacity to act off-campus as a mobile non-violent guerrilla foco at anti-war demonstrations. In Halliwell's view, Columbia SDS should continue to use its usual educational methods to persuade future members of the new working class (the mass of Columbia University student "peasants") to become off-campus demonstrators who pushed the U.S. anti-war movement "from protest to resistance" by their mobile tactics. In July 1967, however, Gold seemed only lukewarm about having Columbia SDS adopt some variant of Halliwell's "Debrayist" organizing strategy.

In late July 1967, Gold was still thinking of going to graduate school in London, following his scheduled June 1968 graduation from Columbia College, in order to please his mother. He thought that he would be able to get a good recommendation from Columbia Professor of Sociology Silver, who was still Gold's favorite professor at Columbia at this time. In July 1967, Gold had also become romantically involved with a recent Barnard College graduate named Trude Bennett, who was also working during the summer as a "Double Discovery" project counselor.

By the beginning of August 1967, Gold felt that the urban riots of that summer indicated that the mass of African-American people had outgrown Martin Luther King Jr.'s pacifist political line and the original nonviolent stance of the Student Nonviolent Coordinating Committee, and were moving more in the direction that Malcolm X, Stokely Carmichael and the SNCC had predicted people would move. On WKCR, the Columbia student radio station, Gold was invited to do a 15-minute weekly political commentary show that summer, in which he explained why he felt the black urban rebellions were justified.

== Fall 1967 to 1969 ==
In September 1967, Gold moved most of his books and record albums from his parents' apartment to the West 94th Street apartment he now rented with Gilbert and Feldman. But by early October 1967, Gold was mainly living with Bennett in her West 108th Street apartment, and by December 1967, he had completely moved out of the West 94th Street apartment and into Bennett's apartment. At the October 21, 1967, anti-war march on the Pentagon, Gold and Bennett both joined the sit-in at the Pentagon and were arrested, although Gold had previously felt that National SDS's 1967 strategy of emphasizing local organizing, rather than organizing for semi-annual national anti-war marches, made the most strategic sense. In explaining why he decided to participate in the October 21, 1967, non-violent mass sit-in at the Pentagon, Gold observed a few days later: "Sometimes spontaneous events happen that you have to take part in, even if it doesn't fit directly into a local organizing strategy. Being radical means being in the front line when masses of people are in motion."

The following month, Gold and Columbia SDS activist Mark Rudd were arrested in midtown Manhattan on November 14, 1967, for chanting through a bullhorn and encouraging anti-war demonstrators to go "block the limousines" in the streets and "block the rush-hour" traffic near the Hilton Hotel to protest the presence of U.S. Secretary of State Dean Rusk at a Foreign Policy Association gathering that was being held at the hotel. Gold and Rudd were taken to the 100 Centre Street jail and charged with "incitement to riot" but, due to the efforts of the National Lawyers Guild, they were soon released and the charges were later dropped.

In his 2010 book, Mohamed's Ghosts, journalist Stephan Salisbury observed: "The FBI began gathering information on" Gold "in earnest in 1967." Gold's FBI files, according to Salisbury, "stacked on a table, stand at least a foot high;" and they are "full of descriptions of meetings, speeches, names of friends, telephone numbers, organizations--all meticulously detailed by Bureau agents, informers, and memos derived from electronic surveillance."

After Mark Rudd was elected as Columbia SDS Chairman in late March 1968, Gold was placed on disciplinary probation by the Columbia Administration, along with five other anti-war students (including Rudd), for demonstrating inside Low Library to protest Columbia University's institutional sponsorship of the Pentagon's Institute for Defense Analyses weapons research think-tank. To protest the Columbia Administration's repression of "The IDA Six", on April 23, 1968, Gold, Rudd, and other SDS activists helped lead protests in which five Columbia University buildings were seized by over 700 anti-war Columbia and Barnard students.

Following his suspension for his political activity during his senior year at Columbia in May 1968, Gold enrolled in a summer teachers training course. During the 1968-69 year, he worked as both a teacher in a private school and as a New York Regional SDS organizer of anti-war radical teachers for the newly formed Teachers for A Democratic Society (TDS) group.

== Death ==
In 1969, Gold joined the Weatherman faction of Columbia SDS. Gold had become more militant after a visit to Cuba, during which he and some other U.S. anti-war activists met with representatives of the North Vietnamese government.

Five months after the Weatherman faction's October 1969 "Days of Rage" protests in Chicago, Gold died on March 6, 1970, in the Greenwich Village townhouse explosion at 18 West 11th Street in Greenwich Village, New York City. Diana Oughton and Terry Robbins also died in this explosion, in which Robbins and Oughton were building a nail bomb intended for a Fort Dix military dance event. Kathy Boudin and Cathy Wilkerson both survived the explosion. Gold was crushed to death by the building's façade, which killed him as he returned to the townhouse. Susan Braudy's writes that Gold was returning from the Strand Bookstore. John Jacobs, the other member of the collective, was not present and went underground after the blast.

After the 1970 bombing, many members of the Weathermen were on the FBI's "most wanted" list. At the end of 1969 the Weathermen had changed their name to "Weather Underground Organization" as its members went underground, living beyond the reach of the law.
