= Greenwich Village townhouse explosion =

1970 accidental detonation of bomb in New York City, U.S.

Coordinates: 40°44′03″N 73°59′45″W

- Firemen contain blaze caused and fed by gas lines broken in the explosion
- Location: 18 West 11th Street, New York City, U.S.
- Date: March 6, 1970; 11:55 a.m. (Eastern Standard Time)
- Attack type: Premature explosion
- Weapon: Dynamite during bomb assembly
- Deaths: Theodore Gold, 22; Diana Oughton, 28; Terry Robbins, 22
- Motive: Opposition to U.S. involvement in Vietnam

The Greenwich Village townhouse explosion occurred on March 6, 1970, in New York City, United States. Members of the Weather Underground (Weathermen), an American leftist militant group, were making bombs in the basement of 18 West 11th Street in the Greenwich Village neighborhood, when one of them exploded. The resulting series of three blasts completely destroyed the four-story townhouse and severely damaged those adjacent to it, including the then homes of actor Dustin Hoffman and theater critic Mel Gussow. Three Weathermen—Ted Gold, Diana Oughton and Terry Robbins—were killed in the blast, while two survivors, Kathy Boudin and Cathy Wilkerson, were helped out of the wreckage and subsequently fled.

Responding firefighters initially believed the blast to have been an accidental gas explosion, but police suspicions were aroused by the two survivors' apparent disappearances, and by that evening other bombs the Weathermen had built were found. They had been meant for several targets: a noncommissioned officers' dance at Fort Dix in South Jersey that night, and the administration building at Columbia University. The unexploded dynamite found in the ruins could have destroyed all the houses on both sides of the block had it detonated in the blast. Robbins and Oughton were in the basement building the bomb intended for Fort Dix, later described as the largest explosive device ever found in Manhattan, when it exploded prematurely; Gold had just returned from running an errand and was killed by the collapse of the building's facade. Boudin and Wilkerson were on the upper floors and survived with only minor injuries. It took nine days of searching to find the explosives and bodies; Oughton and Robbins' were so badly dismembered that they had to be identified through dental records.

The two survivors, already facing assault charges in Chicago for their actions during the Weathermen's Days of Rage there the preceding October, were charged with unlawful possession of dynamite. After their bail in the Chicago case was revoked when they failed to show up for trial shortly after the explosion, Boudin and Wilkerson remained fugitives from justice for a decade. Wilkerson voluntarily surrendered in 1980 and served 11 months in prison on the charge. Boudin eventually was apprehended in 1981 and pleaded guilty to felony murder and robbery in the Brink's case in exchange for a sentence of 20 years to life in prison.

Robbins was recalled as an inexperienced bombmaker who refused to take any suggestions that might have improved safety and stuck to the way he had been told to build the bombs. He had hoped that the bombings would do serious damage and inflict enough casualties for the Weathermen to be taken seriously by their putative allies in the Black Panthers as revolutionary opponents of the Vietnam War and institutionalized racism, since the group's previous bombings had generally done little more than inconvenience their targets. The self-destructive failure of their plot had the opposite effect: most of the members left, and most support from the greater radical left-wing community evaporated. Those who remained, including Wilkerson, learned more about explosives and bombmaking; their campaign continued for another six years. After the townhouse explosion the Weathermen sought to avoid inflicting casualties in their bombings. A new, modernist house similar in appearance was built on the site in 1978; its value has risen into the millions.

== Background ==
The Weather Underground had been formed from the remnants of Students for a Democratic Society in June 1969, by about a hundred activists who had come to believe that armed struggle was necessary to reform American society. At that meeting, the Weathermen, who had taken their original name from the line "You don't need a weatherman to know which way the wind blows" in Bob Dylan's 1965 song "Subterranean Homesick Blues" had discussed what actions they might take, and against what targets. The consensus was that the police and the military were legitimate targets, representing the urban racism that their allies the Black Panthers most strongly opposed, and the Vietnam War. Members present recall that while the topic of whether their actions would necessarily involve taking life was largely avoided, beyond general agreement that they should not do so indiscriminately, their actions would likely kill police officers and military personnel.

After the meeting, the Weathermen split into three groups, based in San Francisco, New York City and the Midwest, under the leadership of Howard Machtinger, Terry Robbins and Bill Ayers respectively, to plan and carry out bombings. Some participated in the October 1969 Days of Rage protests in Chicago, which led to several arrests of the group's leadership for incitement to riot. They were preceded by the first Weatherman bombing, which destroyed a memorial statue to the city police killed in the 1886 Haymarket affair; no arrests have ever been made.

The three groups worked entirely independently, and competed to carry out the boldest attacks in the belief that doing so would increase support for the group and its actions. Machtinger's group carried out the first Weather Underground bombing, with explosives detonating shortly after midnight on February 13, 1970, during shift change at the Berkeley, California, police headquarters. The pair of bombs caused considerable property damage and injured several officers, one severely, but did not kill any, disappointing the other members. Bombs left by the Midwestern group outside Detroit police headquarters were discovered before they detonated.

In New York, the Weathermen at first attacked police stations and the house of a judge with Molotov cocktails. Robbins wanted to do something bigger, and began planning. When he learned from Cathy Wilkerson that her father, a radio executive with whom she had a difficult relationship, would be away from his Greenwich Village townhouse for several weeks while he vacationed in St. Kitts with her stepmother, he asked her if she could get the key so the Weathermen could have a central place to work from. She told her father, who was planning to sell the house soon so he and his English-born wife could move back to her native country, that she needed a place to recuperate from the flu, and he gave her the key.

=== Building ===
The Wilkersons' Greek Revival (Note: Sometimes described as being in the earlier Federal style) townhouse at 18 West 11th Street was built in 1845, part of a group of contemporary houses on the south side of the street between Fifth and Sixth avenues known as the Brevoort Row after its developer, Henry Brevoort. In the 20th century it was home to a series of prominent New Yorkers, starting in the 1920s with Charles E. Merrill, co-founder of the Merrill Lynch investment bank. His son, poet James Merrill, was born in the house.

In 1930, when James Merrill was five, his father sold the house to Howard Dietz, a Broadway lyricist and film studio executive, leaving the new owner a note wishing him the best of times in "the little house on heaven street." Dietz, composer of the standard "Dancing in the Dark", lived there for more than three decades, with three different wives, becoming known among his neighbors for the lavish parties he threw, where the furniture would sometimes be removed and stored in a van outside so that as many 250 guests could dance all night inside.

Dietz sold 18 West 11th to Wilkerson and his second wife in 1963; the next year Wilkerson celebrated his 50th birthday with another lavish party similar to Dietz's, a masked ball with 50 guests that continued past midnight; Cathy Wilkerson and her sister, both daughters from their father's previous marriage, were among the guests. Mel Gussow, theater critic for The New York Times during that period, who lived next door at 16 West 11th, remembers on several occasions returning from the theater late at night with his wife and seeing a formally dressed Wilkerson greeting guests at the door. Inside the house's 10 rooms, Wilkerson kept his collection of bird sculptures in the panelled library and the antique furniture he restored in the subbasement; the house still had its original Hepplewhite furniture and fireplace mantels. Wilkerson had added a sauna and a fountain with a mirror in the backyard garden.

Gussow was not the only luminary in the neighborhood. Actor Dustin Hoffman (who can be seen in the documentary The Weather Underground (2002) standing on the street after the explosion), his then wife Anne Byrne and her daughter Karina from a previous marriage, whom Hoffman had adopted, lived below them in 16 West 11th; the building was owned by painter Jane Freilicher and her husband Joe Hazan. Susan Wager, a socialite, theater producer and former wife of Henry Fonda, also lived nearby.

=== Preparation and construction ===
The Weathermen purchased a large quantity of dynamite and a number of electric fuses for $60 ($600 in 2025) in New Hampshire in early March. After a meeting they designated three targets, including a noncommissioned officers' dance at Fort Dix, which was due to take place on March 6. It was reported that "arguments went on day and night" in the townhouse, with Kathy Boudin advocating that they kill as many people as possible with anti-personnel bombs. Diana Oughton reportedly had misgivings, although others present say she never showed them. Wilkerson wrote later that she felt powerless to stop what was going on in her father's house. Theodore Gold threatened to kill one close friend after he had a breakdown over the plan at one gathering.

None of the Weathermen had experience with explosives, and Robbins and Wilkerson did not even understand the basics of electricity. They worked up a simple timer and trigger device that lacked any safety features, and packed the dynamite with sharp roofing nails. Robbins was unwilling to deviate from the way he had been told to build the bomb, and unwilling to listen to suggestions from anyone else.

== Explosion ==
Robbins had chosen the dance at Fort Dix as their target; other reports indicate that only some were intended for the dance, with the rest to be detonated inside the administration building at Columbia University. The morning of March 6, he and Oughton were making final preparations in the same subbasement where James Wilkerson restored furniture, while Boudin and Wilkerson, both of whom were due to appear in court in Chicago a few days later over assault charges against them from the Days of Rage, were upstairs cleaning the house in preparation for Wilkerson's parents' return that evening. Other members were preparing their disguises for that night.

Shortly before noon, Gold left to get some cotton balls Robbins needed, according to Wilkerson. She began ironing a sheet and heard Boudin beginning to shower upstairs. A few minutes later, she heard a dull roar from the basement and watched as the carpeted floor broke in several places beneath her, letting through a red glow as shards of broken wood and plaster erupted from it. After a second explosion, the floor collapsed and Wilkerson recalls nothing for a while afterwards.

Anne Byrne Hoffman was returning from an errand via taxi. The driver overshot 18 West 11th, putting her two houses away from the explosion. She had just stepped out of the vehicle when the first explosion occurred; had the driver stopped at the right address they would have been exposed to the full force of the blast. She ran into her house and found the sitter and the family dog terrified; outside the fire had already begun. Gussow's wife and son were at the Fifth Avenue corner; she ran to the house herself after leaving her son with a friend.

The lower floors of the townhouse had been destroyed, and much of the front facade blown out. Other buildings on the street had windows blown out, including the Hoffman home. Inside the remains of the townhouse, Wilkerson regained awareness, covered in dust and soot. She called for Robbins.

=== Immediate aftermath ===
Oughton and Robbins were killed by the blast. Gold was returning to the townhouse and was crushed by the collapsing facade. Wilkerson regained awareness and heard Boudin nearby on the edge of what was now a crater in the basement; the two were able to link hands and escape just as a fire built up behind them. Just after they got out, the fire built up into another explosion, blowing out the wall of Hoffman's house and knocking his desk into the crater. Susan Braudy writes that an FBI agent who had been surveilling the house (posing as an architectural historian) took pictures as the facade collapsed.

A police officer and an off-duty New York City Housing Authority patrolman rushed into the chaos in search of survivors. The latter had heard Wilkerson in the ruins, but after she left he was knocked over by the shockwave from the third blast. Boudin was still naked from the shower and Wilkerson was wearing only jeans as her blouse had been blown off, but neither was seriously injured. Wilkerson told Susan Wager, who described them as "dazed and trembling", that there had been two other people (Note: She was unaware that Gold had returned) in the house at the time. Wager took the two into her house and gave them fresh clothing, including her favorite coat and boots. Both women showered, changed and fled the scene before they could be questioned. Wilkerson later said they took the subway.

Boudin went to her nearby family home, where her mother found her when she returned that evening. Jean Boudin talked about the fire and how it made her angry that the fire department had devoted so much of its resources to saving a wealthy person's home compared to what they sent to burning tenement houses in poor minority neighborhoods. Kathy did not reply; she left that night and her family would not see her, nor have any idea of her whereabouts, for over a decade.

== Investigation ==
Firefighters worked through the rest of the day to extinguish the flames, fed by natural gas from ruptured lines. They initially thought that had been the cause, but a police detective on the scene called Albert Seedman, his superior, and said it seemed unnaturally destructive for a gas explosion. Seedman arrived on the scene and set up a command post with senior firefighters and the FBI. Seedman found it suspicious that the two women known to have survived had not returned to the scene and could not be located.

Gussow, arriving on the scene later, worried that 16 West 11th would also be destroyed. Firefighters allowed the tenants to re-enter the building one at a time and rescue select personal items. "In our apartment," Gussow recalled on the explosion's 30th anniversary, "the walls creaked, as if a ship had been torpedoed and was about to sink beneath the sea." His son's tricycle, recovered from the ruins, was left on the front sidewalk, leading to speculation in the media that one of the victims had been a child. Later, he recalls Hoffman trying to reassure Karina, who was celebrating her fourth birthday that day, that everything would turn out well. "If everything will be alright," she asked, "why are you shaking so hard?"

By 6 p.m. that evening Seedman had been in contact with James Wilkerson and learned his daughter had been staying at the house. The FBI told him that Cathy Wilkerson was a member of the Weather Underground, and he considered the possibility that the explosion had been a bombing, although he could not determine what the motive might have been. That night, with enough of the fire out to enter the site, Gold's crushed body was found; after his identity was confirmed two days later, students at Columbia University, his alma mater, tried to lower a flag on campus to half-staff in his memory when they heard the news.

The police brought in cranes to lift the rubble out; every fragment was taken to the Gansevoort Street pier to be analyzed. The next day the tenants of 16 West 11th were allowed to re-enter and collect more items. The Hoffmans and the Wilkersons were allowed to search through the piles of debris, which the actor recalls as being five feet (150 cm) high, in search of their own misplaced property. There, Anne Hoffman found a coat, which she initially thought was hers, with a map in its pocket showing the tunnels under Columbia.

On the morning of March 10, Oughton's dismembered remains were uncovered; she had been shot through with the roofing nails intended to be packed with the bombs as shrapnel. That evening, police found the actual bomb she and Robbins had been building, a basketball-sized globe of blasting caps and dynamite. Seedman told the media later it was the largest explosive device ever seen in Manhattan; had it detonated it would likely have destroyed the entire block.

With the possibility of other unexploded bombs remaining in the ruins, police evacuated the rest of the block and called in the bomb squad. Searchers discovered a 1916 37-mm anti-tank shell. In the following days, they searched the rubble brick-by-brick and uncovered 57 sticks of dynamite, four 12-inch (300 mm) pipe bombs packed with dynamite, and 30 blasting caps. The pipe bombs and several eight-stick packages of dynamite had fuses already attached. They also found timing devices rigged from alarm clocks, more maps of the tunnel network underneath Columbia, and SDS literature. Police and firefighters in the neighborhood were immediately cautioned not to use their radios for fear they might inadvertently trigger a remote fuse. Investigators described the building as a "bomb factory" and said the bombmakers were evidently wrapping dynamite in tape with nails embedded to act as shrapnel at the time of the explosion. By March 13, Seedman confirmed to the media that "[t]he people in the house were obviously putting together the component parts of a bomb and they did something wrong."

The search for bodies continued for nine days after the explosion, and at Seedman's suggestion Wilkerson's parents made a televised appeal to their missing daughter to avoid needlessly risking the lives of searchers. They asked her to "let us know how many more people, if any, are still left in the ruins of our home", saying "more lives would be needlessly lost and only you have the key". Wilkerson did not respond to the appeals. Fingerprint records were required to identify the dismembered remains of Gold, a leader of the Columbia University protests of 1968, and Oughton, the organizer of the 1969 SDS national convention. Rumors circulated among leftists that the third body was that of Robbins, a leader of the 1968 Kent State University student rebellion and a founder of the Weathermen, who would be indicted the following month along with 11 others for organizing and inciting riots during the Days of Rage.

== Survivors and effect on Weathermen ==
Neighbors positively identified Wilkerson as one of the two women who had been led out of the wreckage. Boudin was not positively identified as the second survivor until some weeks later. Both women were charged with illegal possession of dynamite, as no one in the house had the permit required by New York state law. They forfeited their bail on the Chicago assault charges by failing to appear for trial ten days later.

The police were at a loss to find them; Mark Rudd, another veteran of the 1968 Columbia protests who had joined the Weathermen, did it with one phone call. The next morning he held a meeting of the New York group at a coffeehouse on 14th Street. He made sure they all had safe places to stay and, that weekend, took them for firearms practice upstate to get them out of the city.

News of the blast had a similarly disruptive effect on the other two Weatherman groups; some of the other members thought the explosion had been the result of the police targeting the group. Its total membership declined by two-thirds and it lost much of its support. In May, after the remaining members gathered in San Francisco to confer, Bernadine Dohrn issued a statement in the name of the group declaring war on America, warning that they would "attack a symbol or institution of American injustice" within the next two weeks, and confirming that Gold, Oughton and Robbins had been among its membership. The statement named Robbins as the third body and described Gold, Oughton, and Robbins as revolutionaries "no longer on the move".

The remaining Weathermen resolved to improve their bombmaking skills and began doing research on the subject. Ron Fliegelman was the one Weatherman who had practical experience as a mechanic. "What we were dealing with was a group of intellectuals who didn't know how to do anything with their hands. I did. I wasn't afraid of [dynamite]; I knew it could be handled", he told journalist Bryan Burrough, who called him the Weathermen's "unsung hero", in 2015. He and Wilkerson, who worked with him closely, eventually became romantically involved and had a child together.

The Weathermen's bombing campaign restarted the next fall where it had begun: on the anniversary of the first bombing in October, they again blew up the police memorial statue in Chicago's Haymarket Square. Later that fall they regained some credibility among the radical college left of the era when they facilitated Timothy Leary's escape from prison. (Note: It was reported ten years later that the Weathermen only did so after charging Leary's supporters $22,000 ($182,000 in today's dollars) for the operation.) It continued for six years, subsiding once the Vietnam War ended.

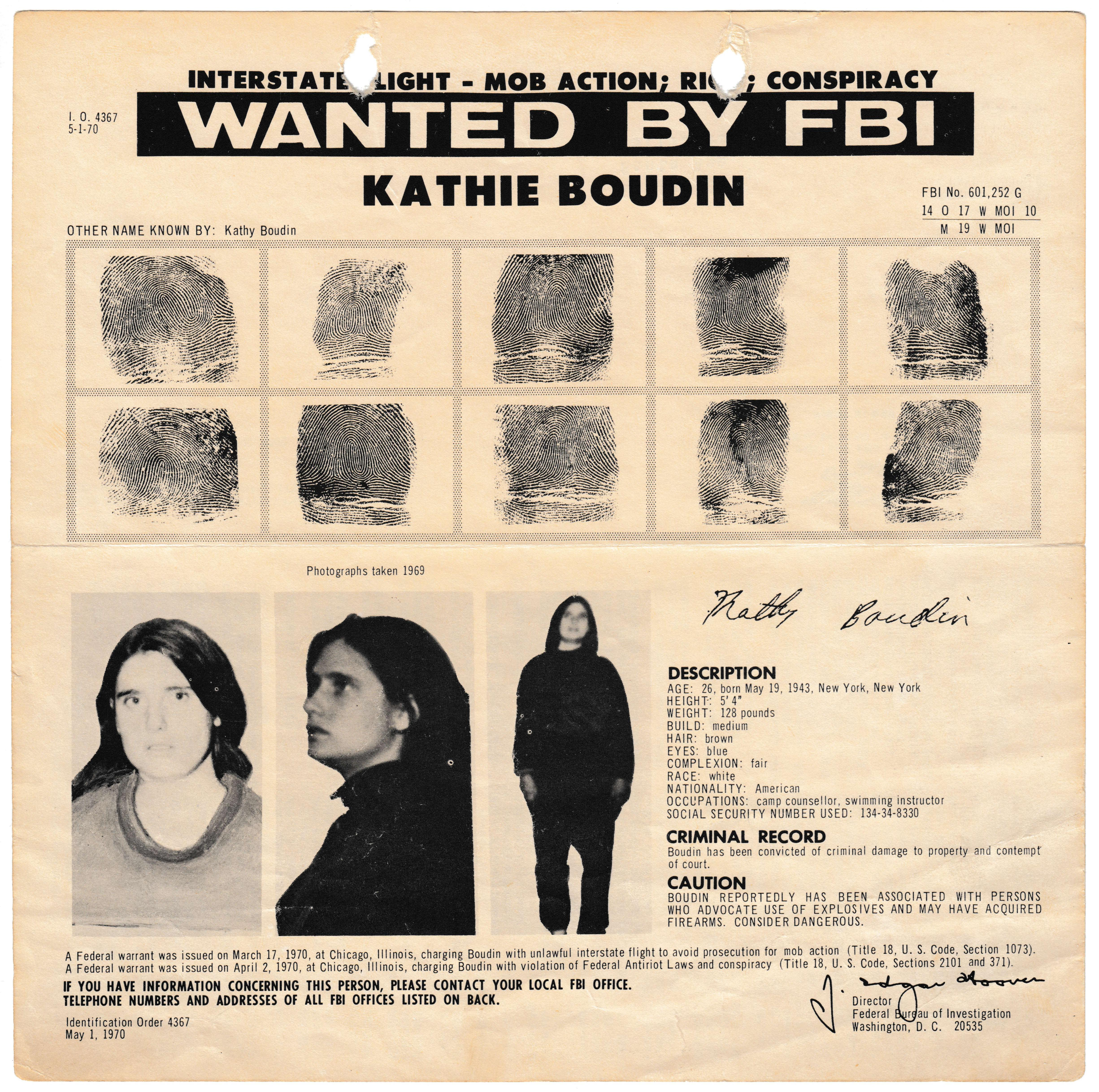
Kathy Boudin FBI wanted poster issued May 1, 1970

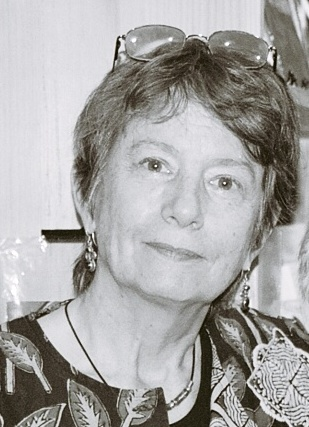
Cathy Wilkerson in 2007

The FBI put Boudin and Wilkerson on its Ten Most Wanted Fugitives list; they remained at large for a decade. Wilkerson surrendered in 1980 and served 11 months of a three-year sentence on the dynamite possession charge, the only criminal prosecution resulting from the explosion. Boudin was apprehended in 1981 for her role in the Brink's armored car robbery and served until 2003. She was later hired by Columbia University as an adjunct professor; she later cofounded the school's Center for Justice and served as its associate director.

== Aftermath and legacy ==
Weather Underground leadership members Bill Ayers, Bernardine Dohrn, and Jeff Jones have claimed the planned bombings of the Fort Dix NCO dance and the other plan to bomb a Columbia University building were a rogue operation led by more extreme Greenwich Village townhouse residents; Ayers singled out Terry Robbins. However, researchers contend that Weather Underground leaders planned and approved the targeting of Fort Dix and Columbia University, along with several other bombings in Detroit that were planned for the same date but were foiled by the Detroit Police with the help of informant Larry Grathwohl.

The Wilkersons decided not to rebuild the house since they had already been planning to sell it. In 2000, when Gussow wrote about the anniversary of the explosion for The New York Times, Wilkerson was living in Stratford-upon-Avon, England, as he and his wife had intended. "Talking to you about this subject is like talking to somebody about a bad case of poison ivy that I had many years ago," he told Gussow. "Possessions are fine, but when the chips are down, they're not all that important" compared to his daughter's welfare, he said. The two had never discussed her involvement in the plot.

None of the tenants in 16 West 11th returned to live there after the explosion. Hoffman told Gussow that the house and neighborhood was, to him, a "chrysalis", where he could take shelter from the aspects of his celebrity. Politically motivated violence "remains an abstraction until it happens to you," he told Gussow. The Gussows moved to nearby West 10th Street, where they still lived in 2000. Gussow wrote that, for years afterward, the family would open an old book or drawer and still be able to smell the fire. Arthur Levin, the resident of 20 West 11th, returned to that house and still lived there as of 2014.

Flowers have been placed in front of the house every March 6 in memory of those killed. "For me, March 6 never passes," Bill Ayers told the Times in 2014, saying he had been the one placing them some years. "For all of us who were part of it, it’s particularly very important to me we don't forget our friends.” Wilkerson told the newspaper that she did not.

James Merrill, the poet who had lived in the house as a young child, lamented the bombing in his 1972 poem "18 West 11th Street", contrasting his own opposition to the war with what he believed to have been the Weathermen's vain decision to oppose it violently, destroying his childhood home along with themselves in the process.

=== Replacement house ===
No part of the house could be salvaged; it had to be completely torn down. Beams were built across the space to shore up the neighboring houses. Architect Hugh Hardy bought the lot from the Wilkersons for $80,000 ($486,000 in 2025), intending to build a modernist take on the original building, with part of the front facade angled, he had designed himself. After eight years in which he was unable to do so, he sold the property at cost to David and Norma Langworthy, a Philadelphia couple looking for a retirement home in the neighborhood where they had lived as newlyweds on the condition they build the house he had designed. They insisted on additional steel support since their previous townhouse, on Philadelphia's Main Line, had burned down after being struck by lightning.

Since the property is in the city-designated Greenwich Village Historic District, the New York City Landmarks Preservation Commission had to approve the design. It was built later that year although not without some controversy at the time; in 2019, Curbed called it "an architectural sore thumb". Under the Langworthys' ownership, the house became locally famous for the seasonally themed Paddington Bear displays Norma Langworthy maintained in the front window after having received the first bear as a housewarming gift in 1980. The subbasement where Oughton and Robbins had been building the bomb when it exploded was used as a laundry room.

David Langworthy died in 1983; his wife lived at 18 West 11th until her own death in 2012. Their family sold the house for $9.25 million in December 2012. The new owner, financier Justin Korsant, planned to renovate the house extensively, including gutting the interior completely and redoing the facade, but after public opposition the LPC rejected the first plan and Korsant decided merely to hire Hardy's firm to restructure and reconfigure the interior, adding a penthouse.

In late 2019 Korsant put the property up for sale, listing it at $21 million.

== See also ==
- Crime in New York City
- List of disasters in New York City by death toll
- Sterling Hall bombing, antiwar terrorist act that killed a University of Wisconsin researcher later in 1970
- Lexington Avenue bombing, similar incident in 1914
