= James H. Oughton =

American businessman, farmer, and politician

Member of the Illinois House of Representatives
- In office 1965–1966

Personal details
- Born: James Henry Oughton Jr. May 14, 1913 Chicago, Illinois, U.S.
- Died: June 11, 1996 (aged 83) Kankakee, Illinois, U.S.
- Party: Republican
- Spouse: Jane Boyce Oughton
- Children: 4, including Diana Oughton
- Education: Dartmouth College
- Occupation: Politician, businessman, farmer

Military service
- Allegiance: United States
- Branch/service: United States Navy
- Battles/wars: World War II

James Henry Oughton, Jr. (May 14, 1913 – June 11, 1996) was an American businessman, farmer, and politician.

Oughton was born in Chicago, Illinois. He lived in Dwight, Illinois for most of his life. Oughton went to the Dwight public schools and to Phillips Exeter Academy. He graduated from Dartmouth College in 1938. Oughton served in the United States Navy during World War II. After the war, he raised a family with his wife, Jane Boyce Oughton, a granddaughter of Boy Scouts of America founder William D. Boyce.

Oughton served as the last administrator of the Keeley Institute in Dwight, Illinois for thirty years until the institute closed in 1965. He was a farmer and was involved with the banking business, served on the Dwight school board, and was a Republican. Oughton served in the Illinois House of Representatives in 1965 and 1966. Oughton died at the Riverside Medical Center in Kankakee, Illinois in 1996, aged 83.

Oughton had four daughters including Diana Oughton of the underground organization Weathermen.
