= Susan Braudy =

American writer

- Born: Susan Orr; July 8, 1941 (age 85); Philadelphia, Pennsylvania, U.S.
- Education: Bryn Mawr College
- Occupations: Author, journalist

Susan Braudy (born Susan Orr July 8, 1941) is an American author and journalist.

== Early life and education ==
Braudy grew up in Philadelphia and later relocated to Manhattan, New York City. She received her undergraduate degree from Bryn Mawr College and attended University of Pennsylvania and Yale University graduate schools, where she studied ethics and aesthetics.

Braudy's father Bernard Orr worked for the Philadelphia Housing Authority and actively supported local artists such as Dox Thrash. He was Vice President of the American Jewish Committee and his Master's thesis at the Wharton School at the University of Pennsylvania became the book Technological Unemployment, an early look at how advances in technology were replacing human labor. He was the principal of a vocational night school whose students were largely African-American. Braudy's mother Blanche Orr taught history at Germantown High School, whose students were also largely African-American, and went back to school to become a reading supervisor because her students needed better reading skills. Braudy now lives with film editor Joe Weintraub.

== Career ==
Braudy has written for The New York Times, Newsweek, The Atlantic Monthly, The Huffington Post, Harper's Magazine, Glamour, Vanity Fair, Ms., New York Magazine, The New Journal, Jezebel and The Week. She was the first woman writer hired by Newsweek.

Braudy had been commissioned by Playboy magazine in 1969 to write an "objective" piece on the feminism movement. Her final article was viewed as controversial by male Playboy editors. The debate continued up to Hugh Hefner; who wrote in a memo (covertly distributed by female Playboy employees) that he felt the article needed to focus more on the "highly irrational, emotional, kookie trend" of feminism because "these chicks [are] the natural enemy of Playboy." He argued that radical feminists were rejecting the Playboy way of life. Braudy later wrote an article published in Defiance and Glamour magazine in which she analyzed the contents of Hefner's memo and criticized his approach to women.

Braudy was an editor and writer at Ms. magazine. She edited the October 1975 men's issue of Ms. whose cover featured Robert Redford's back.

In 1977, Braudy became an associate of the Women's Institute for Freedom of the Press (WIFP). WIFP is an American nonprofit publishing organization. The organization works to increase communication between women and connect the public with forms of women-based media.

In 1981, Braudy was appointed Vice President of East Coast Production at Warner Brothers. She worked as Vice President of Michael Douglas's Stonebridge Production Company from 1986 to 1989. She was hired by Francis Ford Coppola, Jerry Bruckheimer, Martin Scorsese, and Oliver Stone to write screenplays.

Her article on paperback auctions, published in The New York Times Magazine, was used by the Federal Trade Commission for an anti-trust suit against the high-bidder in a multimillion-dollar paperback rights auction.

In 2006, Braudy judged the Lukas Prize, the award from the Columbia University Journalism School and the Nieman Foundation for Journalism at Harvard, given annually to recognize excellence in book-length investigative journalism.

Braudy's fifth book, Family Circle: The Boudins and the Aristocracy of the Left, was nominated for a Pulitzer Prize.

=== Accusations against Michael Douglas ===
On January 18, 2018, Braudy accused former colleague Michael Douglas of sexual harassment in an article for The Hollywood Reporter. She contended that during her time at Stonebridge Productions, she was "subjected to sexual harassment by Douglas that included near-constant profane and sexually charged dialogue, demeaning comments about her appearance, graphic discussions regarding his mistresses," and finally masturbating in front of her.

Douglas had published a preemptive denial of the claims in the Hollywood Star ten days earlier, saying he "felt the need to get ahead" and explain his concerns about the validity of the story. He stated: "I don't have skeletons in my closet, or anyone else who's coming out or saying this. I'm bewildered why, after 32 years, this is coming out, now."

The New York Times published an email from Braudy about her experience working for him. She wrote that Douglas "believed his power was so much greater than mine that he could pull icky/unwelcome sexual pranks without consequence and even take pleasure in my extreme discomfort.”

== In popular culture ==
In 2016, Braudy's reflection on the Playboy incident, "Up Against the Centerfold: What It Was Like to Report on Feminism for Playboy in 1969", was published in Jezebel. Emily Nussbaum of The New Yorker described it as "amaaaazing."

After writing an article for The New York Times about Woody Allen and his writing partner Marshall Brickman, she was used as the muse for Diane Keaton and Meryl Streep's characters in Manhattan. Her jokes about the surreal twist were quoted in the New York Post gossip column "Page Six," as well as in People Magazine.

After she wrote two articles on Seinfeld for The New York Times, writer Larry David named a screaming woman character "Susan Braudy" on his HBO comedy series Curb Your Enthusiasm.

== Books ==
- Between Marriage and Divorce: A Woman's Diary. New York: William Morrow, 1975. ISBN 978-0688029609.
- Old Boyfriends. New York: Jove Publications, 1979. A novelization of the screenplay for the film Old Boyfriends; published only in paperback.
- Who Killed Sal Mineo? A Novel. New York: Simon and Schuster, 1982. ISBN 978-0671610098.
- What the Movies Made Me Do: A Novel. New York: Alfred Knopf, 1985. ISBN 978-0394532462.
- This Crazy Thing Called Love: The Golden World and Fatal Marriage of Ann and Billy Woodward. New York: Alfred Knopf, 1992. ISBN 978-0394532479.
  - Basis for two television episodes on "A Crime To Remember" and "Power, Privilege & Justice."
- Family Circle: The Boudins and the Aristocracy of the Left. New York: Alfred Knopf, 2003. ISBN 978-0679432944.
  - Based on the story of Kathy Boudin, who was imprisoned for her part in the Brink's robbery (1981). Braudy was inspired to write the book because Kathy Boudin had been a classmate at Bryn Mawr.Family Circle got a "largely positive reception" despite being criticized by friends of Kathy Boudin. The book was nominated by Alfred A. Knopf for the Pulitzer Prize. It was later the subject of a 2014 Guardian article criticizing The New York Times and others for republishing findings on the break-in of FBI headquarters in Media, Pennsylvania that damaged J. Edgar Hoover's reputation beyond repair. The break-in's perpetrators had been revealed 11 years prior by Braudy in her nonfiction book.

== Prefaces ==
- Sartre, Jean-Paul Essays in Aesthetics. Transl. Wade Baskin. Pref. Susan Braudy. Open Road Media, 2012. ISBN 9781453228562.
- Gibran, Kahlil. The Treasured Writings of Kahlil Gibran. Pref. Susan Braudy. Open Road Media, 2011. ISBN 9781453235539.
- Gibran, Kahlil. Tears and Laughter. Ed. Martin Wolf. Pref. Susan Braudy. Open Road Media, 2011. ISBN 9781453228531.

== Articles ==
- Braudy, Susan (February 21, 1971). "'And l cry every time you slip in one more dime and let the boy sing the sad one one more time.' James Taylor, a New Troubadour". The New York Times.
- "'Sisters in Misery': What It Was Like to Interview Joan Didion at Home in 1977". March 30, 2017.
