= Diana Oughton =

American social activist and anti-war radical (1942–1970)

- Oughton in 1963
- Born: January 26, 1942; Dwight, Illinois U.S.
- Died: March 6, 1970 (age 28); New York City, New York, U.S.
- Education: Bryn Mawr College, B.A. University of Michigan, M.A.
- Known for: Student activist Teacher at the Children's Community School in Ann Arbor, Michigan; Member of Students for a Democratic Society; Member of Weather Underground

Diana Oughton (January 26, 1942 – March 6, 1970) was an American member of the Students for a Democratic Society (SDS) Michigan Chapter and later, a member of the 1960s radical group Weather Underground. Oughton received her B.A. from Bryn Mawr College. After graduation, Oughton went to Guatemala with the American Friends Service Committee program to teach the young and older Native Americans.

After returning to the U.S., she worked at the Children's Community School in Ann Arbor, Michigan while getting her master's degree at the University of Michigan. She became active in SDS, eventually becoming a full-time organizer and member of the Jesse James Gang. With the split of SDS in 1969, she joined Weather Underground.

Oughton died in the Greenwich Village townhouse explosion in Greenwich Village when a nail bomb she was constructing with Terry Robbins detonated. The bomb was to be used that evening at a dance for noncommissioned officers and their dates at the Fort Dix, New Jersey Army base, to "bring the [Vietnam] war home".

== Early life and education ==
Oughton was born and raised in Dwight, Illinois, the eldest of four daughters. She played the piano and the flute as a child, and enjoyed the operas and plays that her parents took her to see in Chicago.

As a child, Oughton's father taught her to handle a shotgun to be used during the pheasant season with her father at the family's shooting preserve and sometimes in the surrounding countryside of Dwight. Oughton learned to ride horses and had been a 4-H member.

Her mother was Jane Boyce Oughton, and her father was James Henry Oughton, Jr., vice-president of the family bank and owner of a successful restaurant. James Oughton was a member of the Republican Party and was elected to the Illinois General Assembly, serving from 1964 to 1966. One of her paternal great-grandfathers was the founder of Dwight's Keeley Institute for Alcoholics, and another great-grandfather, William D. Boyce, founded the Boy Scouts of America. Her sisters were Deborah Oughton; Carol Oughton Biondi, philanthropist and wife of Hollywood executive Frank Biondi; and the late Pamela Oughton Armstrong.

Diana Oughton left Dwight at the age of 14 to finish her high school education at the Madeira School in McLean, Virginia. In her senior year at Madeira, she was accepted by all of the Seven Sisters colleges. She graduated from high school in 1959, entering Bryn Mawr College as a German-language major. Oughton supported her Republican family's political values by opposing federal banking regulations, social security, and anything associated with big government.

When she was 19, Oughton went to West Germany under a program sponsored by Wayne State University to spend her junior year of college at LMU Munich. She rented a room from Gerhard Weber, the former rector of the university. Oughton became friends with some of the German students, including Peter, with whom she had conversations late into the night. In the family-authorized biography Diana: The Making of a Terrorist, author Thomas Powers noted Diana's recollection of a conversation with Peter that resonated with her: "He said...Hurrah for Socialism!"

After her study abroad, Oughton returned to Bryn Mawr for her senior year. During this time, Oughton and many other students read and were influenced by the book Black Like Me. The author John Howard Griffin gave an account of what he encountered going to the Southern United States, disguised as an African American. The book had a profound effect on Oughton, prompting her to volunteer in 1962 to tutor African-American children in an impoverished section of Philadelphia. She once told her sister Carol how amazed she was that there were seventh graders she was tutoring who could not read.

== Guatemala ==
After receiving her B.A. degree from Bryn Mawr in 1963, Oughton spent the next two years in Guatemala with the American Friends Service Committee program (AFSC). Nearly half the women from Oughton's college senior class had gone on to graduate school. Oughton was assigned to Chichicastenango, at that time an isolated indigenous market town. Oughton went to Guatemala as a liberal, believing that the problems could be identified and solutions devised and carried out. Eventually, she became a radical and began to feel an urgency to change everything at once. While there, Oughton worked with young adults and older indigenous people to teach them to read. She helped local Catholic priests implement nutritional programs and edited a left-wing Guatemalan newspaper. Oughton lived in a small house with a dirt floor and a little outhouse. During this time, the questions with which she had struggled with came to a head. Oughton questioned what to do about poverty, social injustice, and revolution in the world. Oughton came to the conclusion that no matter how many hours were spent working to feed and educate, there would always be more people than jobs to earn wages, inadequate food supplies, and never enough shelter to protect people from the elements.

According to Thomas Powers, the author of Diana: The Making of a Terrorist, the more Oughton learned about the hard life of rural Guatemala, the more she reflected on the affluence of the United States. In Chichicastenango, Americans seemed an alien presence; the fact of their wealth was almost an insult to the impoverished Indians. In her mind, confusion emerged that lasted the rest of her life: She had rejected affluence (at first almost unconsciously) to work among the poor, but poverty, clearly, was nothing to be envied. She hated poverty as well as affluence. Oughton left Chichicastenango with a new view of the problems that undeveloped countries like Guatemala faced when in struggle with the United States.

Those who knew Oughton recognized this period as the major turning point in her life; according to Powers, Oughton came to feel something close to a sense of shame at being American. In Fugitive Days, Bill Ayers writes that Oughton "had had an abundance of experience in Guatemala, a torrent, almost more than she could endure. She now sometimes suffered the full flood of her experiences." Oughton became much more aware of the United States' impact on foreign countries, and she did not return to Philadelphia as the same Midwest Republican. Oughton's friends from college noticed upon her return to the United States how she had matured, displaying sadness regarding the poverty she encountered in Guatemala in the previous two years.

== Children's Community School ==
In 1966, Oughton left Philadelphia for Ann Arbor, Michigan to enroll in the University of Michigan Graduate School of Education, seeking her Master of Arts degree in teaching. In Michigan, she began to work part-time at the Children's Community School (CCS), a project established by Toby Hendon and based on the Summerhill method of education. Children were allowed to do what they liked when they liked, on the premise that both teaching and learning were most successful when most spontaneous. The CCS mission was to treat the children with love and understanding, in hopes that violent thoughts would not consume the child's personality. The school also tried to establish complete equality between white and black students and to involve parents in the running of the school, so that it might be a community in the largest sense of the word.

Later in 1966, Oughton dropped almost all of her other commitments to work full-time at CCS. She designed a fund-raising button with a smiling face and the words "Children Are Only Newer People". At CCS, Oughton met teacher Bill Ayers. The two fell in love and soon began living together. In 1968, the school ran into severe problems, such as the fact that few students learned to read, and lost its funding, so Oughton and Ayers sought to become active elsewhere in the community.

== SDS and the Jesse James Gang ==
Ayers and Oughton were involved with Students for a Democratic Society while working at CCS, but it was not until after the closure of the school that they became involved as full-time organizers. Their lives became consumed by meetings, organizing, and planning actions.

It was during this time that Ayers and Oughton met Terry Robbins. In March 1968, Oughton helped create a women's liberation group. The group met every week or so, wherever the women could find room. Most of the talk seemed to center on the subordinate role of women in the radical movement and on the sexual oppression of women by the "macho" tendency of males to regard sex as conquest. During these meetings, Oughton often discussed the role that women played in the SDS, which was a combination of being a sexual object, an office clerk, and a housekeeper.

Later in 1968, Oughton told a friend that Ayers had slept with other women while she was away for five days. She told the friend she tried to convince herself that it didn't matter, but it did.

Also in 1968, Oughton and Ayers became part of the Jesse James Gang, which banded together with about 40 others against the moderates. The Jesse James Gang replaced the University of Michigan SDS chapter, and Robbins, Oughton, and Ayers worked in partnership with Jim Mellen from the Revolutionary Youth Movement Group. The Vietnam War entered its third year in the middle of 1968. The early student movement had taken their moral stance from the teachings of Albert Camus, who taught that thinking men have the responsibility to find a way in the world to be neither a victim or the executioner. Four events in 1968 turned the American student movement into self-proclaimed Marxist–Leninist revolutionaries: the Viet Cong's Tet Offensive, the student sit-in at Columbia University, the near-revolution in France, and the Democratic National Convention in Chicago. Each event helped change the way American radicals viewed their own situations.

By the end of 1968, the revolutionaries were tired of waiting for change and no longer had allegiance to or trust in America's democracy. One of the few actions by the Jesse James Gang occurred on the University of Michigan campus while Robben Fleming, the university president, was speaking to a group of students inside a school building. Oughton spoke outside with a portable address system while the Jesse James Gang handed out sliced pieces of bread, shouting "Here's the bread. Get the baloney inside."

The 1968 annual national SDS convention was held at Michigan State University. Oughton and Ayers were participants sponsored by Eric Chester, who was a Voice-SDS leader in Ann Arbor. The gang insisted that action was the only thing likely to create a situation in which radical solutions to American problems would be considered. The Gang offered a tight, validating community within which members could express their rage and frustration about the status quo and their empathy for suffering.

== Weatherman ==
With the split of SDS in 1969, Oughton and Ayers joined the Weatherman faction. Oughton found it difficult to get along with her father; she saw her parents' lives in Dwight, Illinois as complacent and secure, and lives in the impoverished sections of Chicago and Detroit as chaotic. At this time, SDS protests became more violent and radical. Oughton and Ayers had been drifting apart since December 1968. Monogamy, according to Ayers, interfered with his political work. Oughton replaced her friends, and she abandoned teaching for politics. Merrill Rosenberg told Oughton "Revolution means violence and risk, or it is only talk. The Weathermen's arguments pointed to their conclusion that the time was now to fight."

In August 1969, Oughton participated in an SDS delegation that traveled to Cuba for the third meeting between Vietnamese and American delegates. The Vietnamese called the meeting to discuss progress taken in the peace movement as the war in Vietnam was entering its final stages. Oughton was impressed by Cuba's progress in literacy and medical treatment. The pace of movement toward action within the Weathermen picked up soon after their return from Cuba.

Oughton and 75 other Weatherwomen drove to Pittsburgh on September 3, 1969 after attending a caucus in Cleveland to take part in what the Weathermen Group called a practice run of the Days of Rage. On the morning of September 4, 20 Weatherwomen entered the American Friends Service Committee (AFSC) office and held the office workers captive until the Weatherwomen had run off copies of a leaflet to be handed out to student sympathizers. One of the Weatherwomen told Miss Dodd, who worked in the AFSC office: "We thought until now you were on our side. Now we know you are a member of the enemy." A short time later, all 75 Weatherwomen appeared at South Hills High School in Pittsburgh to participate in a "jailbreak". The women spray painted anti-war slogans "Ho lives" and "Free Huey" on the school's main entrance doors, and handed out leaflets, urging high school students to "bring the war home," and asking students to leave the school campus. Some Weatherwomen made speeches in the school's playground about racism, imperialism, and the SDS national action plans. Oughton was able to escape from the Pittsburgh police, but 26 others, including Cathy Wilkerson, were arrested at the school. The students at the high school had no idea who the Weatherwomen were or why the women chose their school.

Part of this move toward greater violence was seen during the Days of Rage in Chicago, which took place October 8–11, 1969. One purpose of the Days of Rage was to create an image of strength and determination that would win converts to revolutionary violence. Weathermen gathered at Grant Park around a fire made from nearby park benches. They listened to leaders' speeches about Che Guevara and the world revolution. The last speech spurred the group to head for the Drake Hotel, where federal judge Julius Hoffman resided. He was the presiding judge at the Chicago 8 trial. Weathermen took their helmets, clubs, and chains, entered the streets, and smashed car windshields and store windows. Oughton was one of those arrested on October 9 in Chicago when police spied her keeping an eye out for other Weathermen who might turn up. Her bail was set at $5,000, which her father came up from Dwight to pay. Until Oughton's arrest, her family did not know who the Weathermen were. After she was released, Mr. Oughton dropped his daughter off at a church where she was meeting with other Weathermen; shortly afterward, police raided the church and arrested 43 members of the group. Oughton managed to escape by jumping from a ground floor window.

After the Days of Rage, the group became increasingly violent. Oughton returned home for a short visit around Christmas Day 1969. She seemed pleased to receive some clothing items and other gifts from her family. Although she appeared thin and fatigued, her family did not press her to stay. Oughton left her parents' home for the last time to go to Flint, Michigan for the December 27 "War Council" meeting. Oughton made the decision at the meeting to go underground. In her book Flying Close to the Sun, former Weatherman member Cathy Wilkerson describes meeting with Terry Robbins, also a member of the Jesse James Gang, who told her about a small, semi-clandestine group in New York to which he belonged. He explained briefly that the group had already been active: a firebomb had been thrown at the home of Judge Murtagh, then presiding over the trial of the Panther 21. When Wilkerson joined the collective, the members were in need of a place to stay. Wilkerson's father had a townhouse in New York and was to be away for a couple of weeks. Robbins wondered whether Wilkerson could get the keys. She did so, and the group arrived at 18 West 11th Street to decide their next move.

Jonah Raskin, whose wife Eleanor Raskin was part of the Weather Underground organization, and who was a courier for the Underground, recalls the last time he spoke with the members of the collective in New York: "I had talked to them not long before the townhouse blew up and they seemed to have lost touch with reality- and were incapable of making sensible decisions about almost everything."

== Townhouse explosion ==
On March 2, 1970, in Keene, New Hampshire, a Weatherman purchased two 50-pound cases of dynamite from the New England Explosives Corporation. Sometime that week, the dynamite was moved from Keene to Greenwich Village, where it was taken to the house at 18 West Eleventh Street. Oughton left Detroit and joined the group at the house. Oughton and Robbins were in the basement assembling a nail bomb when it detonated. Cathy Wilkerson, who was in the townhouse at the time, describes her experience during the explosion, "the idea that Terry and Diana were both in the subbasement overwhelmed everything else. As I forced my attention there and to them, my lungs expanded instantaneously to draw in air and dust so I could call out."

Wilkerson and Kathy Boudin, another Weatherman in the townhouse at the time, were the only two to escape. When they ran out into the street, someone asked if there was anyone else in the house. Thinking that Ted Gold, the other Weatherman in the townhouse, had gone to the store, Wilkerson replied that there was no one left inside, as she was sure that Robbins and Oughton were dead.

Four days after the explosion, detectives found some of Oughton's remains near a workbench in the rubble-filled basement of the devastated townhouse. At the end of another week, a detective discovered the tip of the little finger from the right hand. A print taken by a police department expert was matched later that day with a set of Oughton's prints in the Washington files of the FBI. The prints they had on file were from Oughton's arrest in Chicago on October 9, 1969 during the Days of Rage.

It took four days to find Oughton's remains, not only because of the amount of destruction the bomb had caused—the townhouse was destroyed—but also because of the dynamite found in the wreckage. While searching through the rubble, detectives found four lead pipes, each 12 inches (30 cm) in diameter and packed with dynamite. The street was cleared, the bomb-removal truck was summoned, and the search continued with considerable caution. Before the day was over, detectives found four cartons containing 57 sticks of dynamite, 30 blasting caps, and some cheap alarm clocks with holes drilled in their faces for wires. It was understood later that the bombs were to be detonated at a non-commissioned officers' dance at Fort Dix.

The doctor who examined Oughton's remains said that she had been standing within a foot or two of the bomb when it exploded. It may, in fact, have gone off in her hands. Ayers has raised the possibility that Oughton may have intentionally detonated the explosion, and it has been reported that a vicious argument occurred throughout the previous day and night in which Boudin favored using antipersonnel bombs and that Oughton had misgivings.

When Brian Flanagan reflects on his time as part of the Weather Underground Organization, he said "I was regretful over about 5 percent of what we did...I think 95 percent of what we did was great, and we'd do it again. And what was the 5 percent? The town house." When pressed, Flanagan said that he regretted "the deaths of the three Weathermen Ted Gold, Diana Oughton and Terry Robbins and the plan to bomb the dance at Fort Dix and the library at Columbia University, which could have taken lives."

The Townhouse Explosion was the dramatic culmination of the grim political direction in which Weatherman had been headed. Laura Whitehorn, a former member of Weatherman, said "We were out of touch with what was going on, and we lost sight of the fact that if you're a revolutionary, the first thing you have to try to do is preserve human life."

The Weather Underground Organization dedicated its book Prairie Fire to Oughton (as well as Sirhan Sirhan and many others).

Diana Oughton's mother was notified at the Oughton home by a member of the Dwight, Illinois police force, once Oughton's identity had been confirmed. Mr. Oughton was on a business trip in London at the time of Diana's death. He stated in the Detroit Free Press that he was told on the phone that "his daughter's remains had been identified in a bombed Greenwich Village townhouse. She was a revolutionary terrorist and the bomb, intended for an adjunct of the Establishment in New York, had killed her by mistake." Mr. Oughton also stated in the article: "I knew she had friends in radical politics and that she was traveling around the country organizing teach-ins. But even as late as the (1968) Democratic convention she refused to take part in the violence. I'm sure she did this with a crystal clear conscience. There was nothing egocentric or self-centered about it." On Tuesday, March 24, 1970, Oughton was buried next to her grandparents in the family plot about a mile and a half outside of Dwight. Hundreds attended the funeral services. Some of the children Oughton had worked with at the Children's Community School pinned their fund-raising buttons, that Oughton had designed and made three years beforehand, to a bouquet of flowers at the explosion site.

== Cultural references ==
=== In film and television ===
Katherine (1975), loosely based on Oughton's life, is a TV movie starring Sissy Spacek, tells the story of Katherine Alman, who was from a wealthy Denver family, became socially active, served as a teacher of English in South America, then joined a radical "collective" which had many similarities to the SDS and eventually the Weather Underground. The "collective" protested the Vietnam War, invaded a high school, held a "war council" and eventually split into peaceful and violent factions. The story ended with Katherine's death from the explosion of the bomb that detonated prematurely at a government building the violent faction had targeted.

=== In music ===
The song "Diana - Part 1", sung by Paul Kantner on the album Sunfighter (1971), was written in response to the story of Diana Oughton and the Weathermen.

=== In print ===
James Merrill, who had grown up in the townhouse that was owned by Cathy Wilkerson's father at the time of the bombing, wrote a poem titled "18 West 11th Street".

Richard M. Pearlstein wrote The Mind of the Political Terrorist (1991), in which he attempted to provide insight into the individual psychological dimensions of political terrorism. Diana Oughton is one of the individuals he uses as a case study.

== See also ==
- John R. Oughton House
