= Terry Robbins =

American activist (1947-1970)

- Born: October 4, 1947; Queens County, New York, USA
- Died: March 6, 1970 (aged 22); New York, New York, USA
- Known for: Weather Underground

Terry Robbins (October 4, 1947 – March 6, 1970) was an American far left activist, a key member of the Ohio Students for a Democratic Society (The S.D.S.), and one of the three Weathermen who died in the Greenwich Village townhouse explosion.

== Early life ==
Terry Robbins was raised in Queens, New York in a Jewish family by his mother Olga, a Hunter College alumna, and father Sam, who worked at a garment factory. When Robbins was six years old, his mother began to suffer from breast cancer, which eventually caused her death three years later. As Olga's health deteriorated, Robbins's father hired a domestic worker, nicknamed "Auntie Annie" by Robbins and his sister. "Auntie Annie" remained in the Robbins employ for two years until Olga died.

Two years after his mother's death, Robbins's father remarried. Robbins became withdrawn and buried himself in schoolwork. He also began to turn to poetry and music as a refuge, and with his sister and cousins discovered the musical world of the Beatles, Bob Dylan, and Barbra Streisand. After graduating from Lawrence High School, Robbins attended Kenyon College in Ohio in the fall of 1964 and majored in English. In his first year of college, Robbins heard about Dickie Magidoff, a member of a far left political group called Students for a Democratic Society, who was working in the Cleveland area.

In the summer of 1965, he joined Magidoff and became involved in what they called the "Cleveland Economic Research and Action Project (Cleveland ERAP)" which exposed him to more SDS members. He moved into the Cleveland ERAP house and began helping raise capital to support their efforts. In the fall of 1965, the beginning of his sophomore year, Robbins was eager to start up his own SDS chapter at the Kenyon College campus; he was the only official SDS member during his time there.

In the following 1966 spring semester, he was able to team up with the chaplain of the school and organize a Student-Faculty Committee on the Vietnam War. In an informal letter to Magidoff, Robbins spoke of his successful strategy at the Kenyon College campus and how he was able to get the support of "five faculty members and at least eighteen students to gather together and attempt to make a case for a critical approach to American foreign policy."

== After Kenyon College (1966–1967) ==
After his sophomore year in 1966, Robbins decided to drop out of Kenyon College due to his unpopularity and inability to recruit students for his SDS chapter. He began his summer working with the Cleveland Project, which was concentrating their efforts on creating an alternative school for children to attend in order to escape the perceived racial inequalities of the public school system.

It was then that Robbins met Bill Ayers and Diana Oughton, other SDS members that were a part of the Children's Community in Ann Arbor, Michigan. Ayers and Robbins's interest in writing became a bond between them; they collaborated for the first time, authoring a lengthy paper called Turn Toward Children, which discussed the educational and political philosophies of the Children's Community of both Ann Arbor and Cleveland.

At the end of that summer Robbins left Cleveland and joined Ayers and Oughton in Ann Arbor to spend some time trying to use the long history of SDS to encourage more student activity at the University of Michigan. Robbins felt he had more in common with the members of the Michigan SDS. They were a much younger chapter than in Cleveland and they all shared a great passion for music and sarcasm.

== Jesse James Gang (1968) ==
Working in partnership with Jim Mellen from the Revolutionary Youth Movement, Ayers, Oughton, and Robbins began a new faction of the Ann Arbor SDS set out to transform SDS's identity in their area. They were excited by the idea of militancy and in the words of writer Jeremy Varon, they used "confrontational action, in your face politics and their boisterous, even anarchic, spirit to help build large SDS chapters at colleges and universities everywhere."

Robbins and the other founding members recognized that the politics of the old SDS did not command any appeal to their younger student members. The gang felt that the younger students were now being attracted by culture and not by politics. They were in search for validation in their anger over the war. As a main member of the gang, Robbins and the others embarked on a project that included: classroom disruptions, burning exams, public critiques of courses/and professors, and the disruption of the upcoming presidential elections.

== Case Western Reserve University and Kent State (1968) ==
As student activism and community organizing became two of his passions, Robbins traveled to other surrounding campuses to help other students establish their own SDS chapters. While traveling back to the Cleveland area, Ohio SDS Regional staff member Lisa Meisel and several other students passed out leaflets that drew about a hundred people to Case Western Reserve University to hear Robbins and Ayers talk about the possibility of a revolution. They addressed the issues of the draft, university complicity, women's liberation, and the protest of the upcoming presidential election. The following day, Robbins and Ayers led sixty students in a "shout-down" demonstration disrupting presidential candidate Hubert Humphrey's speech.

During a 1968 spring semester visit to Kent State, one of Ohio's most radical chapters, Robbins was able to convince a small group of activists in using a more forceful approach in their demonstration methods. In a statement from Robbins and Meisel titled The War At Kent State, both claimed that a war was on at Kent State and demanded the university "abolish ROTC because it protected imperialism by suppressing popular movements at home and abroad, end the Project Themis Grant and the universities involvement in developing sophisticated weaponry used against people's struggles for freedom, abolish the Law Enforcement School and abolish the Northeast Ohio Crime Lab because both institutions defended the American status quo and protected the interests of the ruling class."

The first of such action against the university began on April 8, 1969. The SDS held a rally that attracted about 400 people in support of their demands and led 200 of them to march on to the administration buildings and use force to get past the police that were blocking their way. The university responded by suspending seven Kent State students and ended up pressing charges against five other people. Several other rallies were conducted over the next few days while the university continued to ignore the SDS's demands.

Robbins and the remainder of the SDS members reaffirmed their demands and added a fifth demand that called for open and collective hearings of the suspended students. On April 16, 1969, fellow SDS member Colin Nieberger's university trial was to be held on campus. 2,000 supporters came to support the rally and approximately 700 of them marched to the Music and Speech building where Nieberger's trial was being conducted. The passage from author Dan Berger's book Outlaws of America describes how Robbins and a few other SDS members "moved past an army of athletes and policemen to successfully disrupt a university hearing on disciplinary and student-power issues." After an hour of struggle the trials were canceled and Robbins was ultimately given credit for being the leader of the first student rebellions at Kent State.

Robbins was arrested for his involvement during the demonstrations and was sentenced to serve a three-month prison term for his actions. In December 1969, Robbins served six weeks of his three-month jail sentence in a Cleveland area prison.

== Weathermen (1969) ==
In a special edition of the New Left Notes for the upcoming 1969 SDS National Convention, Robbins and ten other SDS members had created a manifesto for students to become revolutionaries. Taking inspiration from Bob Dylan's track Subterranean Homesick Blues, Robbins had played with the meanings of the line "you don't need a weatherman to know which way the wind blows" which later became the title for the Weathermen's founding statement for their organization and developed the Weathermen Organization's identity.

In response to the resignation of Mike Klonsky (National Secretary for SDS in 1968–1969 and RYM leader) and his opposition to the Weather's theoretical paper and their dismissal of the white working class as "hopelessly reactionary," both Robbins and Mark Rudd challenged Klonsky's approach by insisting that the first and most urgent obligation of whites was to fight in support of the peoples of the world who were "rising up against them" and that they needed to create movements that fight, not just talk about fighting. "The aggressiveness, seriousness, and toughness of militant struggle will attract vast numbers of working class youth."

Being one of the people in charge of the organizing and planning the national action for the organization, Robbins was based in Chicago, Illinois. During one of his visits to the local collectives and attending one of their meetings he had responded to a comment of a female SDS member in a very offensive tone. Some female members, including Chicago SDS/Weathermen Cathy Wilkerson, challenged him and accused Robbins of being sexist and disrespectful of a woman's opinion. After a scuffle had broken out, Robbins and the women sat down to try and resolve their issues. In the end Robbins and the women agreed to disagree. A kinship between Wilkerson and Robbins began to develop, which eventually led to an intimate relationship.

== "Days of Rage" (1969) ==
In the publicity of the upcoming "Call for National Action" Robbins and Ayers decided to bomb one of Chicago's historical monuments located at Haymarket Square, the exact place where they were to gather the next day.

On October 6, two days before the Days of Rage demonstration, Robbins and Ayers set off a dynamite bomb that toppled the bronze policeman statue. The mayor called the act as an "attack on all the citizens of Chicago, called for law and order, and appealed to the youth." This message offered a portent to the gathering members of SDS. During the chaos of the Chicago demonstrations Robbins got hold of a tear gas tank and threw it back at one of the police officers.

== New York collective (1969–1970) ==
After the Chicago demonstration a few members of the Weathermen began developing a secret New York collective. Robbins joined with John Jacobs, a Columbia graduate and former Progressive Labor Party member; Ted Gold, a Columbia SDS chapter leader; Kathy Boudin, a fellow member of the Cleveland ERAP; Cathy Wilkerson; and Diana Oughton. After securing a New York City safe house, the collective was able to conspire on their next plan of actions. After the fire bombs set to ignite at Judge Murtagh's house, the judge who oversaw the Panther 21 indictment, failed, Robbins presented the group with the idea of using dynamite, a more predictable form of ammunition.

Robbins was an English major and poet and not very proficient in the makings of electricity and dynamite. He believed it was his job to learn how it worked and was able to obtain a basic circuit design to detonate the dynamite on a timer. According to the accounts in Wilkerson's memoir, after Robbins had explained the step-by-step procedure he studied, which gave exact details on how to connect the electrical timing device, another member raised the issue of a safety switch. Being a novice bomb maker, Robbins decided to take the responsibility of building the circuits on his own. Robbins had decided that the basement was the safest place to make the bombs and moved all equipment there.

== The explosion ==
The morning of March 6, 1970, while finishing up preparations to bomb the Non-Commissioned Officers Dance at Fort Dix, Robbins and two other New York Collective members (Diana Oughton and Ted Gold) were blown up by a premature explosion in their Greenwich Village townhouse. The explosion occurred in the basement floor of the townhouse at 18 West 11th in which Robbins and Oughton had been working.

Other members deduced that Robbins's inexperience in the art of bomb making led him to mistakenly cross wires and set off a premature detonation. The remains of the bodies found in the basement were almost unidentifiable; the police were able to identify the remains of Diana Oughton by a fragment of her thumb. Ted Gold's body was found outside, crushed under the townhouse's framework. It was only with the issuance of the first official Weather Underground Organization (WUO) communiqué, weeks after the explosion, that Robbins was identified as the last victim.

Shortly after the explosion, Weathermen leaders placed John Jacobs on indefinite leave from the WUO because he was the main advocate of Robbins's aggressive actions. Robbins was convinced that extreme acts of destruction were the way for the organization to move into a revolution. He was seen as the main source of the Weathermen's aggressive tendencies; as friend Bill Ayers once said, "his extremism was an impulse in all of us."

Due to the explosion, the Weathermen claimed to try not to hurt people:

We were very careful from the moment of the townhouse on to be sure we weren't going to hurt anybody, and we never did hurt anybody. Whenever we put a bomb in a public space, we had figured out all kinds of ways to put checks and balances on the thing and also to get people away from it, and we were remarkably successful.

— Bill Ayers
