= Days of Rage =

1969 riots in Chicago, Illinois

- Part of the opposition to U.S. involvement in Vietnam and political violence in the United States during the Cold War
- Date: October 8–11, 1969
- Location: Chicago, Illinois
- Goals: Create mass action to end American involvement in the Vietnam War
- Result: City damages and arrests of Weathermen

Parties
Students for a Democratic Society; Revolutionary Youth Movement; Weather Underground	State of Illinois Law enforcement; Chicago Police Department; Illinois National Guard

Lead figures
Bernardine Dohrn; David Gilbert; Jeff Jones; Tom Hayden	

Number
800	2,000

Casualties
- Injuries: 34+
- Arrested: 250+

Poster advertising the event

The Days of Rage were a series of riots during three days in October 1969 in Chicago, organized by the emerging Weatherman faction of Students for a Democratic Society (SDS).

The group planned the October 8–11 event as a "National Action" built around John Jacobs' slogan "bring the war home", which grew out of a resolution drafted by Jacobs and introduced at the October 1968 SDS National Council meeting in Boulder, Colorado. The resolution read, "The Elections Don't Mean Shit—Vote Where the Power Is—Our Power Is In The Street". It was adopted by the council, prompted by the effects of the 1968 Democratic National Convention protest activity in August and reflecting Jacobs's advocacy of direct action as political strategy.

== Sociopolitical background ==
In 1969, tensions ran high among the factions of SDS. The Weathermen were still part of the organization but differences were coming to the surface. "Look at it: America 1969" put forth SDS's bottom line regarding the National Action. By the end of August, the differences between the Weathermen and Revolutionary Youth Movement II (RYM II) had emerged, leading to the resignation of RYM II leader and member of SDS Mike Klonsky from the Weatherman-controlled national office leadership. He accused the Weathermen of going back on the convention's mandate. Weathermen members Mark Rudd and Terry Robbins responded, saying that priority must be given to building an anti-imperialist youth movement.

In the months before the Days of Rage, despite the tensions within SDS, many members of Weather/SDS worked non-stop in promoting the demonstration. Lyndon Comstock was sent, along with three other members, to Lansing, Michigan, to organize and promote the event. Leaflets were printed and distributed to high school and community college students during the day, while at night members would spray paint anti-war graffiti on local school campuses.

On October 6, 1969, the statue commemorating the policemen killed in the 1886 Haymarket affair in Chicago was blown up by a group including William Ayers. The blast broke nearly 100 windows and scattered pieces of the statue onto the Kennedy Expressway below; no one was ever arrested for the bombing. Weatherman found itself isolated from SDS, but maintained hopes that thousands would attend the mass demonstration in Chicago.

== Events of the Days of Rage ==
=== October 8 ===
Despite efforts to recruit youth and promote involvement, participation in the "Days of Rage" demonstrations was not as broadly based as advertised, or as participants had hoped. About 800 Weatherman members showed up prior to October 8 and faced 2,000 police officers. No more than 300 were left willing to face the enormous gathering of police a second time around on the evening of Wednesday, October 8, 1969, in Chicago's Lincoln Park, and perhaps half of them were members of Weatherman collectives from around the country. The crowd milled about for several hours, cold and uncertain. Tom Hayden gave a short speech, telling the protesters not to believe press reports that the Chicago 7 disagreed with their action. Abbie Hoffman and John Froines, other members of the Chicago 7, also came but decided not to speak and quickly left. Late in the evening, Jacobs stood on the pedestal of the bombed Haymarket policemen's statue and declared: "We'll probably lose people today ... We don't really have to win here ... just the fact that we are willing to fight the police is a political victory." Jacobs' speech compared the coming protest to the fight against fascism in World War II. By this time there were around 350 protesters.

Finally, at 10:25 p.m., Jeff Jones gave the pre-arranged signal over a bullhorn, and the Weatherman action began. John Jacobs, Jeff Jones, David Gilbert and others led a charge south through the city toward the Drake Hotel and the exceptionally affluent Gold Coast neighborhood, smashing windows in automobiles and buildings as they went. The rioters attacked "ordinary cars, a barber shop ... and the windows of lower-middle-class homes" as well as police cars and luxury businesses. The mass of the crowd ran about four blocks before encountering police barricades. The rioters charged the police, breaking into small groups, and more than 1,000 police counterattacked. The Washington DC contingent reached the hotel's front drive. Before any attempt to gain entrance to the hotel could be made, an unmarked car pulled up to the curb and began firing revolvers into the group of about fifteen unarmed rioters. Although many rioters had motorcycle or football helmets on, the police were better trained and armed; nightsticks were aimed at necks, legs and groins. Large amounts of tear gas were used, and at least twice police ran squad cars full speed into crowds. After only a half-hour or so, the riot was over: 28 policemen were injured (none seriously), six Weathermen were shot (none fatally) an unknown number injured in other ways, and 68 rioters were arrested. Jacobs was arrested almost immediately.

=== October 9 ===
The next day a "Women's Militia" of around seventy female Weatherman members met at Grant Park, where Bernardine Dohrn addressed them. The plan was to raid a draft board office, but they were overpowered by police when they tried to leave the park. Later that day, Illinois Governor Richard Ogilvie announced that he had called in over 2,500 National Guardsmen to "protect Chicago". The Weathermen cancelled protests that had been planned for that evening.

=== October 10 ===
The largest event of the Days of Rage occurred on October 10, when RYM II led an interracial march of 2,000 people through a Spanish-speaking part of Chicago.

=== October 11 ===
On October 11, the Weathermen attempted to regroup and reignite the direct action. About 300 protesters marched swiftly through The Loop, Chicago's main business district, watched over by a double-line of heavily armed police. Led by Jacobs and other Weathermen members, the protesters suddenly broke through the police lines and rampaged through the Loop, smashing windows of cars and stores. However, the police were ready, and quickly sealed off the rioters. Within 15 minutes, more than half the crowd had been arrested—one of the first, again, being Jacobs.

Richard Elrod, a city attorney, was paralyzed after an altercation with Weatherman member Brian Flanagan. Elrod accused Flanagan of attacking him, while Flanagan maintained that Elrod simply hit a concrete wall. Flanagan was charged with attempted murder and other crimes but was acquitted on all counts. The Weathermen later produced a song mocking Elrod, a parody of Bob Dylan's "Lay Lady Lay", including the lines "Lay, Elrod, lay / Lay in the street for a while / Stay, Elrod, stay / Stay in your bed for a while."

== Aftermath ==
The Days of Rage cost Chicago and the state of Illinois about $183,000 ($100,000 for National Guard payroll, $35,000 in damages, and $20,000 for one injured citizen's medical expenses). Of Weather, 287 members were arrested during the Days of Rage and most of the Weathermen and SDS' leaders were jailed. The organization paid out more than $243,000 to cover bail. Chicago Black Panthers leader Fred Hampton dismissed the Days of Rage as "anarchistic, opportunistic, individualistic, chauvinistic, custeristic".

Jones and other Weathermen failed to appear for their March 1970 court date to face charges of "crossing state lines to foment a riot and conspiring to do so". "Unlawful flight to avoid prosecution" charges were added when they failed to appear in court.

== General and cited references ==
- Alexander, Robert J. Maoism in the Developed World. New York: Praeger Publishers, 2001. ISBN 0-275-96148-6.
- Allyn, David. Make Love, Not War: The Sexual Revolution: An Unfettered History. New York: Little, Brown and Company, 2000. ISBN 0-316-03930-6.
- Avorn, J.L. Up Against the Ivy Wall. New York: Scribner, 1968. ISBN 0-689-70236-1.
- Austin, Curtis J. Up Against the Wall: Violence in the Making and Unmaking of the Black Panther Party. Little Rock: University of Arkansas Press, 2006. ISBN 1-55728-827-5.
- Avrich, Paul. The Haymarket Tragedy. Princeton, N.J.: Princeton University Press, 1984. ISBN 0-691-00600-8.
- Ayers, William. Fugitive Days: A Memoir. Boston: Beacon Press, 2001. ISBN 0-8070-7124-2.
- Barber, David. "Leading the Vanguard: White New Leftists School the Panthers on Black Revolution". In In Search of the Black Panther Party: New Perspectives on a Revolutionary Movement. New ed. Jama Lazerow and Yohuru Williams, eds. Raleigh, N.C.: Duke University Press, 2006. ISBN 0-8223-3890-4.
- Berger, Dan. Outlaws of America: The Weather Underground and the Politics of Solidarity. Paperback ed. Oakland, Calif.: AK Press, 2006. ISBN 1-904859-41-0.
- Burns, Vincent and Peterson, Kate Dempsey. Terrorism: A Documentary and Reference Guide. Westport, Conn.: Greenwood Press, 2005. ISBN 0-313-33213-4.
- Cannato, Vincent. The Ungovernable City: John Lindsay and His Struggle to Save New York. New York: Basic Books, 2001. ISBN 0-465-00843-7.
- Dohrn, Bernardine; Ayers, Bill; and Jones, Jeff, eds. Sing a Battle Song: The Revolutionary Poetry, Statements, and Communiqués of the Weather Underground, 1970–1974. New York: Seven Stories Press, 2006. ISBN 1-58322-726-1.
- Elbaum, Max. Revolution in the Air: Sixties Radicals Turn to Lenin, Mao and Che. New York: Verso, 2002. ISBN 1-85984-617-3.
- Jacobs, Harold, ed. "Weatherman". Berkeley, California: Ramparts Press, 1970.
- Jacobs, Ron. The Way the Wind Blew: A History of the Weather Underground. Paperback ed. New York: Verso, 1997. ISBN 1-85984-167-8.
- Joseph, Peniel E. Waiting 'Til the Midnight Hour: A Narrative History of Black Power in America. New York: Henry Holt and Company, 2006. ISBN 0-8050-7539-9.
- Kahn, Roger. The Battle for Morningside Heights: Why Students Rebel. New York: William Morrow and Company, Inc., 1970. ISBN 0-688-29254-2.
- Kempton, Murray. The Briar Patch: The Trial of the Panther 21. Paperback reprint ed. New York: Da Capo Press, 1997. ISBN 0-306-80799-8.
- Kirkpatrick, Rob (2009). 1969: The Year Everything Changed. New York: Skyhorse Publishing. ISBN 978-1-60239-366-0.
- Matusow, Allen J. The Unraveling of America: A History of Liberalism in the 1960s. New York: Harper & Row, 1984. ISBN 0-06-015224-9.
- McCaughey, Robert. Stand, Columbia: A History of Columbia University. New York: Columbia University Press, 2003. ISBN 0-231-13008-2.
- Mestrovic, Matthew M. "For Eastern Europe: PR or Policy?" Commonweal. October 1969.
- Rudd, Mark. "Columbia". Movement. March 1969.
- Rudd, Mark. "Organizing vs. Activism in 1968". Speech given at Drew University, November 4, 2006. Transcribed by Brian Kelly, January 9, 2008.
- Sale, Kirkpatrick. SDS. New York: Random House, 1973. ISBN 0-394-47889-4.
- Sprinzak, Ehud. "The Student Movement: Marxism as Symbolic Action". In Varieties of Marxism. Shlomo Avineri, ed. New York: Springer, 1977. ISBN 90-247-2024-9.
- Varon, Jeremy. Bringing the War Home: The Weather Underground, the Red Army Faction, and Revolutionary Violence in the Sixties and Seventies. Paperback ed. Berkeley, Calif.: University of California Press, 2004. ISBN 0-520-24119-3.
- Varon, Jeremy. "Between Revolution 9 and Thesis 11: Or, Will We Learn (Again) to Start Worrying and Change the World?" In The New Left Revisited: Critical Perspectives on the Past. John McMillian and Paul Buhle, eds. Philadelphia: Temple University Press, 2002. ISBN 1-56639-976-9.
- Wilkerson, Cathy. Flying Close to the Sun: My Life and Times As a Weatherman. New York: Seven Stories Press, 2007. ISBN 1-58322-771-7.

=== Secondary sources ===
- Churchill, Ward and Vander Wall, Jim. The COINTELPRO Papers: Documents from the FBI's Secret Wars Against Dissent in the United States. 2d ed. Boston: South End Press, 2002. ISBN 0-89608-648-8.
- Collier, Peter, and Horowitz, David. "Doing It: The Inside Story of the Rise and Fall of the Weather Underground". Rolling Stone. September 30, 1982.
- "FBI Drops 10-Year Hunt for 'Weather' Group Leaders". Los Angeles Times. October 20, 1979.
- Gillies, Kevin. "The Last Radical". Vancouver Magazine. November 1998.
- Good, Thomas. "Brian Flanagan Speaks". Next Left Notes. 2005.
- "Haymarket Statue Bombed". Chicago Tribune. October 7, 1969.
- Jones, Thai (2004). A Radical Line: From the Labor Movement to the Weather Underground, One Family's Century of Conscience. New York: Free Press. ISBN 0-7432-5027-3.
- Kifner, John. "12 S.D.S. Militants Indicted in Chicago". New York Times. April 3, 1970.
- Klonsky, Mike. "Toward A Revolutionary Youth Movement". New Left Notes. December 23, 1968.
- MacLennan, Catherine. "How Can You Do Nothing? The Weather Underground Bring the War Home". The Lamp. April 2004. Archived December 15, 2007, at the Wayback Machine
- Patterson, John. "They Emerged From 1960s Radical Chic to Become America's Most Wanted Fugitives". The Guardian. July 4, 2003.
- "Statue Honoring Police Is Blown Up in Chicago". New York Times. October 8, 1969.
- Shepard, Benjamin. "Antiwar Movements, Then and Now". Monthly Review. February 2002.
- Short, John G. "The Weathermen're Shot, They're Bleeding, They're Running, They're Wiping Stuff Out". Harvard Crimson. June 11, 1970.
- Smith, Bryan. "Sudden Impact". Chicago Magazine. December 2006.
- "You Don't Need A Weatherman to Know Which Way the Wind Blows". New Left Notes. June 18, 1969.
