= Roger Lippman =

American anti-war activist

Roger Henry Lippman (born 1947) is an American political activist. He was a member of the anti-Vietnam War groups Students for a Democratic Society (SDS) and the Seattle collective of Weatherman. He is most commonly noted as a member of the Seattle Seven, who was accused of, and tried for, conspiracy charges in 1970.

== Private life ==
Roger Lippman was born in Seattle in 1947. He went to school at Reed College in Oregon. He is one of four brothers, one of whom, David Lippman, was also active in SDS, and another, Peter Lippman, who is also a human rights activist, is a writer, journalist, and contributor for Roger's Balkan Witness website.

== Involvement with Students for a Democratic Society ==
While at Reed College, Lippman became the editor of an underground radical publication called, The Agitator, and became involved in radical politics as a member of SDS. In April 1968, he organized and attended the Northwest Draft Resistance Conference, where he represented the Reed College chapter of SDS. There, he published an article entitled, "Talking to McCarthyites about McCarthy." During this time, New Left Notes, the national publication of the SDS, named Lippman as the key contact for the SDS summer project in Seattle. According to released government documents, this project, "called for infiltration of industries and business there 'for sabotage and recruitment.'" That year, Lippman left his studies to devote himself to organizing for the peace movement.

== Involvement with Weatherman and the Seattle Seven ==
In June 1969, Lippman attended the SDS national convention at the Chicago Coliseum, which saw the disintegration of SDS into various factions. During the SDS "Days of Rage" that October, he was arrested and charged with disorderly conduct and mob actions. While the first charge was vacated, Lippman was convicted of mob action and sentenced to eleven days in jail and a fine of $90.

On April 16, 1970, Lippman, along with members of the Seattle Liberation Front, was indicted on conspiracy charges. Lippman had been arrested in California in conjunction with an anti-war demonstration, along with his brother, David, on April 15. His co-defendants in the Seattle case were Chip Marshall, Jeff Dowd, Susan Stern, Michael Lerner, Joe Kelly, Michael Abeles, and Michael Justesen. The latter disappeared before he could be arrested. The charges stemmed from a February 1970 demonstration in Seattle, considered to be the biggest and most violent anti-war demonstration in the city at the time. It was part of a nationwide movement called "The Day After," meant to express solidarity and outrage at the jailing of the Chicago Seven, who organized protests of the 1968 Democratic National Convention. Lippman, while indicted in Seattle with his other alleged co-conspirators, had moved to San Francisco the month before to edit a radical newspaper there. In the complaint, other co-defendants were alleged to have "spok[en] to assemblages of persons in Seattle," and "led a march to the United States Courthouse," attempting to establish a timeline of events that culminated with property damage at the United States Courthouse and the Federal office Building. Lippman was only mentioned in the complaint as having "met" with the others on two occasions.

The trial was highlighted by the antics of the defendants and their antagonistic relationship with presiding judge George Hugo Boldt. Chip Marshall acted as his own counsel, and there were multiple disruptions of the proceedings by supporters of the Seven. At one point, Jeff Dowd spread a Nazi flag in the courtroom, implying Boldt was a fascist. Violence erupted twice during the trial, resulting in injuries and contempt of court charges. Speaking about the violence in the courtroom, Lippman has written, "More of them ended up with bloody noses, but it was us who ended up in jail." Boldt declared a mistrial on December 10, but upheld the contempt charges against the defendants.

The story of the case was retold in Kit Bakke's 2018 book, "Protest On Trial."

== Life after the Seattle Seven Trial ==
In 1974, Lippman sued officials in the government and Richard Nixon's administration for alleged illegal wiretapping and surveillance activities. Among those named in the complaint were former Attorneys General John Mitchell, William Saxbe and Richard Kleindienst, former director of the Federal Bureau of Investigation Clarence Kelley, and subsidiary divisions of the Bell Telephone Company. In his suit, Lippman alleged that agents of the government, police, and FBI were responsible for illegal wiretapping activities both at the SDS national office and locally in Seattle, including activities at his home. He also alleged acts of burglary and illegal prosecution as well as the infringement of his Civil Rights. Released documents reveal that the government was at least aware of Lippman's residence as early as 1969, and referred to it as a "commune for SDS members." In the same document, Lippman was referred to as the "leader of [the] Weatherman chapter in Seattle." Despite the revelation of many of the activities he alleged, as well as similar crimes during the Watergate investigation, Lippman was forced to drop his suit due to lack of resources.

Lippman maintains a website that contains articles he has written in his years of activism. He is editor of Balkan Witness, a compilation of reporting and opinions on the conflicts in Kosovo and Bosnia. In 2022 he added a compendium of sources on the war in Ukraine.

Lippman is an active opponent of nuclear power and has written extensively on the issue.
