= Michael Justesen =

American activist (born 1950)

Michael Thomas Justesen
- Born: May 17, 1950 (age 75)
- Known for: Former member of the SLF, SDS, and Weather Underground Organization

Michael Justesen (born May 17, 1950) is a former member of Students for a Democratic Society (SDS), the Seattle Liberation Front (SLF) and Weather Underground Organization (WUO).

== Early education and activism ==
Two different sources give conflicting places of birth for Michael Justesen. According to the FBI Surveillance Files, Justesen was born in Sacramento, California. However, Michael Justesen was born in Seattle, Washington, according to Susan Stern, the author of With the Weathermen: The Personal Journal of a Revolutionary Woman. Justesen attended the University of Washington as a freshman in 1968. Justesen's first involvement with politics was participating in the University of Washington draft resistance in 1968, and he consequently withdrew from the university to devote all his time to the revolution. He became active in SDS soon after.

== SDS ==
Justesen was a part of the SDS leadership in the Seattle collective. From August to mid September 1969, Justesen traveled to Japan to attend the Second International Anti-Imperialist Conference to make contact with "Red Army" student activists. The focus of the conference was opposition to the United States in Vietnam and Korea and support for the Vietnamese people. On October 8–11, 1969, Justesen volunteered to co-ordinate and send bail for SDS members from Seattle who were in Chicago, Illinois for the protest demonstrations for "Days of Rage." Justesen attended the "War Council" meetings in Flint, Michigan on December 27–31, 1969.

== Seattle Weatherman ==
Michael Justesen played a leading role in the Seattle Weatherman collective. On December 1, 1969, Justesen led a group which attacked the University of Washington Army ROTC.

== Seattle Liberation Front ==
Justesen attended the Seattle Liberation Front's first meeting on January 19, 1970, which was led by the visiting University of Washington philosophy professor Michael Lerner. Susan Stern, the author of With the Weatherman, wrote "The SLF was based on premises exactly opposite to Weatherman, and we were not invited to the first meeting, or to any others for that matter." In response to the Chicago 7 Trial verdict, the SLF issued a call for people to shut down the Seattle Federal Courthouse on February 17, 1970. Dozens of people were arrested, not including Justesen.

On April 16, 1970, a federal grand jury in Seattle indicted eight people for conspiracy to cause damage to Federal property during "The Day After." Justesen was charged along with Susan Stern, Roger Lippman, Joe Kelly, Jeff Dowd, Michael Lerner, Chip Marshall, and Mike Abeles. Justesen went underground in early 1970 before the trial began. The remaining members charged were called the Seattle 7. Judge Boldt declared a mistrial "because the defendants have seriously prejudiced themselves."

== Weather Underground Organization ==
Michael Justesen's fingerprints as well as Karen Ashley, Naomi Jaffe, Bill Ayers, Julie Nichamin, and 16 other Weather Underground member's prints were found by FBI in an abandoned apartment dubbed "Pine Street Bomb Factory" in San Francisco, California. Weather Underground members used the apartment during April 1970 to mid April 1971. FBI inspections found explosives and bomb making paraphernalia.

The Puget Sound Partisan was a publication that identified with the Seattle Liberation Front. In the July 15, 1979, edition, volume 1, #1 a letter from Justesen was published which expressed his feelings.
