= Spiritual left =

Religiously based position of political left

Spiritual left refers to a spiritually or religiously based position that shares the social transformative vision of the political left and its commitment to social justice, peace, economic equality, and (in recent years) ecological consciousness, but who base their commitment on spiritual or religious traditions.

Two present-day examples of spiritual leftism are Jim Wallis, editor of Sojourners magazine, who finds a call for peace and for the elimination of poverty in the Christian Gospel and Rabbi Michael Lerner, editor of Tikkun magazine, calling for a "New Bottom Line" where productivity, efficiency and rationality would be judged not only in material terms, but also in terms of love, generosity, peace, social justice, ecological sanity and awe and wonder at the grandeur of the universe.

== See also ==
- Buddhist socialism
- Christian left
- Christian socialism
- Engaged Spirituality
- Islamic liberalism
- Islamic socialism
- Islamo-leftism
- Jewish left
- Network of Spiritual Progressives
