= Vradenburg =

Vradenburg is a surname. Notable people with the surname include:

- George Vradenburg (born 1943), American lawyer and philanthropist
- Trish Vradenburg (1946–2017), American playwright, author, television writer, and advocate, wife of George

== See also ==
- Vredenburg (disambiguation)
