= Justesen =

Justesen is a surname. Notable people with the surname include:

- Kirsten Justesen (born 1943), Danish artist
- Mads Justesen (born 1982), Danish footballer
- Michael Justesen (born 1950), American activist
- Ole Justesen (born 1946), Danish sport shooter

== See also ==
- Justesen code
