= The Left Hand of God (Lerner book) =

2006 book by Michael Lerner

- Author: Michael Lerner
- Language: English
- Subject: religion, politics
- Publisher: Harper San Francisco
- Publication date: 2006
- Pages: 416
- ISBN: 978-0-06-084247-5
- Preceded by: The Geneva Accord

The Left Hand of God: Taking Back Our Country from the Religious Right is a 2006 book by Rabbi Michael Lerner. In it, Lerner argues that in order for progressive politics to survive in America, liberals must develop a respect for progressive forms of religion that can provide inspiration and a sense of "meaning" in people's lives. Lerner argues that the Religious right seduces many well-intentioned Americans who hunger for higher purpose into supporting political candidates whose policies ultimately exacerbate the spiritual and moral vacuum that creates the desperation that makes the Religious Right appealing in the first place.

The author summarizes:

The unholy alliance of the Political Right and the Religious Right threatens to destroy the America we love. It also threatens to generate a revulsion against God and religion by identifying them with militarism, ecological irresponsibility, fundamentalist antagonism to science and rational thought, and insensitivity to the needs of the poor and the powerless.

The pivotal thesis of Part I is that American culture is dominated by a technocratic rationality and a bottom line of money and power that causes deep levels of depression in a large part of the population. This in turn makes much of the population vulnerable to being easily seduced by authoritarian forms of religion and tempts them to reject liberalism altogether, its strengths as well as its weaknesses. Lerner further argues that the cultural excesses of the Left in the 1960s and 1970s led to backlash in the 1980s. Rabbi Lerner believes that a solution is to develop a progressive form of religion which can speak to people's real spiritual and emotional needs without pulling its followers into the dark side of religion.

Lerner proposes a Spiritual Covenant with America that emphasizes a caring and nurturing society focused not merely on social responsibility but on human connectedness.

== See also ==
- Network of Spiritual Progressives
