= Religious right =

The term religious right may refer to religiously motivated right-wing or conservative movements such as:

- Religious conservatism
- Christian right
- Jewish right
- Hindu nationalism (Hindutva, Sangh Parivar)
- Islamic extremism
- Nippon Kaigi
- Happiness Realization Party

== See also ==
- Islamic fundamentalism
- Religious fundamentalism
- Religious left
