= Susan Stern =

American activist (1943–1976)

Susan Ellen Stern
- Born: Susan Ellen Tanenbaum; January 31, 1943; New York City, U.S.
- Died: July 31, 1976 (aged 33); Seattle, Washington, U.S.
- Education: Syracuse University College of Arts and Sciences
- Known for: Former member of Students for a Democratic Society, Weather Underground Organization and Seattle Liberation Front

Susan Ellen Stern (born Susan Ellen Tanenbaum; January 31, 1943 – July 31, 1976) was an American political activist. She was a member of the prominent anti-Vietnam War groups Students for a Democratic Society (SDS), Weatherman and the Seattle Liberation Front (SLF).

Stern was tried in 1970 on charges of conspiring to damage a federal courthouse as one of the Seattle Seven. The trial ended in a mistrial, due to the defendants' disruptive courtroom behavior. The prosecution's main witness, FBI informer Horace Parker, gave unreliable and problematic testimony against the defendants, particularly under strong cross-examination by Chip Marshall, who defended himself pro se. Stern and her co-defendants; Roger Lippman, Joe Kelly, Jeff Dowd, Michael Lerner, Chip Marshall, and Mike Abeles were summarily convicted only of contempt of court and sentenced to six months in prison, of which Stern served three.

She wrote a memoir about her experiences, titled With the Weathermen: The Personal Journey of a Revolutionary Woman. It was reprinted in September 2007 by Rutgers University Press, with an introduction by Laura Browder, as part of the series Subterranean Lives.

Stern died of drug-related heart and lung failure on July 31, 1976, at University Hospital in Seattle, at the age of 33.

== Early years ==
Susan Stern was born Susan Ellen Tanenbaum, on January 31, 1943, to David and Bernice (Bunny) Tanenbaum in Brooklyn, New York City. Stern was the elder of two children, her younger brother is named Roger. Her parents divorced and after a custody dispute, her father was awarded custody of both children. Stern and her brother subsequently moved to New Jersey with their father when she was nine. Stern's father, a wealthy Jewish businessman, had high expectations of his children, which was difficult for Susan Stern.

== College and married life ==
Upon graduating from high school, Stern entered Syracuse University in New York in the early 1960s. In November 1964, she met Robert F. Stern, her future husband. They married in July 1965. Stern finished her undergraduate work as a Liberal Arts Major and immediately began her Master's study in Urban Education. She taught the sixth grade in a ghetto school in New York. Five months into her studies, Stern was expelled for preaching "communist and subversive doctrines." In 1966, Susan and Robert Stern drove across country, relocated to Seattle, and enrolled in advanced studies at the University of Washington School of Social Work. Robert F. Stern entered the University of Washington School of Law, while Susan Stern pursued a Master's degree in social work, which she completed in June 1968. By then, after nearly three years, the Sterns' marriage had begun to decline. In June 1968, Stern separated from her husband and moved to California.

== Students for a Democratic Society ==
Stern's political activism began around the time that she and her husband moved to Seattle in 1966, when both began to attend classes at the Free University. Following Stern's introduction to political activism, she became involved in the anti-war movement through peaceful protest. In August 1967, both Sterns went to Chicago to attend the New Politics Convention, which she said:

consisted of endless debates between the black militant caucus which controlled the majority of the votes, and the white liberals who were horrified by the black militants. The important thing about the New Politics Convention for Robby and me was that we came in contact with other white radical organizers, among them, Students for a Democratic Society (SDS).

Upon returning to Seattle in the fall of 1967, Stern joined the Seattle chapter of SDS. Throughout the 1967 academic year, both Sterns attended meetings.

== Weatherman ==
Stern attended the SDS National Convention in Chicago in June 1969, where the organization's members split into various factions. At the convention, there was great discussion of the Weatherman paper and arguments among the various chapters of SDS and other activists such as the Black Panther Party erupted throughout the meeting. When Weatherman split off from the SDS, Stern joined Weatherman. After the convention, Stern went back to Seattle and began to prepare for Days of Rage, which would take place in Chicago, on October 8–11, 1969. Stern worked to recruit individuals to join Weatherman for Days of Rage riots. She joined the Seattle Weatherman collective, where her extensive use of drugs, provocative style of dress and habit of supporting the collective by topless dancing earned her enemies among the group's more solemn female leadership. She was expelled after five months because the leadership distrusted her inability to function anonymously within a group and her unwillingness to give in to the group's regular tyrannizing "criticism–self criticism" sessions.

According to Maurice Isserman's review of Stern's 1975 memoir:

Stern ... makes it painfully clear that her own self-loathing and self-destructive bent had much to do with her joining Weatherman (she made one suicide attempt as a child, another in her Seattle days and eventually succumbed in 1976 to a combination of drugs and alcohol that may have constituted a final successful attempt). Stern, who privately thought of herself as "Susan Stern Sham" while projecting a miniskirted and leather-jacketed image of tough sexy femininity, confessed in her memoir to being "obsessed with death and dying .. I fantasized about shootouts with a dozen pigs, killing some of them, and finally getting killed myself .. I had to die with meaning."
