= Bernard Avishai =

Political economist, scholar, and writer (b. 1949)

- ברנרד אבישי
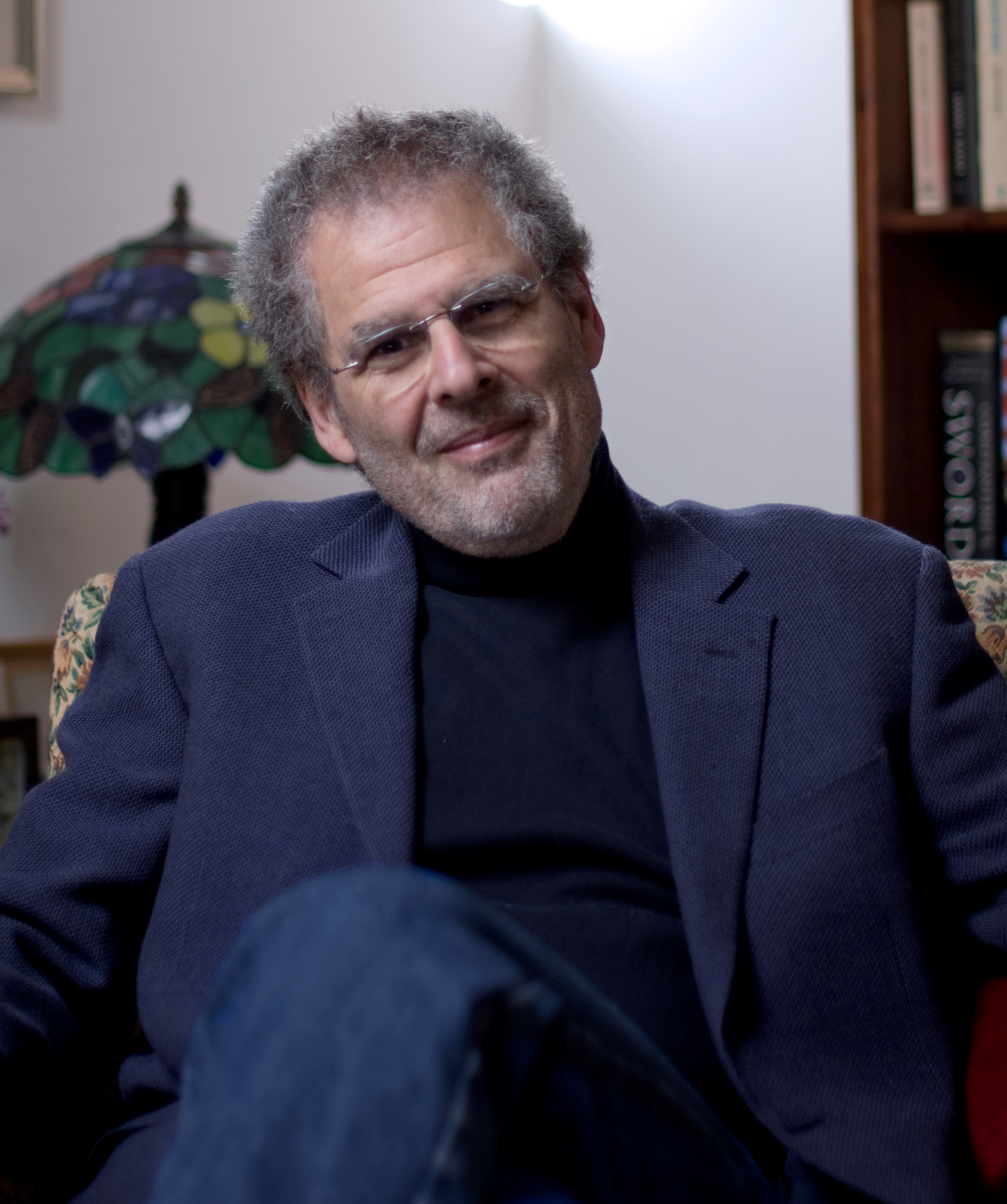
- Born: February 8, 1949 (age 77); Montreal, Quebec, Canada
- Occupations: Writer and business consultant
- Writing career
- Period: 1973–
- Website: bernardavishai.blogspot.com

Bernard Avishai (Hebrew: ברנרד אבישי) is an adjunct professor of business at Hebrew University of Jerusalem. He lives in Jerusalem and the United States. He has taught at Duke University, the Massachusetts Institute of Technology (MIT), and Dartmouth College, and was director of the Zell Entrepreneurship Program at the Interdisciplinary Center Herzliya in Israel. From 1998 to 2001 he was International Director of Intellectual Capital at KPMG LLP. Before this he headed product development at Monitor Group, with which he is still associated. From 1986 to 1991 he was technology editor of Harvard Business Review. A Guggenheim Fellow, Avishai holds a doctorate in political economy from the University of Toronto. Before turning to management, he covered the Middle East as a journalist. He has written many articles and commentaries for The New Yorker, The New York Review of Books, Harvard Business Review, Harper's Magazine and other publications. He is the author of three books on Israel, including the widely read The Tragedy of Zionism, and the 2008 The Hebrew Republic.

== Academic career ==
Bernard Avishai was born in Montreal, Quebec in 1949. The son of the late Ben Shaicovitch, president of Canada's Zionist Men's Association during the 1950s, he volunteered for farm work on an Israeli collective during the Six-Day War, an experience that affected many of his generation. He and his first wife, the artist Susan Avishai, moved to Israel in 1972 while he was still working on a doctorate in political economy for the University of Toronto, and began writing about Israel, the history of Zionism, and the Arab–Israeli conflict. After the October War of 1973, he published a series of political essays in The New York Review of Books, to which he contributed regularly until the mid-1980s. His reports anticipated the 1977 election that brought Menachem Begin and the Israeli right to power for a generation.

Avishai earned his doctorate in 1978, writing mainly on the work of Hobbes and Marx under C. B. Macpherson. He moved to Boston in 1980, where he taught creative writing at MIT, and joined Dissent magazine's editorial board. His first book, The Tragedy of Zionism, was published in 1985 to considerable controversy, since it suggested that Israel's occupation was a symptom of a democracy plagued by anachronistic Zionist institutions and ideas. The controversy led to his being denied tenure at MIT, according to Avishai, and he left for Harvard Business School in 1986. He there took up a position as an editor of Harvard Business Review (HBR). In 1987, he was awarded a Guggenheim Fellowship for continuing work on the writer Arthur Koestler, which led to eventual articles in The New Yorker, Partisan Review, and Salmagundi. His second book, A New Israel, was published in 1990.

Avishai was visiting professor at the Fuqua School of Business and Senior Fellow at the Sanford School of Public Policy at Duke University, where he taught courses on the new economy and public policy.

Today, Avishai serves as a visiting professor specializing in political economy at Dartmouth College in Hanover, New Hampshire.

== Business career ==
His years at HBR, where he became the magazine's technology and strategy editor, changed the direction of his work considerably. He brought to publication dozens of articles on computer-based manufacturing, the implications of burgeoning information networks, and globalization. While preparing to branch off into knowledge management consulting, he began to consider the implications of high technology for Israel's economy and society. In 1991, his last at HBR, he published "Israel's Future: Brainpower, High tech—and Peace" in the magazine, the first to predict Israel's economic opportunity. He then joined Monitor Group as its head of product development, and became International Director of Intellectual Capital at KPMG LLP in 1998. During these years in management consulting, he continued to contribute articles, mainly on Israeli politics and economy, to The New Yorker, The New York Times, The American Prospect, Fortune, and other magazines.

He remains active as a consultant associated with Monitor Group, and has taught entrepreneurial business planning in Libya and other places under its auspices.

== The Hebrew Republic ==
In 2002, he married Sidra DeKoven Ezrahi, a professor of literature at the Hebrew University, and returned to Israel and teaching, becoming director of the Zell Entrepreneurship Program at Interdisciplinary Center Herzliya. In 2005, he wrote the widely cited article "Saving Israel from Itself" in Harper's Magazine, which led to the book The Hebrew Republic. This book argues that Israel's professional elites have made a success of globalization, and have become a natural constituency for a successful peace process; but that Israeli democracy's continuing neglect of its Arab minority, now 1/5 of the country, and the special privileges accorded to Israel's ultra-Orthodox, also 1/5 of the country, is sowing the seeds of a disaster which only a settlement with the Palestinians can prevent. As he puts it in his book, "Israel cannot have an economy like Singapore's through a nationalities war like Serbia's."

== Personal life ==
Avishai is married to Sidra DeKoven Ezrahi. He is the father of three children. He divides his time between homes in Jerusalem and Wilmot, New Hampshire.
