= Seattle Liberation Front =

Anti-Vietnam War movement, 1970 to 1971

- Leader: Michael Lerner
- Dates active: January 19, 1970–1971
- Group: Seattle Seven
- Active regions: Seattle
- Ideology: Anti-authoritarian socialism Anti-war; Marxism–Leninism
- Size: ~15 militants
- Wars: the Opposition to United States involvement in the Vietnam War

The Seattle Liberation Front, or SLF, was a radical anti-Vietnam War movement, based in Seattle, Washington, in the United States. The group, founded by the University of Washington visiting philosophy professor and political activist Michael Lerner, carried out its protest activities from 1970 to 1971. The most famous members of the SLF were the "Seattle Seven," who were charged with "conspiracy to incite a riot" in the wake of a violent protest at a courthouse. The members of the Seattle Seven were Lerner, Michael Abeles, Jeff Dowd, Joe Kelly, Susan Stern, Roger Lippman and Charles Marshall III.

== Formation ==
After the nationwide organization Students for a Democratic Society (SDS) disintegrated in 1969, Michael Lerner, an instructor newly arrived in Seattle from Berkeley, California, felt compelled to start up his own local group. He kick-started his efforts by inviting Jerry Rubin, a notable counterculture figure, to speak on the University of Washington campus on January 17, 1970 – two days later, the SLF was formed, largely composed of students and radicals coming out of organizations (like the SDS) that had recently disbanded. The exact impetus for Lerner seeking a new organization is somewhat vague. The founding of SLF came less than a month after SDS Weatherman, which had staged violent street demonstrations during the latter half of 1969, announced that it was going underground to adopt a strategy of random acts of bombing, arson, and other sabotage. It has not been explained whether or not Lerner was seeking a new organization prior to Weatherman's underground turn. One of the SLF's first actions was to hold a demonstration in support of the Chicago Seven, a group of radicals charged with inciting riots at the 1968 Democratic National Convention.

== Affiliation with Weather Underground ==
The relationship between the Weather Underground and the Seattle Liberation Front remains somewhat ambiguous. Both groups shared many of the same political viewpoints, where they participated in protests and demonstrations, and there was overlap in membership. The violent, confrontational style of protest at events sponsored by SLF was identical with that of the SDS Weatherman faction before the latter went underground at the end of 1969. There were no official ties between the Seattle Liberation Front and the Weather Underground. Chip Marshall was one of the leading members of the Seattle Liberation Front. In an interview with Time magazine in 1980, Marshall commented on the takeover of the SDS by Weatherman, a violent radical left faction. He said Weatherman had established cultural standards to which members were to adhere. Marshall did not agree with destroying monogamy, cutting family ties, and devaluing personal relationships. SLF founder Michael Lerner was never known to be affiliated with the Weather Underground or to endorse its strategy of bombing and arson.

== Sabot (newspaper) ==
Sabot was a brief-lived underground newspaper published by the Seattle Liberation Front from September 11, 1970 to January 13, 1971. Sixteen weekly issues were published in all. The paper was started as a replacement for the Seattle Helix which had published its last issue in June 1970. As with its predecessor, Sabot was from the beginning torn by political dissension within the radical political collective, centering on an internal struggle with feminists over issues of male chauvinism and editorial control and direction. After a few months the divided staff was no longer able to get an issue out and the newspaper quit publishing.

Contributors during its brief run included local underground cartoonist Shary Flenniken and radical feminist Susan Stern, who later published a candid and revealing memoir of her experiences, With the Weathermen, prior to her death in 1976. Several former Sabot staff members later formed the Weatherman-influenced "George Jackson Brigade" collective in the greater Seattle area which ended in a bank robbery and shoot-out in Tukwila, Washington that killed former staffer Bruce Seidel and resulted in the capture of remaining members of the collective.

== Demonstrations ==
SLF planned a demonstration to be held at the Federal Courthouse in downtown Seattle on February 17, 1970. It is commonly referred to by former SLF members as "The Day After" or "TDA." The roughly 2,000 protesters in attendance escalated their protests into violence, throwing rocks and paint bombs at both the courthouse and at police responding to the scene. Twenty were injured in the riot, and 76 were arrested. Michael Lerner stated that it was a different sequence of events: "when it [the demonstration] was attacked by police, it turned into a riot." In March 1970, the Seattle Liberation Front, UW Black Student Union, and the Weathermen organized hundreds of protesters at the University of Washington's campus. The groups wanted the university to sever its athletic links with Brigham Young University, a Mormon school that was accused of racism. Seattle Liberation Front and Black Student Union supporters initiated a riot that moved through eleven buildings at the University of Washington's Seattle campus. Around 200 chanting demonstrators left a trail of damage throughout the campus. Members of the SLF collective based at 814 South Weller Street spoke at a design hearing for the then-proposed I-90 freeway in June 1970, denouncing the project as "racist" and advocating revolution.

== Indictments and trial ==
Two months later, on April 16, a federal grand jury indicted members of the SLF on charges of inciting the February 17 riot – Lerner was charged with "using the facilities of interstate commerce [a telephone] with the intent of inciting to riot," but he was not charged with "inciting to riot." (One of the eight, Michael Justesen, disappeared but was later arrested in California by the FBI in an infiltration of the Weathermen). Federal District Judge George Boldt was assigned the case, which began in his Tacoma courtroom on November 23, 1970. The trial was quickly derailed by the defendants' vocal disruptions including catcalls directed at the judge, a protest walkout, and their eventual refusal to enter the courtroom. Boldt declared a mistrial on December 10, citing all defendants for contempt of court. He summarily found them guilty of contempt, sentenced them to six months in prison, and refused to grant bail. The defendants eventually served three months in prison.

The original charges of inciting a riot, or of intent to incite to riot, and conspiracy to damage the Seattle Federal Building, were unsuccessfully prosecuted. Lerner stated the reason for the failure to win a conviction was "because it was revealed that the FBI agents who were infiltrating the anti-war organization were themselves the people who had precipitated the violence." Most observers agreed that the prosecution's case was floundering (aided by the admission of government witnesses on the stand that they would "go to any length" to combat the radicals). It is believed by some that the Seattle Seven would have been freed if they had not provoked the judge during the proceedings.

== Aftermath and recent activities ==
Due to the publicity of the trial, the Seattle Liberation Front faced ideological dissension, personality conflicts, and charges of "male chauvinism." In the fall of 1970 SLF sponsored a short-lived weekly underground newspaper, Sabot, which folded in December after a three-month run amid political infighting among the staff. In late 1971, the SLF was disbanded. Many of the individual SLF members continued to promote diverse social movements, such as Capitol Hill's Country Doctor Clinic. Lerner, the founder of SLF, eventually became the editor of Tikkun and an advisor to President Bill Clinton and Hillary Clinton. Jeff Dowd went to Hollywood to become a screenwriter and producer. Chip Marshall remained active in Washington politics, running for Seattle City Council in 1975 and working as a neighborhood activist in Issaquah.

== Cultural references ==
In the movie The Big Lebowski, the main character Jeffrey "The Dude" Lebowski says, "Did you ever hear of the Seattle Seven? That was me ... and six other guys." This refers to Jeff Dowd's involvement in the Seattle Seven. He was a friend of the Coen brothers and an inspiration for the character "The Dude."

== Additional Reading ==
- Federal Bureau of Investigation, "Weather Underground Organization (Weatherman)", (Illinois: Chicago Field Office 1976).
- Biographical Notes on Rabbi Lerner (Tikkun Magazine, 2342 Shattuck Avenue, #1200, Berkeley, CA 94704) 2012.
