= Sidra DeKoven Ezrahi =

American-born Israeli professor emerita of Comparative Literature

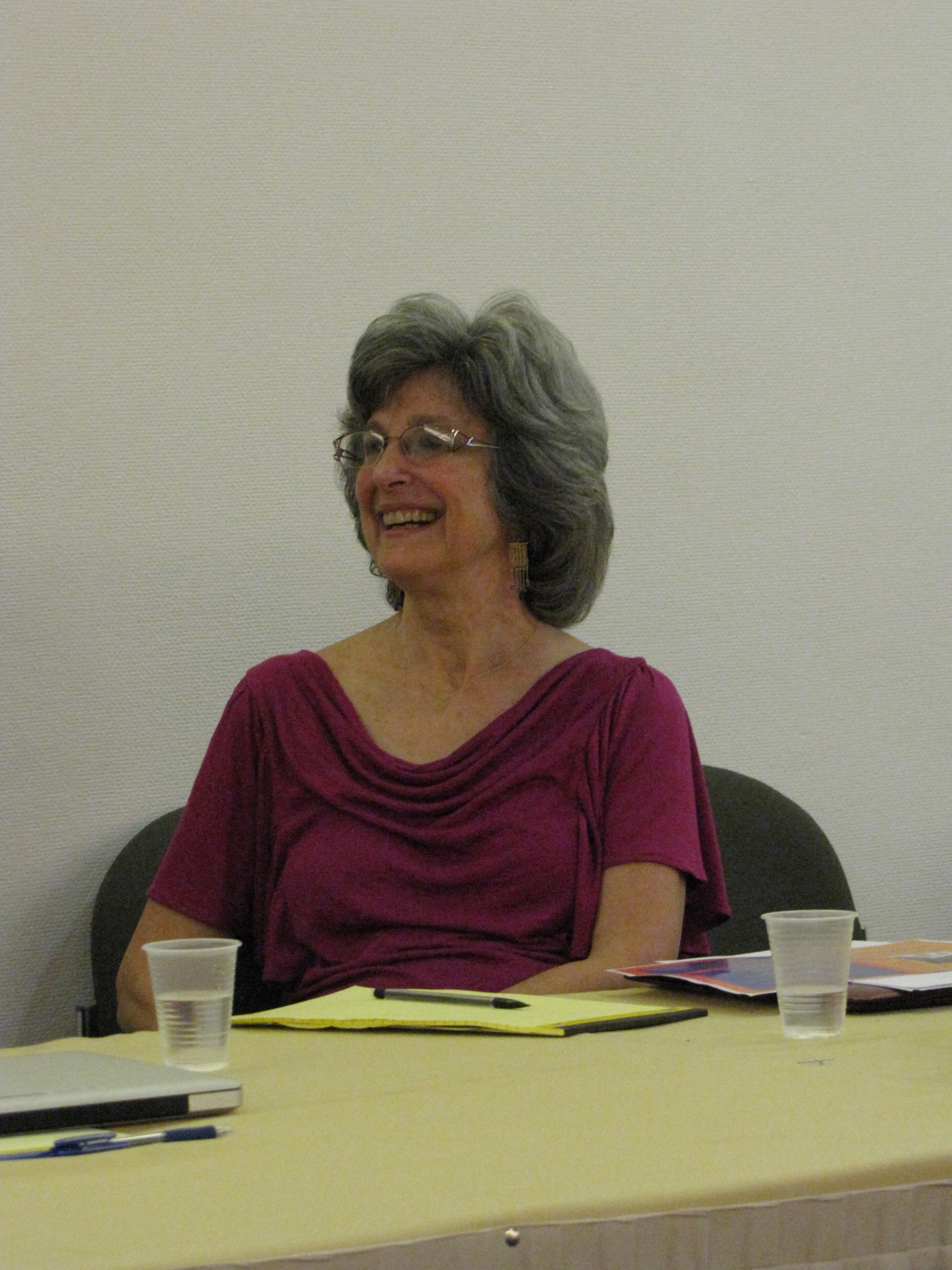
Sidra DeKoven Ezrahi

Sidra DeKoven Ezrahi (Hebrew: סידרא דקובן מזרחי; born October 31, 1942) is Professor Emerita of Comparative Literature at the Hebrew University of Jerusalem.

== Early life and education ==
Sidra DeKoven Ezrahi is the daughter of Janet and Herman DeKoven. Her mother was a social worker born in Ostrowiec, Poland, who at age 12 immigrated to the United States with her family. Her father was a lawyer born in Chicago, Illinois.

DeKoven Ezrahi was born in Washington D.C. and grew up in Highland Park, Illinois. She attended Wellesley College and spent her junior year at the Hebrew University, where she subsequently completed her bachelor's degree in English and Political Science (1966). DeKoven Ezrahi returned to the United States and received her M.A. (1968) and PhD (1976) in English and American literature from Brandeis University..

== Career ==
In 1978, DeKoven Ezrahi was appointed head of the literature section at the Institute for Contemporary Jewry at the Hebrew University. She also taught at the Rothberg School for Overseas Students at Hebrew University and served as the head of the Department of Humanities at the "Mechina", the University's academic preparatory program. In 2008, Ezrahi joined the Hebrew University's Department of General and Comparative Literature. In 2011 she retired as Full Professor.

She was visiting professor at Yale University, Princeton University, University of Michigan, Dartmouth, University of Toronto and Susquehanna University.

DeKoven Ezrahi served as academic advisor to the Jewish Museum in New York (1999-2000); she received grants from the Memorial Foundation for Jewish Culture and from the National Endowment for the Humanities (NEH). In 2007, DeKoven Ezrahi was awarded the Guggenheim Fellowship for her project on Jerusalem (see publications, below).

DeKoven Ezrahi has been a member of the editorial boards of Tikkun, History and Memory and Teoriya u-vikoret (Hebrew). She has written reviews and opinion pieces for The New Republic, Haaretz, Tikkun, Salmagundi and others.

DeKoven Ezrahi was awarded an Honorary Doctorate by Hebrew Union College, Jerusalem in 2019.

She is a peace activist in Israel and when the First Intifada broke out she was one of the initiators of a dialogue group in Jerusalem with Palestinian residents of Beit Sahour.

== Works ==
DeKoven Ezrahi's early work engaged with representations of the Holocaust in literature and culture. Her book, By Words Alone: The Holocaust in Literature, was published by the University of Chicago Press in 1980 and was nominated for the National Jewish Book Award in 1981.

DeKoven Ezrahi went on to focus on the Holocaust as a shifting component in the works of Israeli writers from S.Y. Agnon, Aharon Appelfeld and Dan Pagis to David Grossman. In the late 20th and early 21st centuries, she took part in discussions within the new theoretical field initiated by Saul Friedlander that dared to probe the "limits of representation.". "Booking Passage: On Exile and Homecoming in the Modern Jewish Imagination" published in 2000 by the University of California Press, explores the Jewish Journey and the trope of "return" in Jewish literature, beginning with the poems of Juda Halevi in the 12th century. It was nominated for the Koret Prize in 2001. A version of the first half of the book was published in Hebrew as "Ipus ha-masa ha-yehudi" (Resling Press 2017). "Shlosha Paytanim, a study of three poets of the “Sacred Quotidian”—Paul Celan, Dan Pagis and Yehuda Amichai" was published by Mossad Bialik in 2020. In her later writing, DeKoven Ezrahi posits a generic range of Jewish literature in the twentieth century on three continents. In contrast to the tragic Jewish narrative prevailing in Europe after the shoah and the epic narrative of modern Israel, American Jewish literature has a special place in the writings of DeKoven Ezrahi as a stage for "the Jewish comedy". In many essays, but particularly in monographs on Philip Roth and Grace Paley, she points to the moment in the middle of the twentieth century when the barriers were lifted and the comic potential was unleashed at the intersections between modern Jewish and Christian religious imaginations.

DeKoven Ezrahi's latest publications focus on post-1967 Israel, specifically on the yearning for physical proximity to the Sacred Center following Israel's victory in Jerusalem. "When Exiles Return", "From Auschwitz to the Temple Mount: Binding and Unbinding the Israeli Narrative" and '"To what shall I compare thee?' Jerusalem as Ground Zero of the Hebrew Imagination", explore these dilemmas. Their resolutions are articulated in the fiction of S.Y.Agnon and the poetry of Yehuda Amichai. These arguments coalesce in "Figuring Jerusalem: Politics and Poetics in the Sacred Center" [Sidra DeKoven Ezrahi: Figuring Jerusalem: Politics and Poetics in the Sacred Center 2022, Chicago: University of Chicago Press], Awarded the National Jewish Book Award in 2023.( https://www.jewishbookcouncil.org/book/figuring-jerusalem-politics-and-poetics-in-the-sacred-center), which provides new readings of biblical and medieval texts and imagines a dialogue between these classical texts and the two scribes of modern Jerusalem, Agnon and Amichai.

== Publications ==
- DeKoven Ezrahi, Sidra (1980). By Words Alone: The Holocaust in Literature. Chicago: University of Chicago Press. ISBN 978-0-226-23335-2. (nominated for the National Jewish Book Award in 1981)
- DeKoven Ezrahi, Sidra (2000). Booking Passage: On Exile and Homecoming in the Modern Jewish Imagination. Berkeley: University of California Press. (nominated for the Koret Jewish Book Award in 2001)
- DeKoven Ezrahi, Sidra (2017). Ipus ha-masa ha-yehudi: Galut ve-shiva ba-sifrut ha-yehudit ha-modernit. Tel Aviv: Resling.
- DeKoven Ezrahi, Sidra (2020). Shlosha Paytanim:Paul Celan, Dan Pagis, Yehuda Amichai. Jerusalem: Mossad Bialik.
- DeKoven Ezrahi, Sidra (2022). Figuring Jerusalem: Politics and Poetics in the Sacred Center. Chicago: Chicago: University of Chicago Press. Awarded the National Jewish Book Award in 2023.( https://www.jewishbookcouncil.org/book/figuring-jerusalem-politics-and-poetics-in-the-sacred-center)

== Personal life ==
DeKoven Ezrahi is married to Bernard Avishai, a writer, journalist and academic. They live alternately in Jerusalem and in New Hampshire. She has three children from her marriage to her first husband, Yaron Ezrahi. and three stepchildren. Together, DeKoven Ezrahi and Bernard Avishai have eleven grandchildren.
