= Trish Vradenburg =

American dramatist

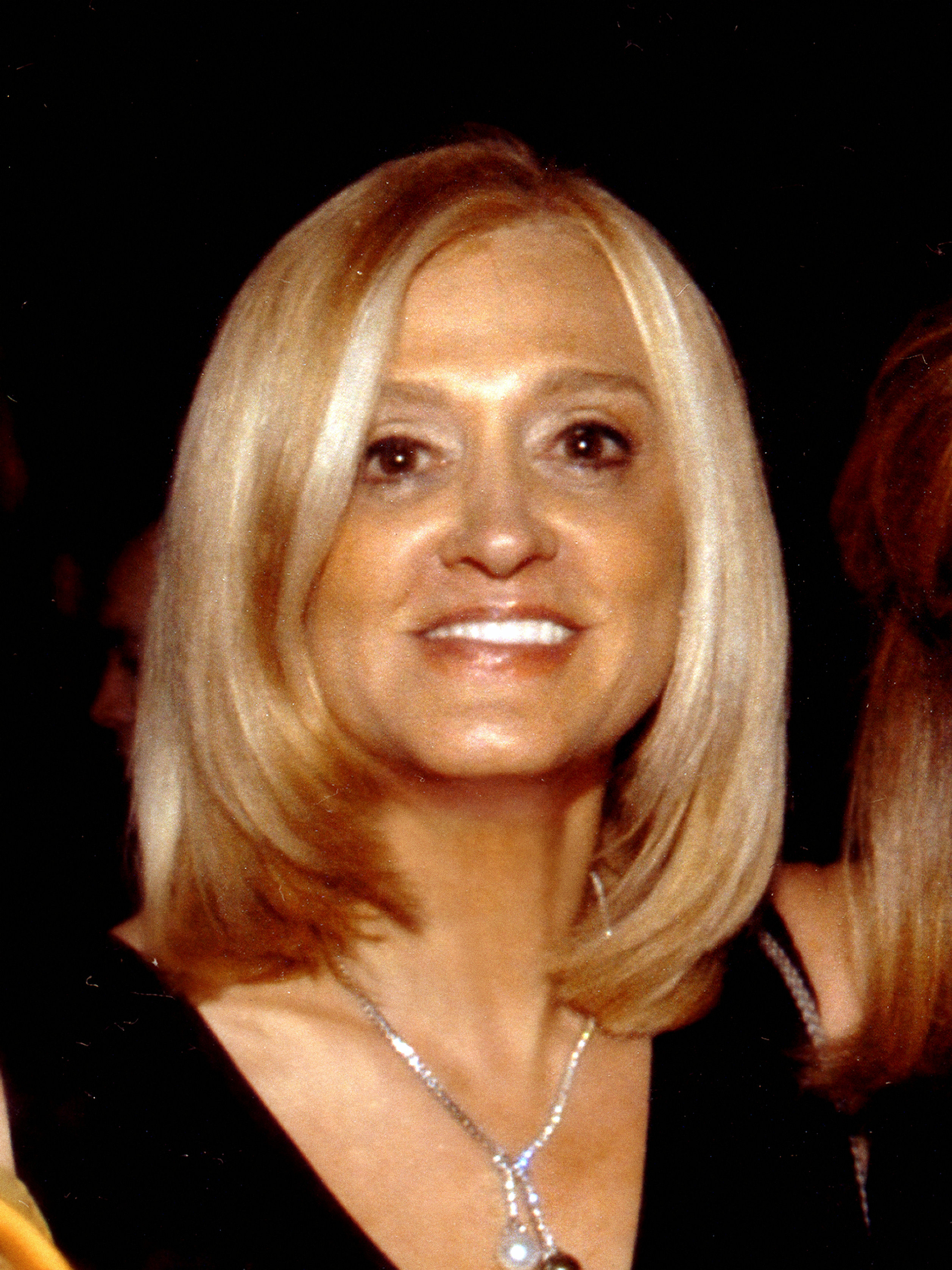
- Vradenburg in 2007
- Born: May 9, 1946; Newark, New Jersey, US
- Died: April 17, 2017 (aged 70); Washington, D.C., U.S.
- Occupations: Writer; advocate; philanthropist

Trish Vradenburg (May 9, 1946 – April 17, 2017) was an American playwright, author, television writer, and advocate of research to cure Alzheimer's disease.

== Biography ==
Vradenburg was born in Newark, New Jersey, the daughter of Beatrice and Judge Joseph Lerner. She graduated from Boston University in 1968 and became a speech writer for Senator Harrison A. Williams (D-NJ).

She was a writer on three television shows. In addition, she wrote the novel Liberated Lady (1986) as well as the plays The Apple Doesn't Fall… and Surviving Grace. Both of those plays are accounts of Vradenburg's time as an Alzheimer's caregiver for her mother, who died of the disease in 1991. Vradenburg is survived by her husband, former AOL executive and venture philanthropist George Vradenburg. In 2008, the Vradenburgs founded US Against Alzheimer's, a national advocacy network dedicated to stopping Alzheimer's. In 2012, Capitol File magazine named Trish and George Vradenburg on their list of Washington's top power couples for the philanthropy and advocacy efforts. She was also a member of the board of Theater J and DC Vote.

== Books ==
In 1986 Macmillan Publishers published Vradenburg's novel, Liberated Lady, which was described as a "comedic romance with a dash of politics." The book was chosen as Literary Guild and Doubleday Book Club selections. Further, Vradenburg was published in the anthology Chicken Soup for the Romantic Soul in 2000.

== Television ==
In 1986, she became a writer for the show Designing Women. In addition, she also wrote for the shows Kate & Allie and Family Ties. Her shows dealt with topics including abortion, homosexuality, race relations and high school reunions. She also wrote a pilot about life at a home shopping network, The Shopping Maul, for Merv Griffin Productions. She was the on-air host of Book This Show with Trish, a book show for Q2.

== Plays ==
Vradenburg wrote the play The Apple Doesn't Fall... which was produced at the Tiffany Theater in Los Angeles and on Broadway at the Lyceum Theatre in New York City, and Surviving Grace which was produced at the Kennedy Center in Washington and off-Broadway at the Union Square Theatre in New York. Surviving Grace was translated into Portuguese and produced in Brazil. Surviving Grace is published by Broadway Play Publishing Inc.

== Print media ==
Trish and George Vradenburg served as co-publishers of Tikkun (2002-2012), a bi-monthly English-language magazine that analyzes American and Israeli culture, politics, religion and history from a leftist-progressive viewpoint, and provides commentary about Israeli politics and Jewish life in North America. She has also had opinion pieces published in several newspapers, including The Washington Post.

== Alzheimer's advocacy ==
She and her husband chaired the National Alzheimer's Gala in Washington, D.C. (2004-2010) which raised over $9 million for the Alzheimer's Association. In 2010 they launched US Against Alzheimer's (USA2), an independent organization whose mission is to stop Alzheimer's disease by the year 2020.

== Death ==
Vradenburg died of a heart attack on April 17, 2017. She was interred at Hillside Memorial Park Cemetery.
