= Engaged spirituality =

Form of spirituality

Engaged spirituality refers to the beliefs and practices of religious or spiritual people who actively engage in the world in order to transform it in ways consistent with their beliefs.

== Overview ==
The term was inspired by engaged Buddhism, a concept and set of values developed by the Vietnamese Buddhist monk Thich Nhat Hanh. Engaged spirituality encompasses all the major faith traditions as well as people who refer to themselves as "spiritual but not religious." There are many iterations in practice, but the overarching desire for social transformation unites them.

For some in the Catholic tradition, liberation theology guides their form of engaged spirituality.

== Common characteristics ==
Practitioners of this mode of spirituality tend to hold progressive values which galvanize their efforts for social change. Their actions are informed by their overarching faith tradition. The connection between personal and social transformation requires them to engage in social and political activism. Examples include peace activism, civil rights and human rights activism for minority groups, environmental activism and service on behalf of the poor and homeless.

It may be contrasted with "pop spirituality", which concerns itself primarily with personal psychological betterment and lacks a deep commitment to social engagement.

Engaged spirituality involves a blend of individual experiences and collective activities in the community. The two can support, shape and transform each other. For example, prayer or meditation may serve as a way for an individual to gather strength and gain insight that can guide and enhance the effectiveness of their efforts in working for social change. Their communal experiences may also influence their prayer or meditation experiences. This can lead to a continual interwoven process of spiritual growth and a deeper commitment to improving one's local or global community.

== See also ==
- Network of Spiritual Progressives, an interfaith chapter-based organization
- Sojourners, Christian-based social justice advocacy and awareness-building
