= Seattle Weather Collective =

Collective of Weather Underground

- The Weather Underground symbol
- Dates active: 1969-1970?
- Active regions: Seattle
- Ideology: Marxism–Leninism; Communism; Anti-imperialism; New Left
- Part of: Weather Underground
- Wars: the Opposition to United States involvement in the Vietnam War

The Weather Underground organized collectives around the United States in an attempt "to challenge the state directly in solidarity with Third World liberation movements, particularly the Black Power movement in the United States and the Vietnamese in Southeast Asia." Collectives organized the white working class against imperialism by holding militant demonstrations and engaging in small scale property damage.

== Formation of the Seattle Collective ==
During the Ave Riots in Seattle's University District on August 10–14, 1969, the women who were participating came together and from this bonding experience, formed "the core of the Seattle Weathermen". The Ave Riots were part of larger actions around the country protesting the Vietnam War. Rioters in Seattle were also protesting police brutality, but news reports from the time claim that the group was just "teenagers looking for trouble." However, less than a week after these Riots, the Seattle Weather Collective was formed.

== Preparing for Chicago's Days of Rage ==
The first item on the Seattle collective's agenda was to help organize for the Days of Rage that would be in Chicago in October 1969. Members of the Seattle collective produced pamphlets about the Days of Rage in order to raise awareness of the event and encourage people to travel to Chicago to participate.

=== Jailbreaks ===
Members of the Seattle Collective would visit several high schools a day in an attempt to recruit members and encourage students to travel to Chicago for the Days of Rage. They titled this action jailbreaks, taking over classrooms while one member stood on a desk speaking to the students. Other members would block doorways and telephones so no one of authority could be notified to what was going on. Others would spray paint the group's slogans on the blackboards.

== ROTC attacks ==
Reserve Officers' Training Corps centers were a popular place for protesting. These offices are where college students are trained for the U.S. military. In May 1970 alone, "thirty ROTC buildings were burned or bombed and National Guard units were mobilized on twenty-one campuses in sixteen states." By protesting these offices that prepare officers for war, Weather Underground was protesting an "empire [that] feeds on war."

=== September 30, 1969 ===
Female members of the collective stormed the Air Force ROTC office on the University of Washington campus. They "spray [painted] walls, throwing ink bombs, and resisting ROTC cadets who tried to detain them". The women surprised the ROTC cadets who were chasing them by turning back for a member who had been detained and attacking the men.

=== October 02, 1969 ===
News of the September 30th ROTC attack attracted three hundred people to a rally that preceded the Students for a Democratic Society's first meeting of the year in Seattle. Following several speakers, Susan Stern stood up and declared "we're going to smash an ROTC building". A group of people jumped up and followed Stern to the University of Washington's Clark Hall where there was an ROTC office. Once again, the group spray painted walls and resisted the cadets trying to stop them. No one was arrested for this action. The University of Washington later banned six non-students who had been present for the action.

=== December 01, 1969 ===
The ROTC office in the University of Washington's Savery Hall was attacked. This was the final straw for the University of Washington, they no longer recognized Students for a Democratic Society as a student organization on their campus.

=== January 18, 1970 ===
On the day before the Seattle Liberation Front's organizing meeting, two members of the Seattle collective, Trim Bissell and his wife Judith were caught planting a bomb under the Air Force ROTC building at the University of Washington.

=== April 30, 1970 ===
President Nixon announced he was sending United States troops into Cambodia. Protests erupted around the country, and Seattle. On the University of Washington campus, ROTC offices were attacked in a similar manner to previous Weather Underground attacks on the ROTC offices and Downtown demonstrators attacked the Boeing Employment Center.
