= Tikkun (magazine) =

American magazine

- January/February 2007 issue
- Editor: Michael Lerner
- Frequency: quarterly
- Circulation: 18,000
- Publisher: Duke University Press
- Founded: 1986
- Final issue: May 2024
- Country: United States
- Based in: Berkeley, California
- Website: www.tikkun.org
- ISSN: 0887-9982

Tikkun was a quarterly progressive Jewish and interfaith magazine and website published in the United States that analyzed American and Israeli culture, politics, religion, and history in the English language. The magazine consistently published the work of Israeli and Palestinian left-wing intellectuals, but also included book and music reviews, personal essays, and poetry.

In 2006 and 2011, the magazine was awarded the Independent Press Award for Best Spiritual Coverage by Utne Reader for its analysis of the inability of many progressives to understand people's yearning for faith and the American fundamentalists' political influence on the international conflict among religious zealots.

The magazine was founded in 1986 by Michael Lerner and his then-wife, Nan Fink Gefen. From 2012 onward, its publisher was Duke University Press. Beyt Tikkun Synagogue, with Michael Lerner as its rabbi, was loosely affiliated with Tikkun magazine. It described itself as a "hallachic community bound by Jewish law".

In April 2024, the magazine announced it was ceasing publication due to a lack of funding and the poor health of Lerner (who could not find a successor).

== Origin and meaning of the name ==
The magazine's title came from the Hebrew term tikkun olam (Hebrew: תיקון עולם; "healing or restoring the world"), a concept emphasizing humanity's and God's co-responsibility "to heal, repair and transform the world".

== Publisher ==
Initially, Nan Fink Gefen, at the time married to Lerner, devoted financial resources and served as a hands-on publisher until she left as their marriage ended in 1991. In 1997, fellow 1960s activist Danny Goldberg, a major music industry figure who was heavily involved in the ACLU, became co-publisher with his father, Victor. During these years, prominent journalists such as Jack Newfield interviewed national and international leaders such as Mario Cuomo and Haiti's embattled President Aristide to bring more credibility to the growing influence of the magazine. From 2001 through 2010, Lerner's sister, Trish Vradenburg, and her husband George Vradenburg served as co-publishers.

== Editorial policy ==
Founded in 1986, the magazine's editorial policy was shaped by Nan Fink Gefen, Michael Lerner, and Peter Gabel. According to the founding editorial statement, political concerns of the 1960s civil rights, anti-war, and feminist movements and psychological studies of workers in the 1970s and 1980s were their most direct influences. Among authors who contributed to the magazine's interfaith character were the historian Christopher Lasch, philosopher Cornel West, and Harvey Cox of Harvard Divinity School.

Obliquely confronting more conservative American Jewish community's Commentary Magazine, which caused some members of the Editorial Board, including Elie Wiesel, to resign, the magazine introduced itself with prominent ads placed in leading intellectual papers and journals declaring a new voice for the Jewish Left. Rabbi Abraham Joshua Heschel's legacy of "prophetic" Jewish activism has been honored and analyzed from the first issue onward. In every issue, it was stated that its articles "do not necessarily reflect Tikkun's position on any issue", and its editor, Rabbi Michael Lerner, has written that he "often consciously seeks to print articles with which he disagrees".

== Network of Spiritual Progressives ==
In 2001 the magazine's interfaith activist community's website, the Network of Spiritual Progressives, initially named the Tikkun Community, was established by founders that include Sister Joan Chittister, a Benedictine nun, and Cornel West, a Princeton University professor of religion, in order to engage readers in broader activism and broaden the magazine's appeal to non-Jewish readers. Challenging the anti-religious and anti-spiritual biases within liberal culture and "replacing world domination with generosity" are among the ideas that are supported by the community.

== Reception ==
In her book, If I Am Not For Myself: The Liberal Betrayal of the Jews, American conservative author Ruth Wisse argues that Tikkun is one of a group of left-of-center Jewish organizations and publications founded in the 1980s without explaining why a new, Jewish publication was needed to cover issues already covered by such existing publications as Dissent. Wisse argues that the actual motivation was a need felt by highly educated Jews to counter rising antisemitism on the left by means of "public avowals of kindliness and liberalism."

=== Accusations of antisemitism ===
In 2005 Manfred Gerstenfeld cited an article published by Tikkun — Joel Kovel’s "On Left Anti-Semitism and the Special Status of Israel" (May/June 2003) — as one of two examples of "essays of Jewish authors using anti-Semitic arguments". In his article, Kovel described Israel as a racist state that "automatically generates crimes against humanity and lacks the internal means of correcting them", adding that such a state "cannot have that legitimacy which gives it the right to exist".

In a 2006 column, Alan Dershowitz wrote that "Tikkun is quickly becoming the most virulently anti-Israel screed ever published under Jewish auspices" and that "support for Tikkun is support for the enemies of Israel". Dershowitz and his books have been the targets of criticism in the pages of Tikkun (for example: May/June 1997, September/October 1997, November/December 1997, January/February 1999).

=== Improprieties regarding letters to the editor ===
In 1997 former Tikkun editors accused Lerner of publishing pseudonymous letters to the editor that he himself had written. While many of the letters were laudatory ("Your editorial stand on Iraq said publicly what many of us in the Israeli peace camp are feeling privately but dare not say."), a few were critical ("Have you gone off your rocker?"). Lerner admitted that he had written the letters but said his only mistake was not informing readers that the authors' names were pseudonyms.

== Contributors ==
Notable contributors have included Sidra DeKoven Ezrahi, Everett Gendler, Arthur Waskow, and Jeremy Ben-Ami.

=== Notable interviews ===
- Noam Chomsky
- Ehud Barak
- Nicholas Kristof
- Jim Moran

== Awards ==
Tikkun won the Magazine of the Year: Overall Excellence award from the Religion Newswriters Association in 2014 and 2015. The magazine also received the Simon Rockower Award for Excellence in Special Sections or Supplements in 2009.
