= Michael Lerner (rabbi) =

American activist and editor (1943–2024)

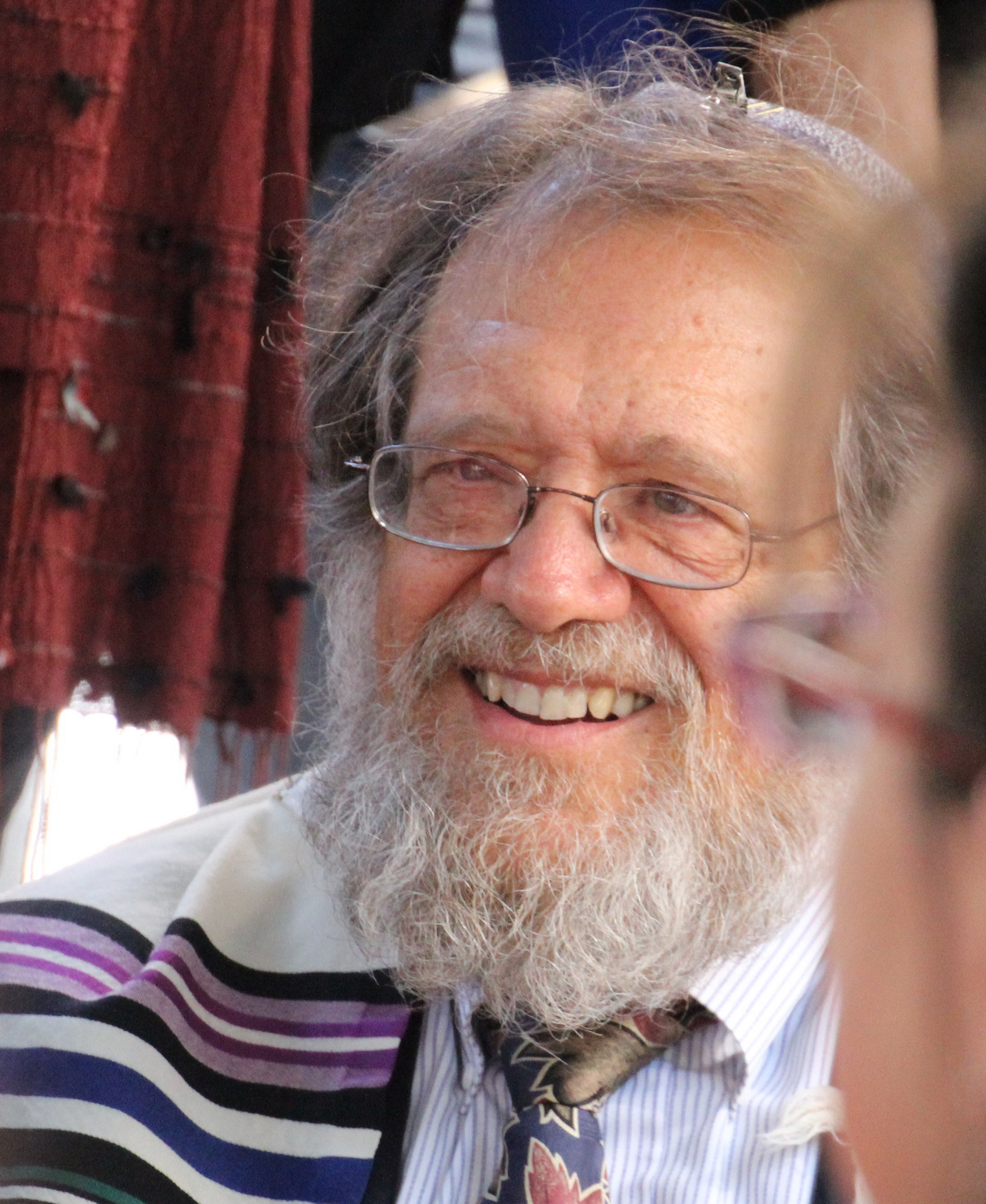
- Lerner at Occupy Oakland, 2011
- Born: February 7, 1943; Newark, New Jersey, U.S.
- Died: August 28, 2024 (aged 81); Berkeley, California, U.S.
- Education: Columbia University, University of California, Berkeley; Wright Institute
- Occupations: Rabbi; editor
- Employers: Beyt Tikkun Synagogue; Tikkun
- Spouses: Theirrie Cook (divorced); Nan Fink (div. 1991); Deborah Kohn-Lerner (m. 1998; div. 2014); Cat Zavis (m. 2015; sep. 2024)
- Children: Akiba Jeremiah Lerner

Michael Phillip Lerner (February 7, 1943 (Note: A 2018 post from Tikkun gave Lerner's birthday as February 7. Other sources have replicated this, but some have given his birth date as February 11.) – August 28, 2024) was an American political activist, the founder and editor of Tikkun, a progressive Jewish interfaith magazine based in Berkeley, California, and the rabbi of Beyt Tikkun Synagogue in Berkeley.

As a political activist, Lerner is best known as the leader of the Seattle Seven, an anti-Vietnam protest group that was the subject of an investigation by the FBI and subsequent trial, where charges were later found to be unconstitutional.

== Early life and education ==
Michael Lerner was born on February 7, 1943, and grew up in the Weequahic section of Newark, New Jersey. In his youth, he attended Far Brook Country Day School, a private school that he characterized as having "a rich commitment to interdenominational Christianity". While he has written that he appreciated "the immense beauty and wisdom of the Christianity to which [he] was being exposed", he also felt religiously isolated, as the child of passionate Zionists who attended Hebrew school three times a week, while at the same time being heavily exposed to Christian-oriented cultural activities in school.

At his own request, in the 7th grade Lerner switched to a public school in the Weequahic neighborhood of Newark, where his peers were, in his estimation, 80% Jewish. He graduated from Weequahic High School in 1960. Lerner earned a BA degree from Columbia University, and in 1972 he earned a PhD in philosophy from the University of California, Berkeley. In 1977 he received a PhD in Clinical/Social Psychology from the Wright Institute in Berkeley.

== Activism and the Seattle Seven ==
=== Early activism ===
While at Berkeley, Lerner became a leader in the Berkeley student movement and the Free Speech Movement, chair of the Free Student Union, and chair from 1966 to 1968 of the Berkeley chapter of the Students for a Democratic Society (SDS).

=== The Seattle Seven ===
Lerner taught philosophy of law at San Francisco State University, and later took a job as an assistant professor of philosophy at the University of Washington.

Distressed over the disintegration of SDS in 1969, Lerner sought to re-organize the SDS into a new organization called the Seattle Liberation Front (SLF) on January 19, 1970. While SLF did not publicly endorse violence as a political tactic, SLF members including Roger Lippman, Michael Justesen, and Susan Stern were also members of the Weather Underground, which had bombing attacks as a central part of its political strategy. After the "Day After" demonstration SLF had called on February 17, 1970 (to protest the verdicts in the Chicago Seven trial) turned violent, Lerner and others were arrested and charged with inciting a riot.

Lerner and his co-defendants became known as the "Seattle Seven". During their trial, FBI Director J. Edgar Hoover issued a public statement (repeated on radio and television) that described Lerner as "one of the most dangerous criminals in America", even though he had never engaged in any act of violence. Federal agents testifying at the trial later admitted to having played a major role instigating the violence and ensuing riot.

The trial culminated in a courtroom brawl (during which Lerner was the only defendant to remain seated), and the presiding judge sent the defendants to jail on contempt of court charges. Lerner was transported to Terminal Island Federal Penitentiary in San Pedro, California, where he served several months before the 9th Circuit Federal Court of Appeals overturned his conviction for contempt of court and ordered him released.

==== Legal results and the Lerner Act ====
The main charges relating to the riot were subsequently dropped by the federal government.

Meanwhile, the Washington State Legislature had passed a law, commonly referred to as the "Lerner Act", that prohibited the University of Washington from hiring anyone "who might engage in illegal political activity", and Lerner's contract was not renewed. (The law was later overturned by the Washington Supreme Court.)

== Professorship and research ==
After completing his Ph.D. Lerner moved to Hartford, Connecticut where he served as professor of philosophy at Trinity College until 1975, when he moved back to Berkeley, joined the faculty at the University of California in the Field Studies program and taught law and economics until 1976 when he accepted a position at Sonoma State University for one year in sociology, teaching courses in social psychology. Meanwhile, he completed a second Ph.D. in 1977, this one in social/clinical psychology at the Wright Institute in Berkeley.

In 1976 Lerner founded the Institute for Labor and Mental Health to work with the labor movement and do research on the psychodynamics of American society. In 1979 he received a grant from the National Institute of Mental Health to train union shop stewards as agents of prevention for mental health disorders, and he simultaneously extended his previous study of the psychodynamics of American society. With a subsequent grant from the NIMH he studied American politics and reported that "a spiritual crisis" was at the heart of the political transformation of American society as well as at the heart of much of the psychic pain that was being treated in individual therapy. His writing also reflected a transposition of this analysis to economics.

== Tikkun magazine ==
After serving for five years as dean of the graduate school of psychology at New College of California (now defunct) in San Francisco, Lerner and his then-wife Nan Fink created a general-interest intellectual magazine called Tikkun: A Bimonthly Jewish Critique of Politics, Culture and Society. Tikkun was started with the intention of challenging the Left for its inability to understand the centrality of religious and spiritual concerns in the lives of ordinary Americans.

With his associate editor Peter Gabel, Lerner developed a "politics of meaning": that Americans hunger not only for material security but also for a life that is connected to some higher meaning, and that the failure of the liberal and progressive movements to win a consistent majority support was based on their inability to understand this hunger and to address it by showing Americans and middle income working people in other advanced industrial societies that it was the values of the competitive marketplace and its Bottom Line of money and power that is the fundamental source undermining ethical and spiritual values in the public sphere and then undermining friendships and marriages when these values are brought home into personal life.

This was intended to speak to the hunger for meaning that was characteristic of the thousands of people that Lerner and his colleagues were studying at the Institute for Labor and Mental Health. Tikkun was formed to educate the public about the findings of the Institute and to develop some of the implications of that work. However, because it also had an interest in being an "alternative to the voices of Jewish conservatism," Tikkun was criticized by some Jewish groups.

In 1993, First Lady Hillary Clinton included the "politics of meaning" in her synthesis of political and social philosophy she was forming.

In 2002, Lerner organized a group called the Tikkun Community among readers of Tikkun magazine and those who share its editorial vision.

== Rabbinical ordination ==
Lerner received rabbinical ordination in 1995 through a beth din (rabbinical court) composed of three rabbis, "each of whom had received orthodox rabbinic ordination".

According to j. the Jewish news weekly, "mainstream rabbinical leaders of the Reform, Conservative and Orthodox movements" have questioned private ordinations such as Lerner's, arguing that non-seminary ordinations risk producing poorly educated or fraudulent Rabbis.

In 1997, Lerner became the first Jewish Renewal rabbi to achieve membership in a local American Board of Rabbis. Since that time, many local Boards of Rabbis have accepted Jewish Renewal rabbis into full membership.

=== Beyt Tikkun Synagogue ===
Beyt Tikkun Synagogue is a Jewish Renewal congregation in the San Francisco Bay Area founded in 1996 by Lerner and is loosely affiliated with his Tikkun magazine.

San Francisco Chronicle as well as The New York Times called it the "synagogue-without-walls in San Francisco and Berkeley".

=== Network of Spiritual Progressives ===
In 2005 Lerner became chair of The Network of Spiritual Progressives whose mission was to "challenge the materialism and selfishness in American society and to promote an ethos of love, generosity, and awe and wonder at the grandeur of the universe." They have since sponsored national conferences on both the East and West Coast. In 2007 Lerner launched a campaign for a "Global Marshall Plan".

== Views ==
=== Jewish Renewal movement ===
Lerner was associated with and promoted Jewish Renewal, having received his semikhah from the movement's founder, Rabbi Zalman Schachter-Shalomi. Jewish Renewal is a small Jewish religious movement that Lerner described as "positive Judaism", rejecting what he considered to be ethnocentric interpretations of the Torah.

Lerner's call for a spiritual transformation of American society was first articulated in Tikkun and then in his book The Politics of Meaning. Lerner developed his ideas further in his books Spirit Matters (2000) and The Left Hand of God (2006).

His publications promoted religious pluralism and progressive or liberal approaches to political problems and he attempted to build bridges with Christian, Buddhist and Muslim leaders around such issues.

=== Controversial views ===
Lerner described some of his views as "very controversial," particularly his views about building peace between Israel and Palestine. In 2003, the San Diego Jewish Journal described Lerner as "the most controversial Jew in America," writing that "He is relentlessly critical of Israel. He eulogizes Rachel Corrie. And he's done more for peace than any conservative we know."

In 1997, former Tikkun editors accused Lerner of publishing pseudonymous letters to the editor that he himself had written. While many of the letters were laudatory ("Your editorial stand on Iraq said publicly what many of us in the Israeli peace camp are feeling privately but dare not say."), a few were critical ("Have you gone off your rocker?"). Lerner admitted that he had fabricated the letters but said his only mistake was not informing readers that the authors' names were pseudonyms.

==== Criticism of leftist antisemitism ====
In 2003, Lerner criticized the left-wing anti-war ANSWER Coalition for the antisemitism that he and others believe is reflected in the rhetoric at ANSWER-sponsored demonstrations. He later claimed that because of his criticism, the ANSWER coalition—of which Lerner's Tikkun community was a member—barred him from speaking at their rallies against the 2003 invasion of Iraq.

In February 2007, Lerner published a column entitled "There Is No New Anti-Semitism," in which he criticized some American Jewish organizations for labeling critics of Israel as antisemites. He was especially critical of the Anti-Defamation League and the American Israel Public Affairs Committee, which he characterized as "Israel-can-do-no-wrong voices in American politics." Lerner wrote that this mentality, which frequently leads to accusations that Jews who oppose Israel's policies toward the Palestinians are "self-hating Jews," is alienating young Jews who "say that they can no longer identify with their Jewishness."

==== Israel ====
Lerner strongly objected to Israel's occupation of the West Bank. He supported the adoption of the 2003 Geneva Accords as a basis for an independent Palestinian state.

==== Good Friday Prayer for the Jews ====
Regarding the motu proprio Summorum Pontificum, which allowed the re-introduction of the Tridentine Mass and the related Good Friday Prayer for the Jews, he said that the Pope took "a powerful step toward the re-introduction of the process of demeaning Jews. You cannot respect another religion if you teach that those who are part of it must convert to your own religion."

==== Support of Judge Richard Goldstone ====
Lerner was one of a small group of Jewish leaders who supported Judge Richard Goldstone after Goldstone released his United Nations report that accused Israel and Hamas of war crimes and possible crimes against humanity during the winter 2009 Gaza War. After Tikkun magazine announced that it would award Goldstone with its Tikkun Award, Lerner's home was vandalized several times, with posters caricaturing him as a Nazi.

== Awards and honors ==
While at the Seminary, Lerner was elected national president of Atid, the college organization of the United Synagogue of America. Lerner was chosen by Utne Reader in 1995 as one of the world's "100 top visionaries" along with Václav Havel and Noam Chomsky. In 2005 Lerner received the Gandhi, King, Ikeda Community Builders Prize from Morehouse College in Atlanta in recognition of his work in forging a "progressive middle path that is both pro-Israel and pro-Palestine" in his book Healing Israel/Palestine and in his writing in Tikkun magazine. Tikkun magazine, which Lerner continues to edit, received from the mainstream media organization RNA The Religion Newswriters Association, the "Best Magazine of the Year" Award in both 2014 and 2015.

== Personal life, illness and death ==
Lerner was married to Theirrie Cook until divorcing; he was then married to Nan Fink until divorcing in 1991, to Debora Kohn from 1998 until divorcing in 2014, and then to Cat Zavis in 2015, from whom he had separated in 2024. Lerner and Cook had a son.

In February 2009 Lerner publicly announced he had been diagnosed with lung cancer, and mentioned this in many promotional mailings and published pieces. He underwent surgical treatment in March 2009, which was apparently successful.

Lerner died at his home in Berkeley on August 28, 2024, at the age of 81. He had congestive heart failure, and died through assisted suicide, as permitted by the California End of Life Option Act.

== Influence and legacy ==
During the period of the Seattle Seven, Lerner met several times with boxer Muhammad Ali, who was also active in the anti-war movement, at anti-war meetings organized by Lerner. Lerner recounts that Ali was the first practicing Muslim he had ever met. The two never met or spoke again after this period though in 1995 Lerner received a letter from Ali expressing appreciation for the book Lerner co-authored with Cornel West, Jews and Blacks: Let the Healing Begin. Muhammad Ali included an invitation to Lerner to speak at Ali's memorial, to represent progressive Jewish faith, which took place in 2016. Lerner also learned from Ali's lawyer that Ali had been a "big fan" of the rabbi's work and that Ali was really sorry that he had not made more contact with Lerner over the past two decades. Ali and his wife had intended to do so many times and just hadn't followed through.

== Bibliography ==
In 2024, Stanford University created an archive of Michael Lerner's work.

=== Books ===
- Lerner, Michael (1973). The New Socialist Revolution. New York : Delacorte Press. ISBN 978-0-440-06372-8.
- Lerner, Michael (1986). Surplus Powerlessness: The Psychodynamics of Everyday Life and the Psychology of Individual and Social Transformation. Institute for Labor & Mental Health. ISBN 978-0-935933-01-7.
- Lerner, Michael (1992). The Socialism of Fools: Anti-Semitism on the Left. Oakland: Institute for Labor & Mental Health. ISBN 978-0-935933-05-5.
- Lerner, Michael (1994). Jewish Renewal: A Path to Healing and Transformation. New York: Putnam Adult. ISBN 0-399-13980-X.
- Lerner, Michael; West, Cornel (1995). Jews and Blacks: Let the Healing Begin. New York: Putnam Adult. ISBN 0-399-14046-8.
- Lerner, Michael (1996). The Politics Of Meaning: Restoring Hope and Possibility in an Age of Cynicism. Addison-Wesley Longman. ISBN 978-0-201-47966-9.
- Lerner, Michael (2000). Spirit Matters: Global Healing and the Wisdom of the Soul. Charlottesville, Va: Walsch Books. ISBN 978-1-57174-195-0.
- Lerner, Michael (2003). Healing Israel/Palestine: A Path to Peace and Reconciliation. Berkeley, Calif: North Atlantic Books. ISBN 978-1-55643-484-6.
- Lerner, Michael (2004). The Geneva Accord: And Other Strategies for Healing the Israeli-Palestinian Conflict. Berkeley, Calif: North Atlantic Books. ISBN 1-55643-537-1.
- Lerner, Michael (2006). The Left Hand of God: Taking Back Our Country from the Religious Right. San Francisco: Harper Collins. ISBN 978-0-06-084247-5. OCLC 61211456.

=== Anthologies ===
- Tikkun: To Heal, Repair, and Transform the World (1992) – edited by Michael Lerner
- Best Contemporary Jewish Writing (2001) – edited by Michael Lerner
- Best Jewish Writing 2002 (2002) – edited by Michael Lerner
- Tikkun Reader: Twentieth Anniversary (2006) – edited by Michael Lerner
