= George Vradenburg =

American attorney (born 1943)

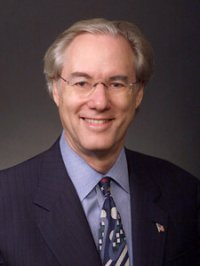
- Born: 1943; Kinston, North Carolina, United States
- Occupation: Businessman

George Vradenburg (born 1943) is an American attorney, who has been chief counsel at America Online Inc. and CBS Inc., and senior executive at AOL Time Warner and Fox Broadcasting Company. He is co-founder and chairman of USAgainstAlzheimer's (USA2), an Alzheimer's advocacy organization., and co-publisher of Tikkun, an English-language magazine with a progressive viewpoint.

== Education ==
Vradenburg was born in Kinston, North Carolina but grew up in Colorado Springs, Colorado, and graduated from Colorado Springs High School. Vradenburg received his B.A. from Oberlin College magna cum laude, where he was elected to Phi Beta Kappa, and his J.D. cum laude from Harvard Law School.

== Professional career ==
Vrandenberg was a senior partner in the Los Angeles office of Latham & Watkins and as co-chair of its Entertainment & Media Industry Practice Group.

He served CBS Inc. as senior vice president and general counsel at CBS, Vradenburg was general counsel during the legal defense in the Gen. William Westmoreland case and the attempted hostile takeovers by Ted Turner and Jesse Helms. He was executive vice president of Fox Broadcasting Company.

He joined America Online as senior vice president and general counsel in early 1997 and in 1999 was named senior vice president for global and strategic policy. In January 2001, he was named executive vice president for global and strategic policy for AOL Time Warner.

== Tikkun ==
Since 2000, Trish and George Vradenburg have been co-publishers of Tikkun, a bi-monthly English-language magazine that analyzes American and Israeli culture, politics, religion and history from a leftist-progressive viewpoint, and provides commentary about Israeli politics and Jewish life in North America.

== Alzheimer's advocacy ==
In 2004, George and his late wife, [Trish Vradenburg], launched the National Alzheimer's Gala, and from 2004 through 2011 co-chaired that Gala, raising over $10 million to support the mission of the Alzheimer's Association. In 2006, he helped launch the Alzheimer's Study Group which in 2009 recommended a national strategic plan to address the disease. In 2011, he was appointed a member of the Advisory Council on Research, Care and Services established under the National Alzheimer's Project Act.

In 2006, the Vradenburgs established the USAgainstAlzheimer's Political Action Committee, and in 2010, they established US Against Alzheimer's (USA2), an independent non-profit organization whose mission is to stop Alzheimer's disease by 2020. He has been quoted extensively about Alzheimer's in the national press.

== Philanthropy ==
In 2001, George and Trish Vradenburg founded the Vradenburg Foundation, whose mission is to address education, charitable, scientific and social issues around the world. He also established the Bee Vradenburg Foundation in Colorado Springs, CO, to support the performing arts in the Pikes Peak Region in honor of his mother. In 2003, he was appointed chairman of the board of Trustees of The Phillips Collection, in Washington DC.

He also served on the board of the Survivors Fund, which was established to get victims of 9/11 back on their feet. In 2003, he was appointed to the Private Sector Advisory Committee of the Homeland Security Advisory Council to the Department of Homeland Security.

In 2008 he co-founded the Chesapeake Crescent Initiative, aiming to foster innovation in the Chesapeake Region.

From 2007 through 2009 he chaired the DC Education Compact and from 2007 through 2010 served on the board of the Washington Scholarship Fund. In 2011 he became a member of the board of trustees of the University of the District of Columbia.
