= Chip Marshall =

American activist

Charles Clark "Chip" Marshall III is a political activist, and was a member of the prominent anti-Vietnam War group, the Seattle Liberation Front ("Seattle Seven"), defending himself in the trial pro se. He ran for Seattle City Council in 1975 and 1977, but was unsuccessful. Since then, he helped to develop Issaquah's Klahanie community.

According to The Seattle Times, he has retired to Malta, after a real estate career with Merrill Gardens China.
