= Jeff Dowd =

American film producer

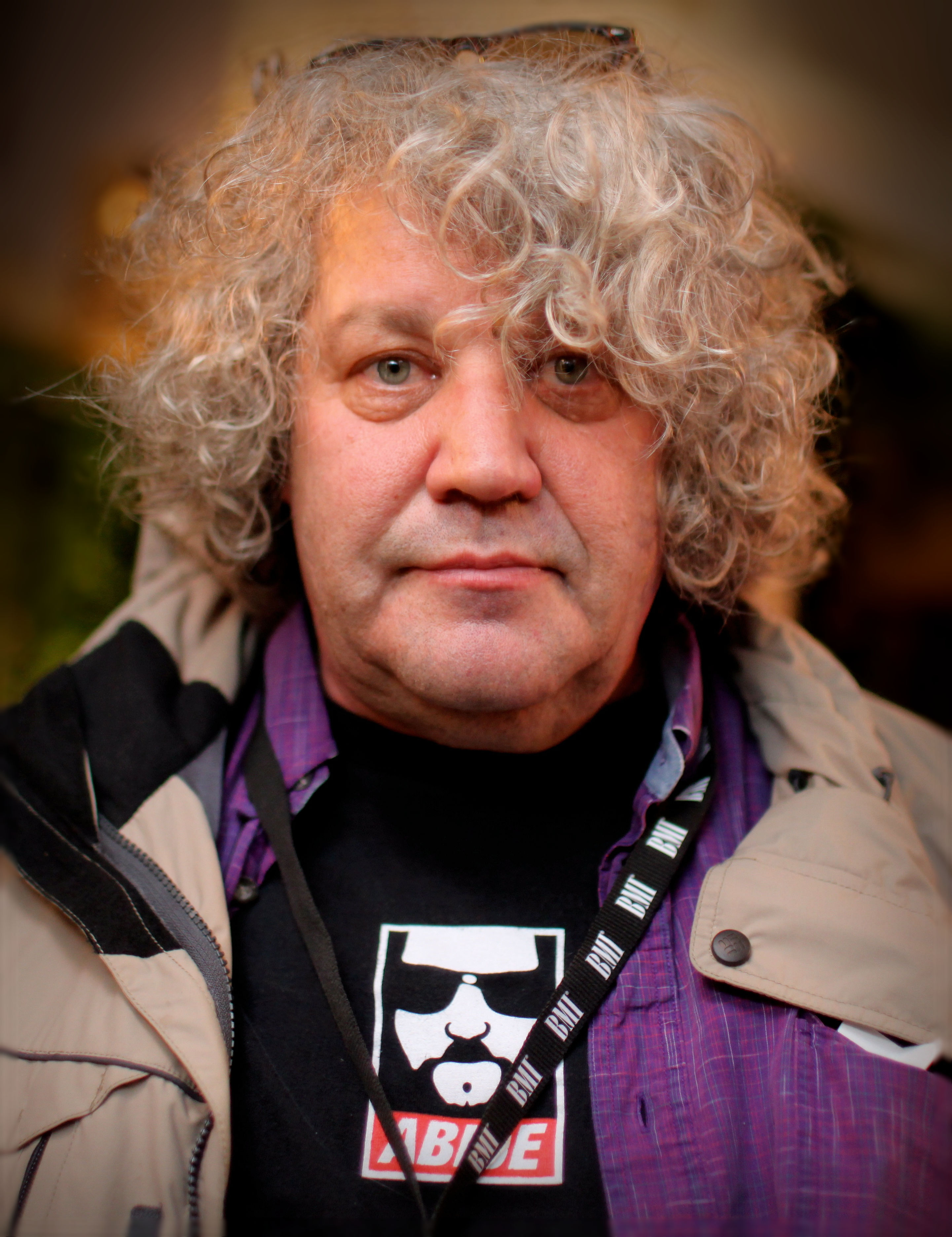
- Dowd in 2009
- Born: November 20, 1949 (age 76); United States
- Occupation: Film producer
- Relatives: Paul Sweezy (stepfather)

Jeff Dowd (born November 20, 1949) is an American film producer and political activist.

== Biography ==
He was a member of the "Seattle Seven", who were jailed for contempt of court following a violent protest against the Vietnam War. He later moved to Los Angeles and became an independent movie producer and promoter, producing such films as Zebrahead. He met the Coen brothers while they were promoting their first film, Blood Simple, and was a key (though not the only) inspiration for their character Jeffrey "The Dude" Lebowski from The Big Lebowski.

Circa 1978, Dowd was involved, with Robert Redford, in the early planning stages of the Sundance Film Festival and the Sundance Institute and has served on the advisory board for both organizations.

In 2009, Dowd was involved in an altercation with movie critic John Anderson at the 25th Sundance Film Festival, after Anderson panned Dirt! The Movie (Dowd was the film's sales agent). Anderson was eating breakfast when Dowd reportedly confronted him, and then incited a food fight and brief melee at the Yarrow Hotel Restaurant. Dowd did not press charges.

In 2011, Dowd was the subject of an 18-minute documentary-short directed by Jeff Feuerzeig and broadcast on the USA Network as part of its "Character" series.

He has been a supporter of PeaceJam, a child mentoring organization, and the presidential campaigns of Bernie Sanders.

== Filmography ==
- FernGully: The Last Rainforest (1992) (co-executive producer)
- Zebrahead (1992) (producer)
- Cement (1999) (co-executive producer)
- The Last Game (2002) (TV) (executive producer)
- Ocean of Pearls (2008) (executive producer)
