= Network of Spiritual Progressives =

- Type: Non-profit / NGO
- Fields: money in politics, global poverty, peace in the middle east
- Key people: Rabbi Michael Lerner; Sister Joan Chittister; Cornel West
- Website: http://spiritualprogressives.org/

The Network of Spiritual Progressives (NSP) is an international political and social justice movement based in the United States that seeks to influence American politics towards more humane, progressive values. The organization also challenges what it perceives as the misuse of religion by political conservatives and the anti-religious attitudes of many liberals. In the international sphere, the NSP seeks to foster inter-religious understanding and work for social justice.

The NSP was founded in 2005 by Rabbi Michael Lerner, who served as co-director of the organization with Cornel West and Sister Joan Chittister. Michael Lerner's widow, Cat Zavis, is the current executive director. More than 1,200 activists attended each of the group's conferences in Berkeley, California (July 2005) and Washington, D.C. (May 2006).

As of December 2007, the NSP had chapters in 31 states as well as Toronto, Ontario, Canada; Melbourne, Australia; and in Costa Rica.

== Basic tenets ==
The Network of Spiritual Progressives was founded based on three basic tenets:

- Changing the bottom line in America.
- Challenging the misuse of religion, God and spirit by the Religious Right.
- Challenging the many anti-religious and anti-spiritual assumptions and behaviors that have increasingly become part of the liberal culture.

== See also ==
- Interreligious organisation
- Engaged Spirituality
