= GA 300 =

GA300, GA 300, or GA-300 may refer to:

- Georgia 300, a private railroad car
- Georgia State Route 300, a highway that runs through Thomas, Mitchell, Dougherty, Worth, and Crisp counties in the state of Georgia
  - Georgia State Route 300 (1960–1983), a former highway that ran through Jasper and Putnam counties in the state of Georgia

== See also ==
- 2016 GA300, a minor planet
