= First inauguration of Barack Obama =

56th United States presidential inauguration

First presidential inauguration of Barack Obama
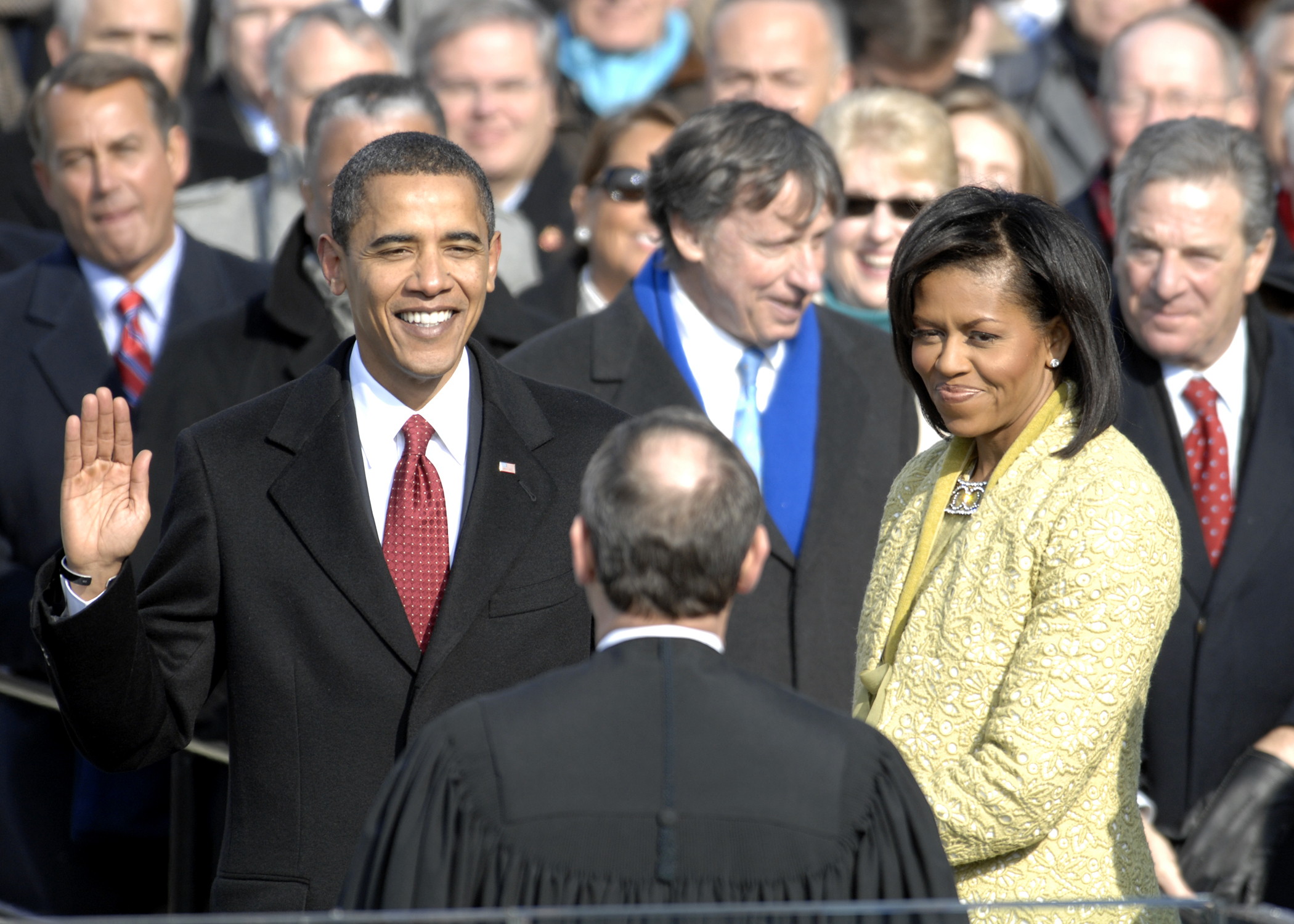
- Barack Obama takes the oath of office as the 44th president of the United States.
- Date: January 20, 2009; 17 years ago
- Location: United States Capitol, Washington, D.C.
- Organized by: Joint Congressional Committee on Inaugural Ceremonies
- Participants: Barack Obama; 44th president of the United States — Assuming office John Roberts; Chief Justice of the United States — Administering oath Joe Biden; 47th vice president of the United States — Assuming office John Paul Stevens; Associate Justice of the Supreme Court of the United States — Administering oath

The first inauguration of Barack Obama as the 44th president of the United States took place on Tuesday, January 20, 2009, at the West Front of the United States Capitol in Washington, D.C. The 56th inauguration, which set a record attendance for any event held in the city, marked the commencement of the first term of Barack Obama as president and Joe Biden as vice president. Based on combined attendance numbers, television viewership, and Internet traffic, it was the most viewed inauguration since that of Ronald Reagan in 1981.

"A New Birth of Freedom", a phrase from the Gettysburg Address, served as the inaugural theme to commemorate the 200-year anniversary of the birth year of President Abraham Lincoln. In his speeches to the crowds, Obama referred to ideals expressed by Lincoln about renewal, continuity, and national unity. Obama mentioned these ideals in his speech to stress the need for shared sacrifice and a new sense of responsibility to answer America's challenges at home and abroad.

Obama and others paid homage to Lincoln in the form of tributes and references during several events, starting with a commemorative train tour from Philadelphia, Pennsylvania, to Washington, D.C., on January 17, 2009. The inaugural events held in Washington from January 18 to 21, 2009, included concerts, a national day of community service on Martin Luther King Jr. Day, the swearing-in ceremony, luncheon and parade, inaugural balls, and the interfaith inaugural prayer service. The presidential oath as administered by Supreme Court Chief Justice John Roberts to Obama during his swearing-in ceremony on January 20 strayed slightly from the oath of office prescribed in the United States Constitution, which led to its re‑administration the next day.

In addition to a larger than usual celebrity attendance, the Presidential Inaugural Committee increased its outreach to ordinary citizens to encourage greater participation in inaugural events compared with participation in recent past inaugurations. For the first time, the committee opened the entire length of the National Mall as the public viewing area for the swearing-in ceremony, breaking with the tradition of past inaugurations. Selected American citizens participated in the train tour and other inaugural events. A philanthropist organized a People's Inaugural Ball for disadvantaged people who otherwise could not afford to attend the inaugural festivities. Among the celebrations for the inauguration, the committee hosted a first-ever Neighborhood Inaugural Ball with free or affordable tickets for ordinary citizens.

== Context ==
By definition, the inauguration marked the formal culmination of the presidential transition of Barack Obama that began when he won the United States presidential election on November 4, 2008, and became the president-elect. In accordance with Article I, Section 6 of the United States Constitution, Obama resigned from the United States Senate effective November 16, 2008. He was formally elected by the Electoral College on December 15, 2008. The results were certified by a joint session of Congress on January 8, 2009.

Obama, who originally campaigned using the slogan "Change We Can Believe In" and later "Change We Need", was widely celebrated as the first African American president of the United States and a symbol of change from his Republican predecessor, George W. Bush. Obama also represented a generational change as the first man elected president who was born in the 1960s. He inherited the 2008 financial crisis, which Peter Orszag termed an "economic mess".

== Planning ==
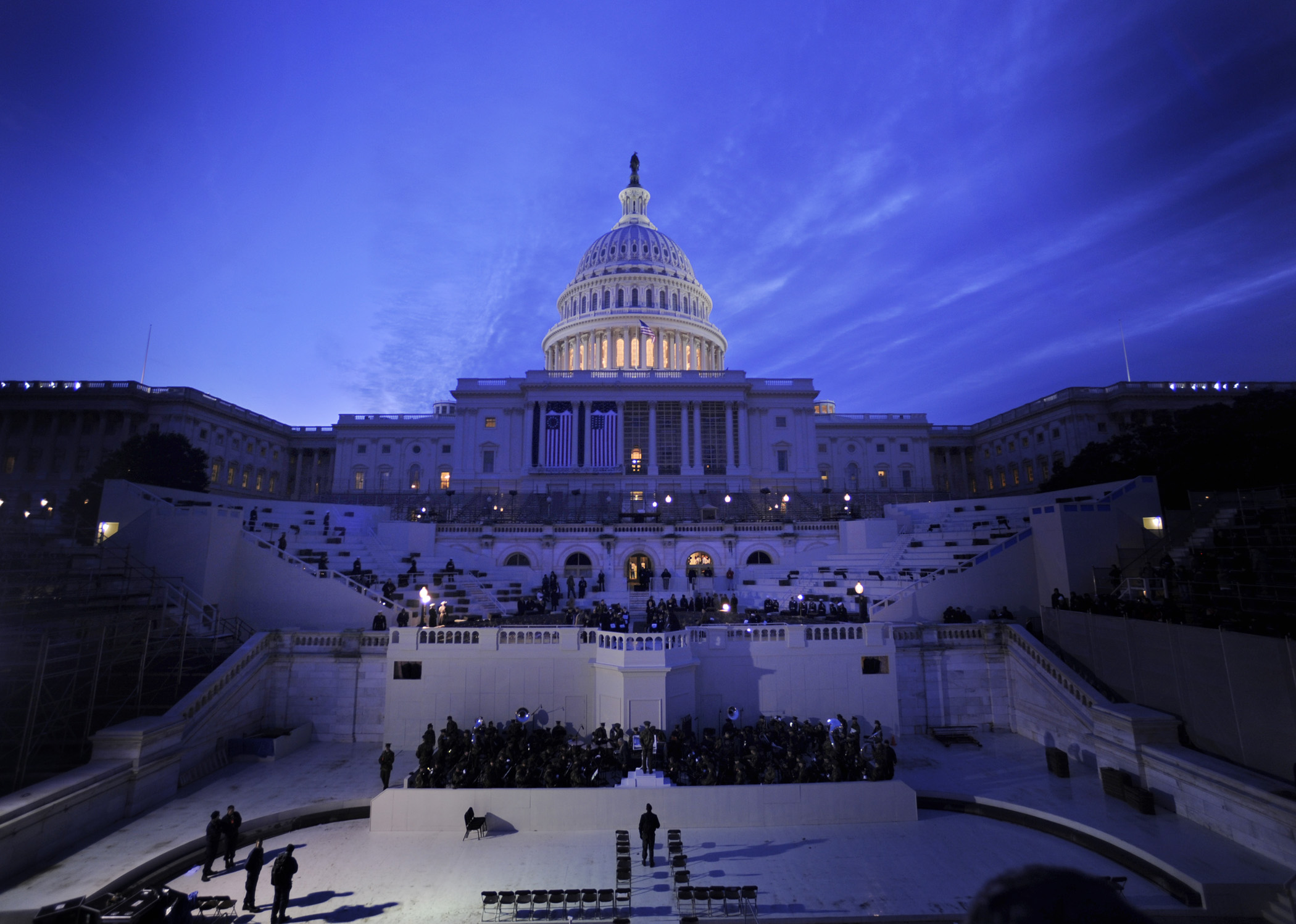
Preparations at the United States Capitol

The inauguration was planned primarily by two committees: the Joint Congressional Committee on Inaugural Ceremonies and the 2009 Presidential Inaugural Committee. Although the election was scheduled for November 4, 2008, the congressional committee began constructing the inaugural platform on September 24, 2008.

=== Joint Congressional Committee ===
The swearing-in ceremony and the inaugural luncheon for President-elect Obama and Vice President-elect Biden were planned by the Joint Congressional Committee on Inaugural Ceremonies, a committee composed of United States Senators Dianne Feinstein, committee chair, Bob Bennett and Harry Reid, and United States Representatives John Boehner, Steny Hoyer and Nancy Pelosi. The committee is overseen by the U.S. Senate Committee on Rules and Administration.

The Joint Congressional Committee on Inaugural Ceremonies chose the inaugural theme, "A New Birth of Freedom", a phrase from Abraham Lincoln's Gettysburg Address from the Civil War era. The theme, which was selected by the committee to mark the inaugural occasion and honor the 200th anniversary year of Lincoln's birth, expressed "Lincoln's hope that the sacrifice of those who died to preserve the United States would lead to 'a new birth of freedom' for the nation." In his reliance on the inaugural theme, Obama wanted "to give Americans reassurance that today, as in Lincoln's time, the country would find its way through any crisis".

The congressional committee released the full schedule of the January 20 inaugural events on December 17, 2008. The inauguration schedule referred to the president‑elect as "Barack H. Obama", although Obama specified previously that he intended to use his full name for his swearing-in ceremony, including his middle name Hussein. Obama decided to use his full name "Barack Hussein Obama" to "follow the tradition, not trying to make a statement one way or the other" for the inaugural ceremony. During the election campaign, Obama's detractors tried to use his middle name to imply falsely that he was a Muslim.

The District of Columbia City Council passed legislation to enable bars and restaurants to stay open around‑the‑clock to provide hospitality services to the inaugural festivities attendees. After reaching an agreement with the congressional committee, District of Columbia Mayor Adrian Fenty signed legislation to temporarily allow bars and restaurants to operate 24 hours during the weekend leading up to the inauguration, but with 4:00 am EST as the cut‑off for alcoholic beverage service. The Hotel Association of Metropolitan Washington agreed to pay for extended train service provided by the Washington Metropolitan Area Transit Authority on January 19 to accommodate visitors attending inaugural events and workers providing support for those events.

=== Presidential Inaugural Committee ===
The 2009 Presidential Inaugural Committee organized several other inauguration‑related events at the direction of the president‑elect and vice president‑elect of the United States, such as the train ride, concerts, parade, balls and prayer service. The co-chairs of the committee were William Daley, Penny Pritzker, John W. Rogers Jr., Patrick Ryan and Julianna Smoot.

For the first time in history, the Presidential Inaugural Committee opened the full length of National Mall, which extends from the United States Capitol to the Lincoln Memorial, as the public viewing area for the swearing-in ceremony. The presidential committee set aside a section of the mall close to the U.S. Capitol for people holding reserved tickets for the inaugural event. The committee directed the opening of the entire National Mall to make the event "'the most open and accessible in history,' allowing those who [could not] get the [reserved] tickets to the swearing-in ceremony on the Capitol grounds to fill the mall". To enable people in attendance to see and hear the swearing-in ceremony, the committee arranged for placement of JumboTrons at points along the entire mall.

Despite criticism that such a large event could not be carbon-friendly, the presidential committee incorporated environment-friendly measures in its planning of the inaugural events. The environmental measures included the use of recyclable carpet for the platform, retrieval of recyclable items from outdoor areas after an event, and the use of recycled paper for invitations and inaugural ball tickets.

==== Fundraising ====
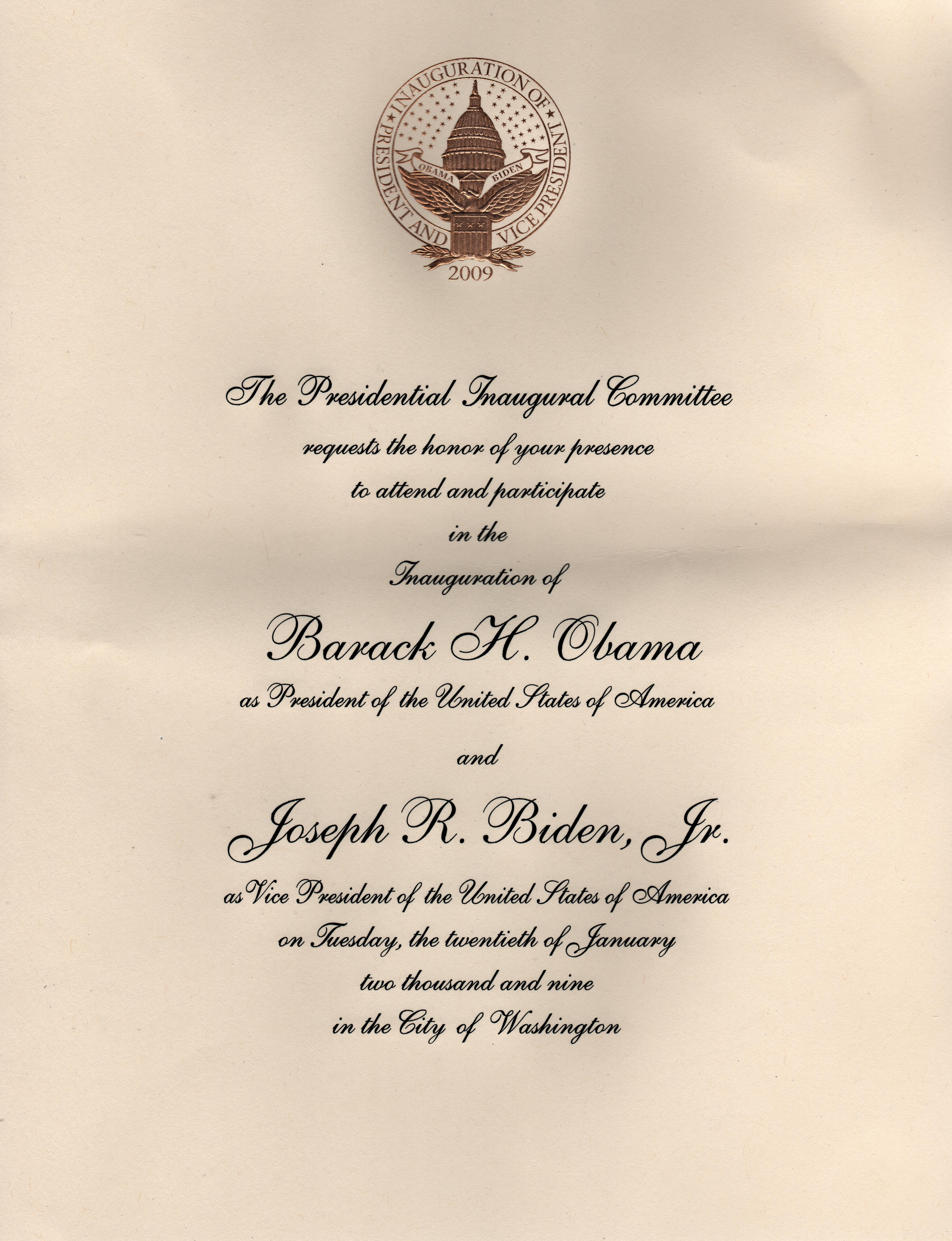
One of the one million public invitations to the inaugural ceremony of Barack Obama

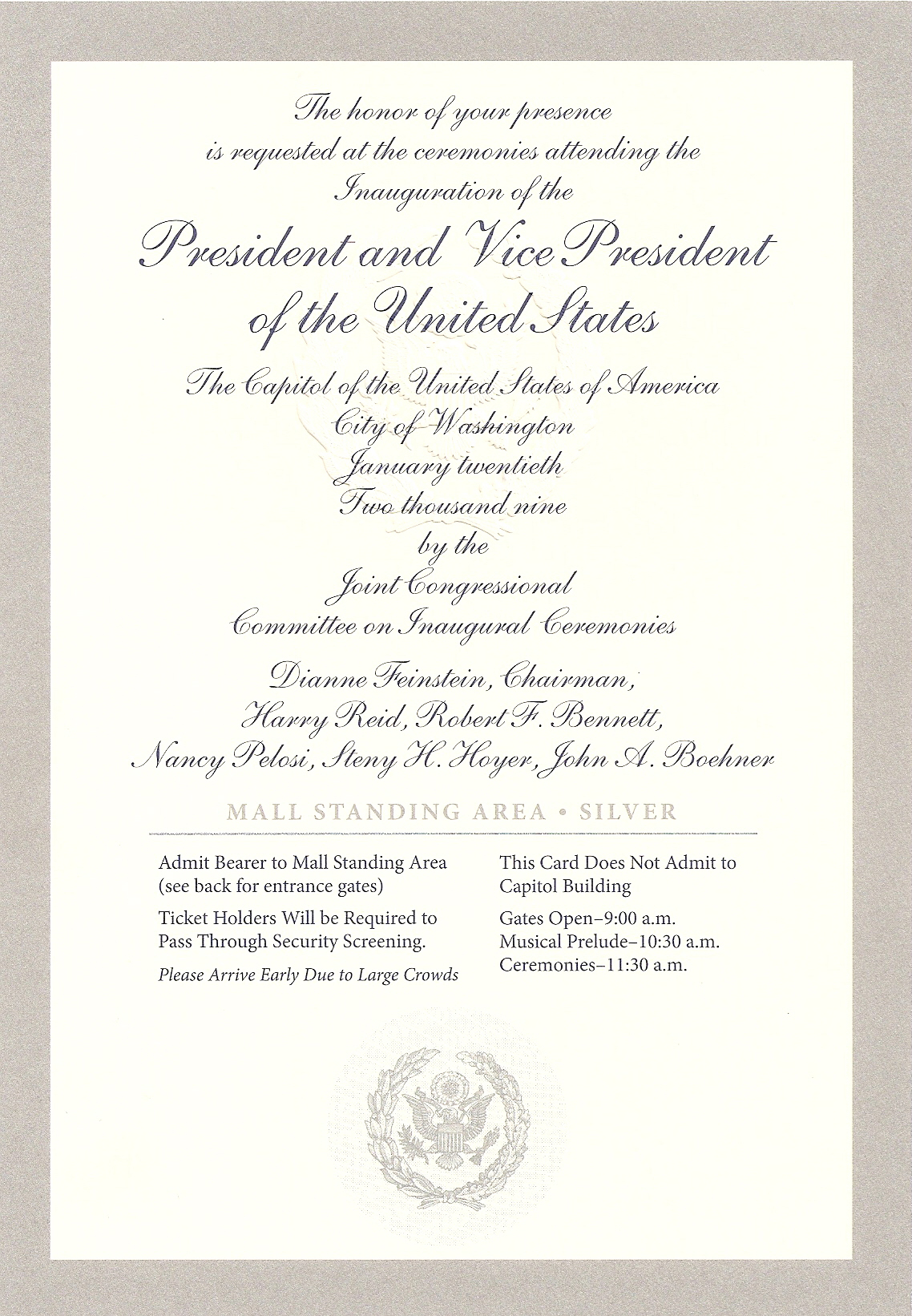
One of the color-coded tickets issued by members of the 111th U.S. Congress

The 2009 Presidential Inaugural Committee attempted to raise more individual contributions in smaller dollar amounts compared with the second inauguration of George W. Bush in 2005. The 2009 contribution limit was set at $50,000 for donations by individuals, whereas individuals and companies were able to give a maximum of $250,000 apiece for the 2005 event. As of January 30, 2009, the presidential committee raised more than $53 million, with at least 458 people giving the committee-imposed maximum of $50,000, including celebrity donors such as George Soros, Halle Berry, Jamie Foxx and George Lucas. Emphasizing a change from business as usual, the committee set stringent guidelines for campaign contributions, barring donations from corporations, political action committees, registered federal lobbyists, labor and trade unions, registered foreign agents and non-U.S. citizens. The committee did accept donations from people with active lobbying interests before the federal government, but not registered as federal lobbyists, such as Google executive Eric Schmidt and Microsoft executive Steve Ballmer.

Based on its fundraising efforts and crowd estimates for the Obama inauguration, the presidential committee set its budget at $160–$170 million for the inauguration, including about $45 million for the gala events. The federal government contributed about $49 million, including $1.2 million to cover the actual swearing-in ceremony. The District of Columbia and the neighboring states of Maryland and Virginia projected costs to provide support for inaugural events at more than $75 million alone for police, fire and medical services. To help fund the efforts, President George W. Bush declared a federal state of emergency as a precaution so that funds could be sought from Federal Emergency Management Agency.

=== Invitations and tickets ===
The Presidential Inaugural Committee and members of the 111th U.S. Congress distributed invitations and color-coded tickets to both dignitaries and ordinary citizens for the reserved sections on or near the U.S. Capitol grounds to view the swearing-in ceremony. Invitations and tickets were sent to ambassadors and chiefs of diplomatic missions to the United States and their spouses, but not to other representatives of foreign countries, and invitations were distributed to U.S. politicians and an array of dignitaries across the spectrum of business and industry. House and Senate congressional members distributed free tickets for the inaugural ceremony to the public by lottery or on a first‑come, first served basis because of overwhelming requests to attend the event.

Because of high demand and limited availability of the reserved tickets, some people planned to offer their tickets for sale through ticket brokers, Internet auctions and classified listing services. Sales offers for tickets reached as high as $1,750 each for the reserved standing room section behind the Capitol Reflecting Pool, $5,500 each for the reserved standing room section in front of the Reflecting Pool and $20,000 each for the VIP section on the Capitol grounds. In one case, a former legislative aide to Representative Ted Poe was exposed by a prospective buyer after the former aide used Craigslist and e‑mail to offer five tickets to the buyer for $4,500.

Federal and state officials became concerned about ticket scalping and fraud related to sales of the tickets for the swearing-in ceremony. Senator Dianne Feinstein, chair of the Joint Congressional Committee on Inaugural Ceremonies, introduced legislation in mid-November 2008 to ban sales of tickets to the swearing-in ceremony. At the same time, the joint congressional committee contacted online auction operators, ticket resellers and classified listing services to block sales of the tickets. To address the committee's concerns, StubHub and eBay agreed to ban ticket sales for the swearing-in ceremony on all of its sites. Senator Feinstein re-introduced legislation in December 2008 to ban ticket sales for the swearing-in ceremony after amending the bill to exempt tickets issued by official presidential inaugural committees for inaugural event fundraising. The U.S. Senate failed to pass the final bill, which caused the bill to die in the closing days of the lame duck legislative session.

== Pre-inaugural events ==
=== Train ride: Commemorating Lincoln ===
On January 17, 2009, Obama hosted a whistle stop train tour in honor of the 200th anniversary of the birth year of Abraham Lincoln. Obama reenacted the final part of Lincoln's 1861 train tour from Philadelphia, Pennsylvania, to Washington, D.C. to capture the mood of the 1861 Springfield to Washington train tour traveled by Lincoln to his own inauguration. For his train ride to the nation's capital, Obama rode in the Georgia 300, a vintage railroad car used by past presidents and the same one he used for touring Pennsylvania during his presidential primary campaign. On the tour, Obama was accompanied by his wife Michelle, who had just turned forty-five on this day, their daughters Malia and Sasha, and a host of friends and guests.

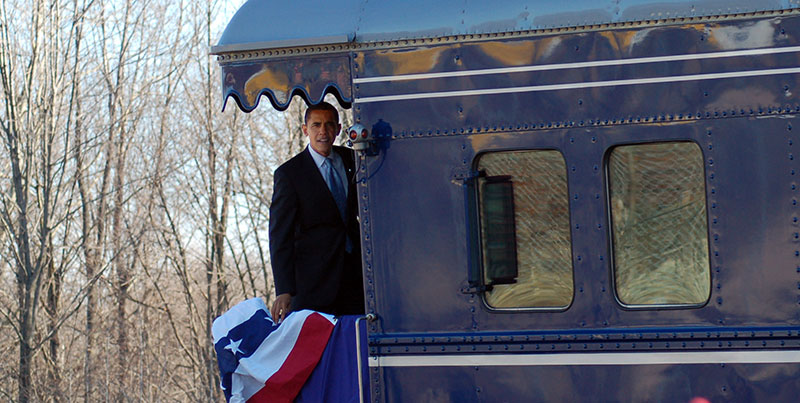
Obama aboard the Georgia 300 on January 17, 2009

For the train ride to Washington, Obama invited 41 "everyday Americans" that he met during his presidential campaign to accompany him on the tour and attend other inaugural events, including the swearing-in ceremony, the parade and an inaugural ball. The group of citizens who joined the tour had shared stories with then-candidate Obama about themselves and their families during the presidential campaign, and included Matt Kuntz and Lilly Ledbetter. Kuntz, who lost his step‑brother to suicide after returning home from the Gulf War, dedicated his efforts to improve mental health screening for Iraq War veterans. Ledbetter, who learned years later that her employer had discriminated against her in pay based on gender, lost her case before the Supreme Court because she did not file her claim within 180 days of the discriminatory act. Nine days after his inauguration, Obama as president signed into law the Lilly Ledbetter Fair Pay Act, allowing claims filed against employers not only within 180 days of the pay discrimination, but also restarting the 180-day period for claims upon receiving any paycheck based on a discriminatory pay action.

Obama commenced the tour in Philadelphia by holding a town hall meeting at 30th Street Station with a few hundred supporters. At the first stop in Wilmington, Delaware Vice President‑elect Biden and his family joined the tour. Biden, dubbed "Amtrak Joe" for his daily commutes on Amtrak between Wilmington and Washington, built a reputation as a supporter of increased funding for U.S. commuter rail transportation. The train continued to Baltimore, Maryland, its second stop, where Obama spoke to a crowd of about 40,000 people.

During his speeches to the crowds, he emphasized the theme "A New Birth of Freedom" using phrases associated with Lincoln such as "better angels" and "a new declaration of independence". Obama referred to patriotic forebearers in his speech when he reminded the crowds that "we should never forget that we are the heirs of that first band of patriots, ordinary men and women who refused to give up when it all seemed so improbable; and who somehow believed that they had the power to make the world anew." Thousands of well‑wishers gathered at various points along the train route taking pictures, cheering and waving American flags and homemade signs, with Obama reciting his trademark rejoinder "I love you back" to the enthusiastic crowds. The one-day train tour concluded at Union Station in Washington, D.C.

=== We Are One concert ===
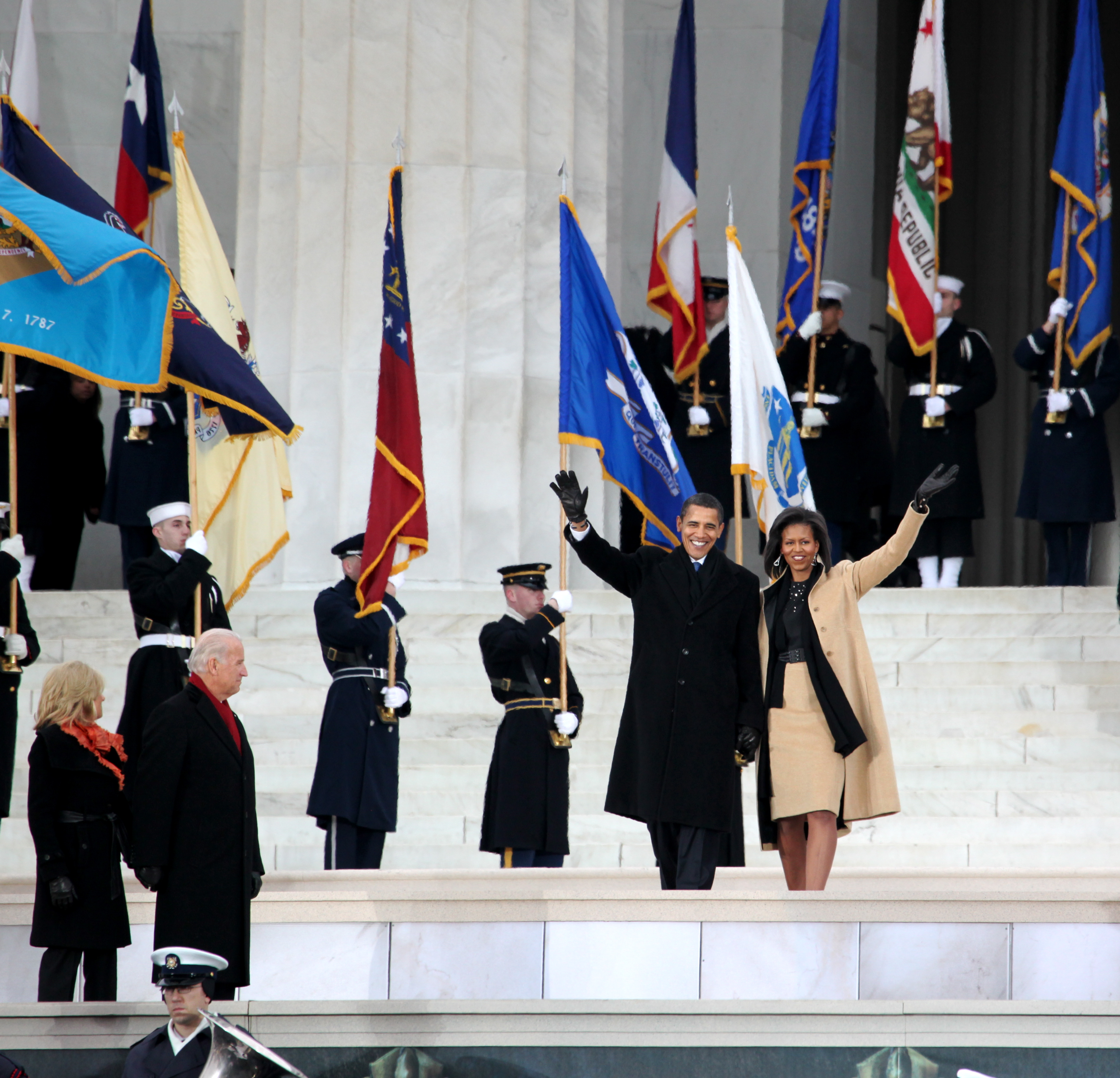
The Obamas wave at the crowd at the We Are One concert held at the Lincoln Memorial on January 18, 2009.

On January 18, 2009, the day after Obama arrived in Washington, D.C., an inaugural concert, "We Are One", took place at the Lincoln Memorial. The concert featured performances and readings of historical passages by more than three dozen celebrities. Attendance at the concert was free to the public, and HBO broadcast the concert live on an open feed, enabling anyone with cable television to watch the event. An estimated 400,000 people attended the concert at the Lincoln Memorial. The Washington Metro recorded 616,324 passenger trips during the day, breaking the old Sunday ridership record of 540,945 passenger trips set on July 4, 1999.

=== King Day of Service ===
The eve of the Inauguration Day, January 19, 2009, fell on Martin Luther King Jr. Day, a U.S. federal holiday in recognition of Dr. King's birthday. Obama called upon communities everywhere to observe the King Day of Service, a day of citizen volunteer service honoring the human rights leader. More than 13,000 community service events took place across the nation on the day, the largest participation in the 14 years since Congress passed the King Holiday and Service Act and more than double the previous year's events.

Obama spent an hour at Walter Reed Army Medical Center meeting privately with the families of troops who were recovering from wounds sustained in the Iraq War and the War in Afghanistan. After visiting the medical center, he, along with Martin Luther King, III, headed to the Sasha Bruce House homeless shelter for teens to participate with others in service activities.

Joe Biden hung drywall at a Habitat for Humanity home in N.E. Washington, D.C. Biden's wife, Jill, their daughter, Ashley Biden, Michelle Obama and the Obamas' daughters, Malia and Sasha, spent the morning at Robert F. Kennedy Stadium where they helped thousands of volunteers prepare more than 85,000 care packages destined for U.S. troops overseas. Later that evening, Obama hosted three separate bipartisan dinners to honor the service of John McCain, Colin Powell and Joe Biden.

=== Kids' Inaugural: "We Are the Future" ===
Michelle Obama and Jill Biden hosted the "Kids' Inaugural: We Are the Future" on the evening of January 19, 2009, event at the Verizon Center. Miley Cyrus, Demi Lovato, and the Jonas Brothers honored military families in concert. The show was broadcast live on the Disney Channel and on Radio Disney. Other celebrity participants included Bow Wow, George Lopez, Corbin Bleu, Queen Latifah, Billy Ray Cyrus, Shaquille O'Neal and Jamie Foxx. In keeping with the service theme of the day, Michelle Obama issued a call for children to become engaged in public service by volunteering in homeless shelters, visiting elderly people or writing letters to U.S. troops.

The Washington Metro recorded 866,681 passenger trips on January 19, breaking the single day ridership record of 854,638 passenger trips set on July 11, 2008.

== Inaugural events ==
=== Ceremony: "A New Birth of Freedom" ===
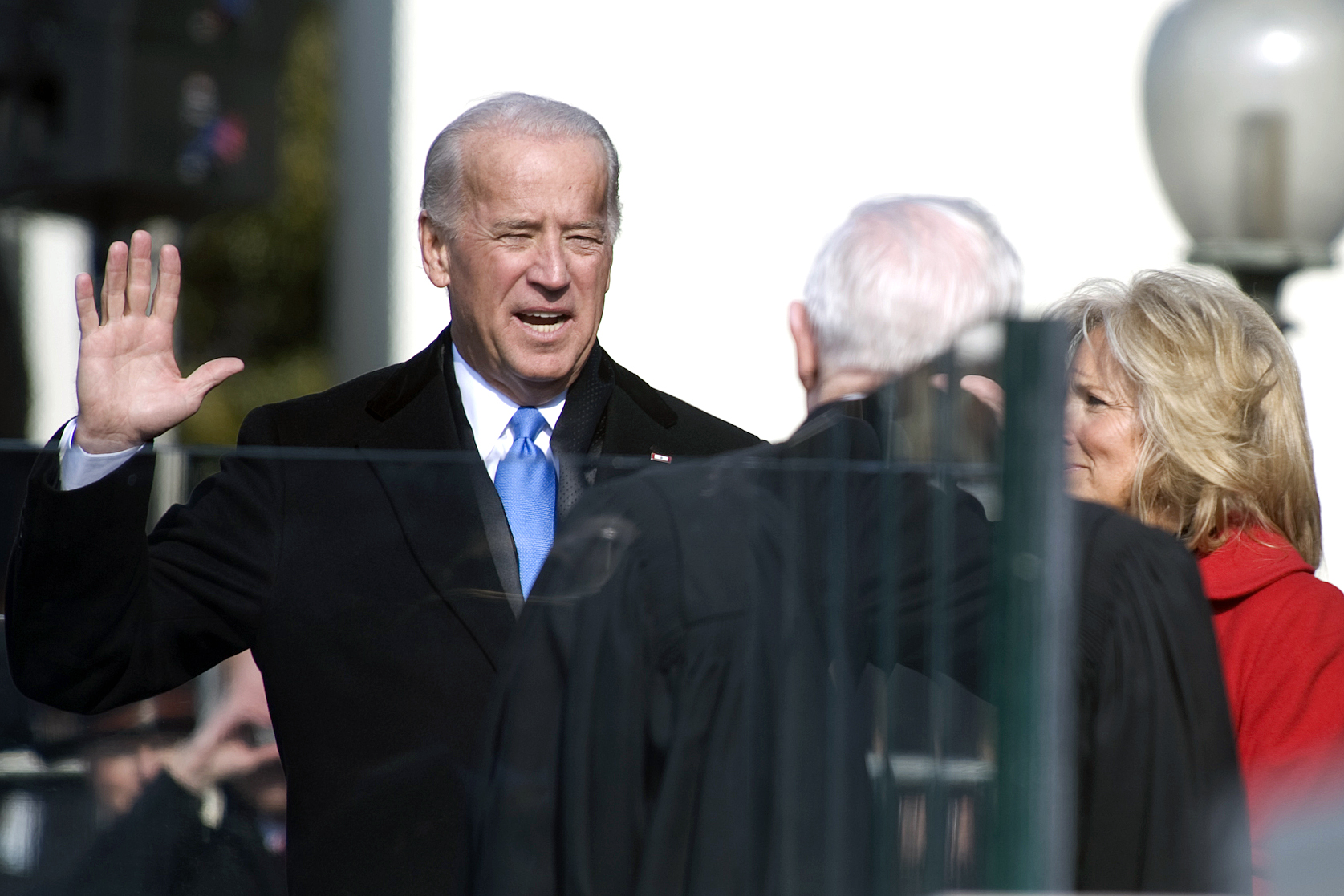
Biden was sworn into office by Associate Justice John Paul Stevens on January 20, 2009.

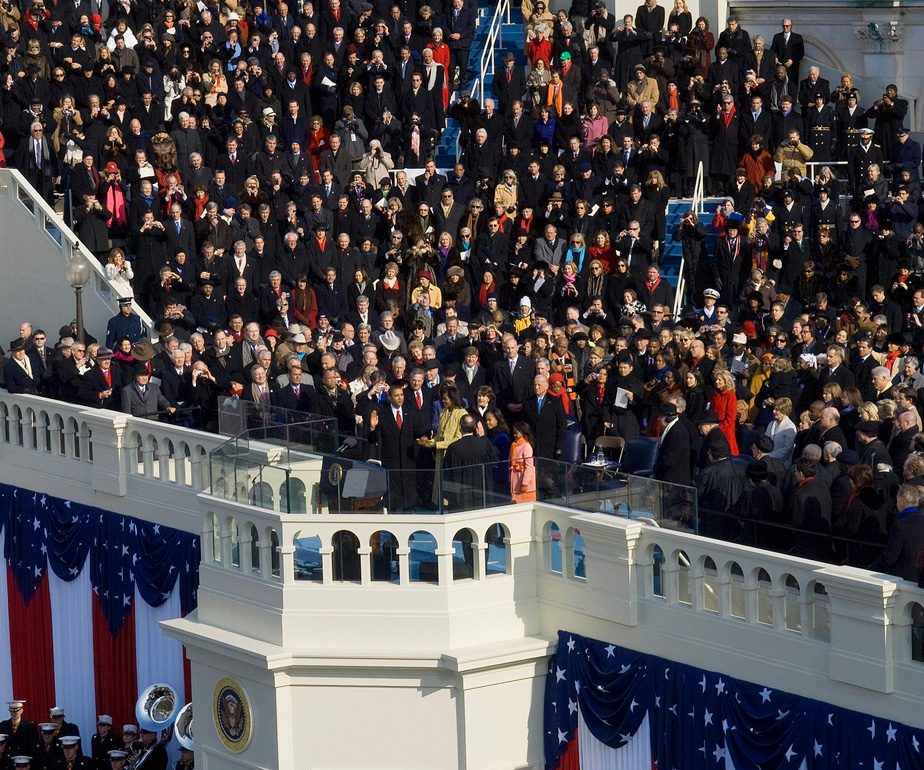
Obama takes the oath of office on January 20, 2009, at the U.S. Capitol.

The inaugural ceremony took place at the West Front of the United States Capitol on January 20, 2009. The weather was cold and blustery: at 12:00 pm at Ronald Reagan Washington National Airport, located 3.1 miles (5.0 km) from the Capitol, the temperature was 28 °F (−2 °C), with wind gusts of 23 mph (37 km/h). The ceremony opened with the playing of pre‑recorded music and a live performance by "The President's Own" United States Marine Band, followed by live performances by the San Francisco Boys Chorus and San Francisco Girls Chorus. Courtney Williams, Senior Chief Musician and concert moderator for the U.S. Navy Concert Band, served as the platform announcer. Senator Dianne Feinstein, chair of the Joint Congressional Committee on Inaugural Ceremonies and the first woman to preside over a U.S. presidential inauguration, acted as the day's Master of Ceremonies.

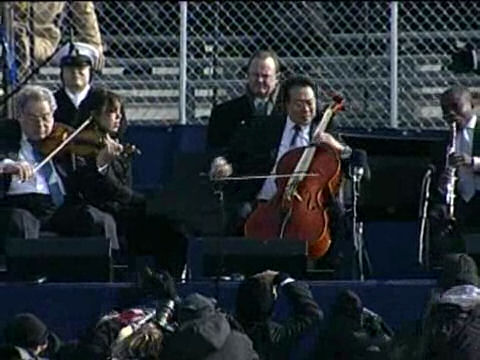
From left to right: Itzhak Perlman, Gabriela Montero, Yo-Yo Ma and Anthony McGill performing John Williams' "Air and Simple Gifts" at the inauguration. Obama officially became the 44th president at noon during this performance.

Evangelical pastor Rick Warren delivered the invocation for the inaugural ceremony, followed by a performance by vocalist Aretha Franklin, who sang "My Country, 'Tis of Thee". The program featured a performance of John Williams' composition "Air and Simple Gifts", which was both pre-recorded and performed live synched with the recording by cellist Yo-Yo Ma, violinist Itzhak Perlman, pianist Gabriela Montero and clarinetist Anthony McGill. National Public Radio described the performance by the quartet as "a transporting moment that moved many with its beauty and calm", while The New York Times called it the "classical-music equivalent of lip-syncing". Aretha Franklin made a fashion statement by wearing a hat with a distinctive Swarovski crystal-studded bow.

Vice President‑elect Biden took his oath from Associate Justice John Paul Stevens. After he completed his oath of office, Biden received in his honor as the new vice president the first playing of four ruffles and flourishes and the march "Hail, Columbia" by members of the armed forces. After the performance of "Air and Simple Gifts", Chief Justice John Roberts administered the oath of office to President‑elect Obama shortly after noon. The inaugural ceremony ran longer than scheduled, which delayed the administering of the oath so that it finished around 12:05 pm EST (17:05 UTC). However, Obama officially assumed the presidency at the expiration of President Bush's term at noon under the Twentieth Amendment to the United States Constitution. After he completed the presidential oath, Obama received in his honor as the new president the 21-gun salute, and the first playing of four ruffles and flourishes and the march "Hail to the Chief" by members of the armed forces.

Obama delivered his inaugural address to the crowds as the president of the United States following his swearing-in ceremony. Poet Elizabeth Alexander then delivered the inaugural poem, "Praise Song for the Day", and civil rights activist Joseph Lowery, minister of the United Methodist Church, delivered the benediction. The United States Navy Band "Sea Chanters" chorus concluded the ceremony with a performance of the United States national anthem, "The Star-Spangled Banner".

=== Oath of office ===
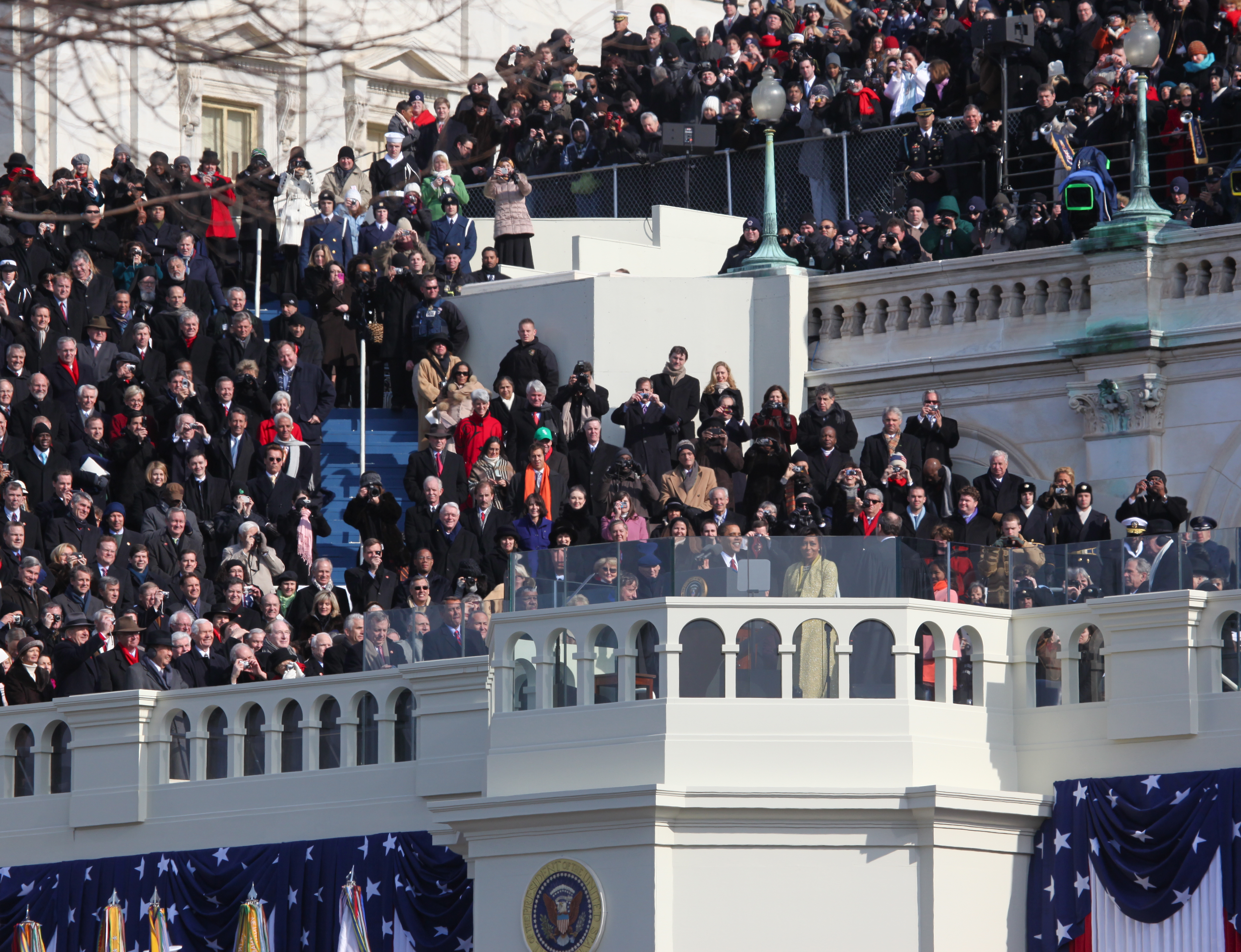
Obama being sworn in on the steps of the National Mall

Presidential Oath of Office
Taking the Oath at the U.S. Capitol
Barack Obama takes the presidential
oath administered by Chief Justice John Roberts on January 20, 2009.

Re-taking Oath at the White House
Chief Justice Roberts re-administers the presidential oath to President Obama on January 21, 2009.

Chief Justice John Roberts administered the oath of office to Obama. Michelle Obama held the Bible, which was used by Abraham Lincoln at his 1861 inauguration, as Barack Obama placed his hand on the Bible and recited the presidential oath. Nearly four years earlier, then-Senator Obama had been one of 22 senators to vote against Roberts during Roberts' Supreme Court nomination; the inauguration marked the first time a chief justice administered the oath to a president-elect who had previously voted against the chief justice's confirmation.

Roberts and Obama made several mistakes as they recited the oath. The proper wording for the oath of office is prescribed in the Constitution:

I do solemnly swear that I will faithfully execute the office of President of the United States and will to the best of my ability preserve, protect, and defend the Constitution of the United States.

Roberts had practiced for the ceremony carefully. However, a memo noting his planned pauses in the recitation of the oath failed to reach Obama's staff before the swearing-in. As a result, Obama inadvertently interrupted Roberts during the first phrase, stating "I, Barack" while Roberts was finishing "do solemnly swear". Obama then correctly repeated the entire phrase "I, Barack Hussein Obama, do solemnly swear."

Roberts, who was not using notes, rendered the next phrase as "that I will execute the office of president to the United States faithfully," misplacing the word faithfully and saying president to instead of president of. Obama repeated, "that I will execute", then paused. Roberts attempted to correct the wording, but stumbled: "the off– faithfully the pres– the office of President of the United States." Obama then repeated Roberts' initial incorrect wording.

Roberts ended the presidential oath by appending the phrase "so help you God" to the end of the constitutionally prescribed oath, and Obama responded "so help me God" when he was prompted. Obama had asked previously to include "so help me God" after the oath. Roberts then congratulated Obama as the new president.

==== Second oath ceremony ====
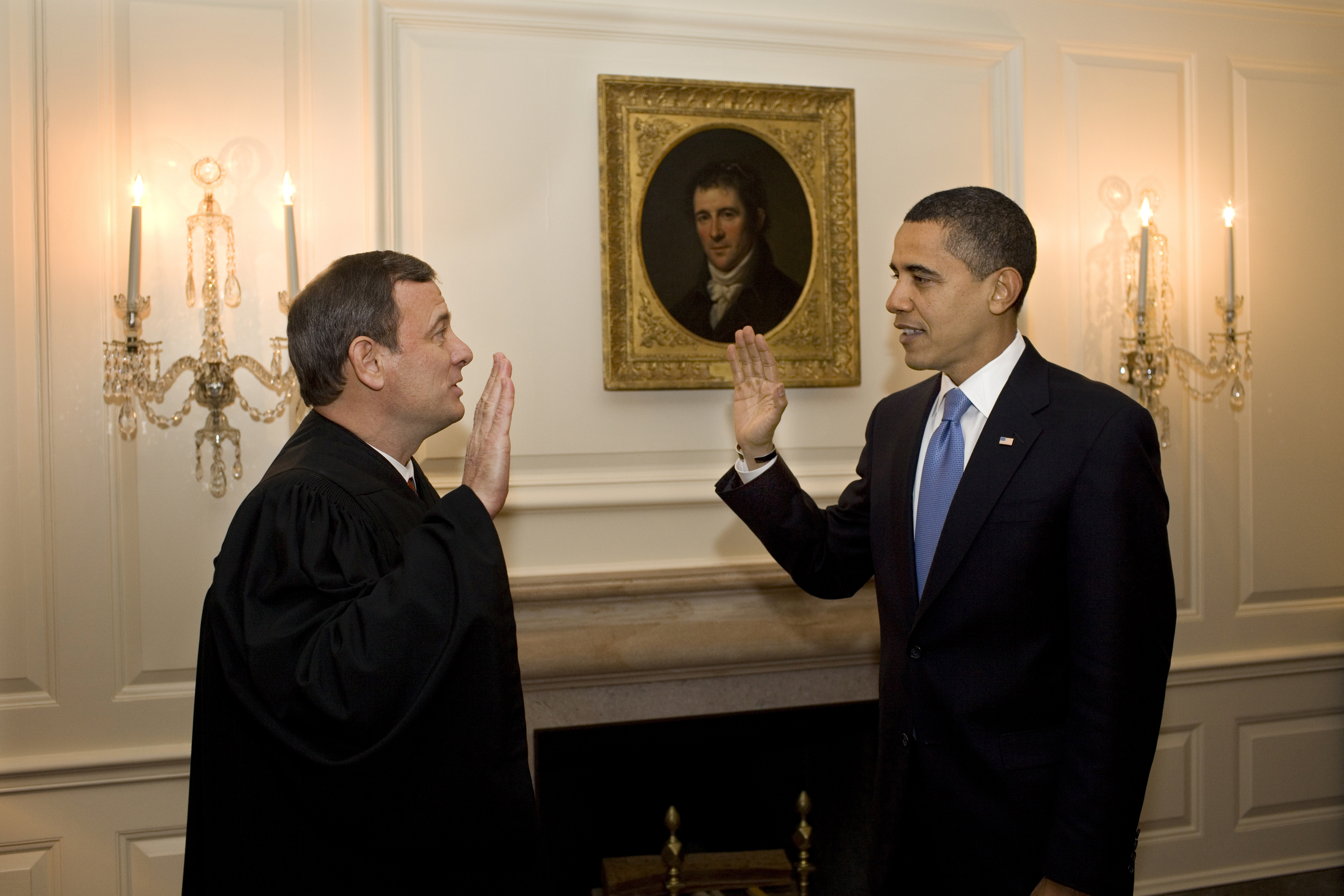
President Obama (right) retakes the oath of office from Chief Justice Roberts at the White House on January 21, 2009. President Obama and Chief Justice Roberts stand near a portrait of Benjamin Henry Latrobe, designer and an early Architect of the Capitol.

Much public discussion arose about the errors in administering and reciting the oath. Several constitutional scholars said that Obama should retake the oath. Boston University constitutional scholar Jack Beermann suggested that while the courts would likely never even consider a challenge, he would still advise Obama to retake the oath if he were his lawyer since "the Constitution says what he's supposed to say." Although Robert Gibbs, White House press secretary, indicated at first that President Obama did not plan to retake the oath, Chief Justice Roberts agreed to re-administer the oath at the request of White House counsel Greg Craig. The second oath ceremony took place on the evening of January 21, 2009, in the Map Room of the White House before a small audience of presidential aides, reporters and a White House photographer. Craig said that the White House ultimately decided to re-administer the oath out of an abundance of caution. Craig added that "the oath of office was administered effectively and ... the President was sworn in appropriately ... But the oath appears in the Constitution itself." No Bible was present during the retake of the inauguration.

==== Inaugural address ====
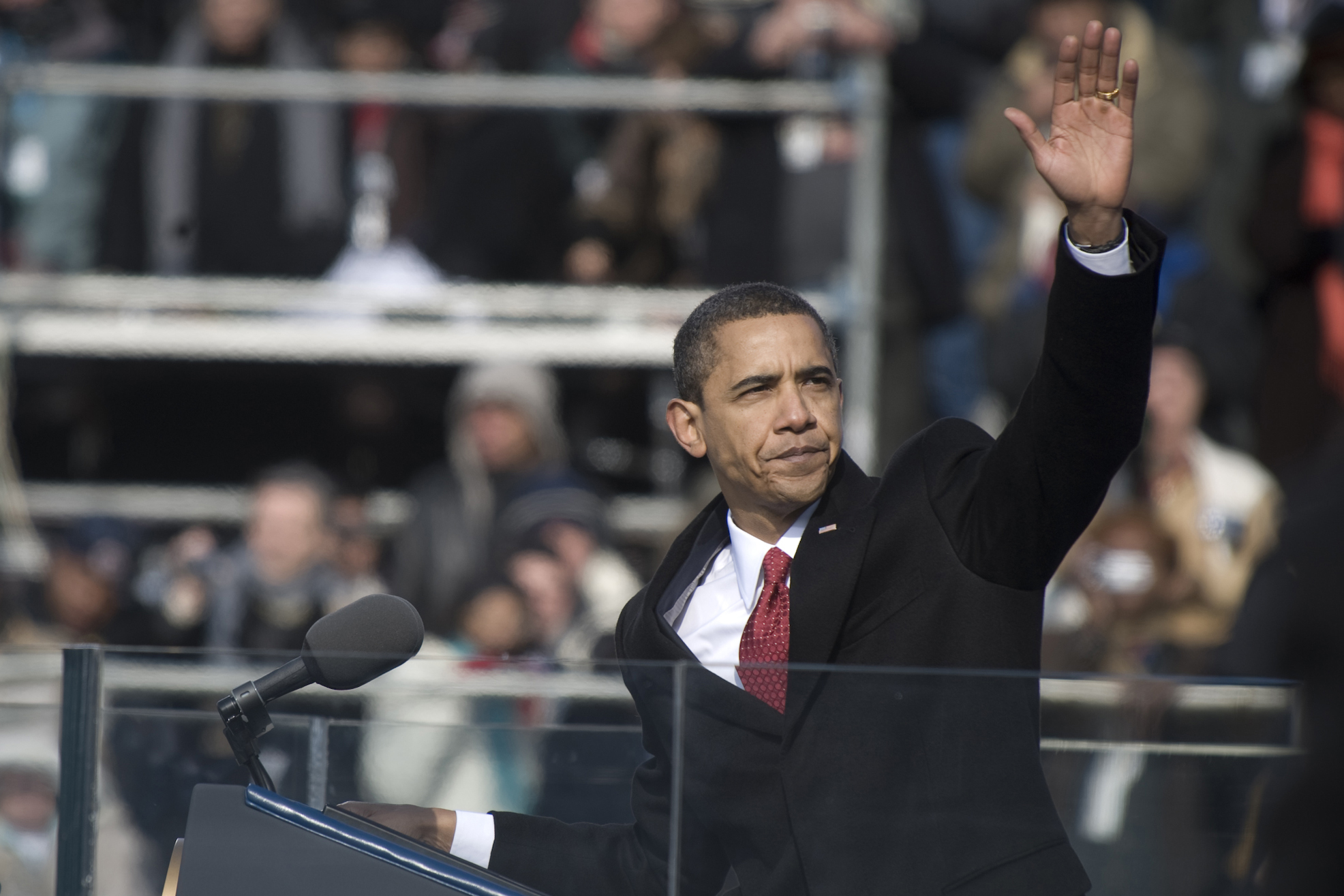
President Obama after giving his first presidential speech

The central theme of President Obama's inaugural address was a call to restore responsibility—both in terms of accountability in Washington and the responsibility of ordinary people to get involved. Obama's address did not have memorable sound bite phrases. Instead, he used traditional references to connect his new administration with the nation's history in a speech that was understated deliberately, according to rhetoric expert James Mackin.

Inaugural Address
Inaugural address of Barack Obama (21:21)
Barack Obama delivers his inaugural address on January 20, 2009.
(Duration: 21 minutes, 21 seconds)

Inaugural address of Barack Obama (audio-only version)
Audio version of January 20 address

Obama concluded the second paragraph of his address by saying, "we the people have remained faithful to the ideals of our forebears and true to our founding documents." The speech reinforced words such as "legacy" and "heritage", as well as values such as "honesty", "courage", and "patriotism", which "are old" values. Near the end of the speech, Obama referred to words written by Thomas Paine in The American Crisis, which were ordered by George Washington to be read to his troops: "Let it be told to the future world ... that in the depth of winter, when nothing but hope and virtue could survive ... that the city and the country, alarmed at one common danger, came forth to meet [it]." Because Barack Obama's campaign message focused on the need for change, Mackin noted that Obama sought to reassure Americans that he would operate as president within the margins of the nation's traditions.

Obama's goal for his Inaugural speech was to stir the following response among Americans: "This is why I want to go into public service and be a better politician. This is why I want to go home and be a better parent, better worker, better citizen."

As part of Obama's call for responsibility, he said, "what is required of us now is a new era of responsibility—a recognition, on the part of every American" and "those of us who manage the public's dollars will be held to account." Obama quoted the lyrics of the Jerome Kern and Dorothy Fields song "Pick Yourself Up" from the musical comedy Swing Time, saying that "starting today, we must pick ourselves up, dust ourselves off, and begin again the work of remaking America." In an article for The New York Times, columnist and former drama critic Frank Rich noted the link to the lyric in Fields's song from the movie, writing that Obama offered in his address "one subtle whiff of the Great Depression".

Obama's speech contained several biblical references and was compared to the oratory of the "black church tradition". Obama also highlighted the United States' religious diversity, referring to the country's "patchwork heritage" as a strength and saying, "We are a nation of Christians and Muslims, Jews and Hindus and non-believers." This was the first time a United States president acknowledged American non-believers in an inaugural address.

Obama's inaugural address received mixed reviews, with some describing the tone of the speech a praiseworthy one of restraint and plain speaking, while others described the speech as low-brow and clichéd. Despite his optimism, Obama was critical of former presidents George W. Bush and Bill Clinton. David E. Sanger, chief Washington correspondent for The New York Times, described the speech as the harshest rebuke of an outgoing president during an inaugural address since Franklin Roosevelt's call for restoration of American values. The Bush administration was upset about the tone of the speech, saying that the speech veered from that of a ritualistic but respectful thanks to that of a public diatribe. Members of the Republican party viewed the speech as a missed chance to seek unity, while Rahm Emanuel, Obama's White House Chief of Staff, described the speech as a reflection of the mandate of the people. In an analysis of the inaugural address, one reporter described the speech as one that emphasized the burdens of the moment and the cloudy future whose challenges may be met with the resolve that is part of our American heritage.

==== Prayers ====
Obama's selections of Warren and Lowery to deliver prayers for the inaugural ceremony were controversial. Warren had a history of vocal opposition to same-sex marriage, and Lowery had a background as a civil rights activist. Neither Obama nor Warren made references during the inaugural program to issues of direct concern to the gay community. In the invocation, Warren asked for "forgiveness for Americans 'when we fight each other' and 'civility in our attitudes even when we differ.'" Warren mentioned Dr. Martin Luther King and Jesus in the invocation, and he concluded the invocation with the Lord's Prayer. Lowery used humor as he delivered the benediction. One of his messages was the statement that "as we leave this mountaintop, help us to hold on to the spirit of fellowship and the oneness of our family." Lowery concluded the benediction with a humorous message of anticipation for the day "when brown can stick around, when yellow will be mellow, when the red man can get ahead man and when white would embrace what is right".

=== Post-ceremony traditions ===
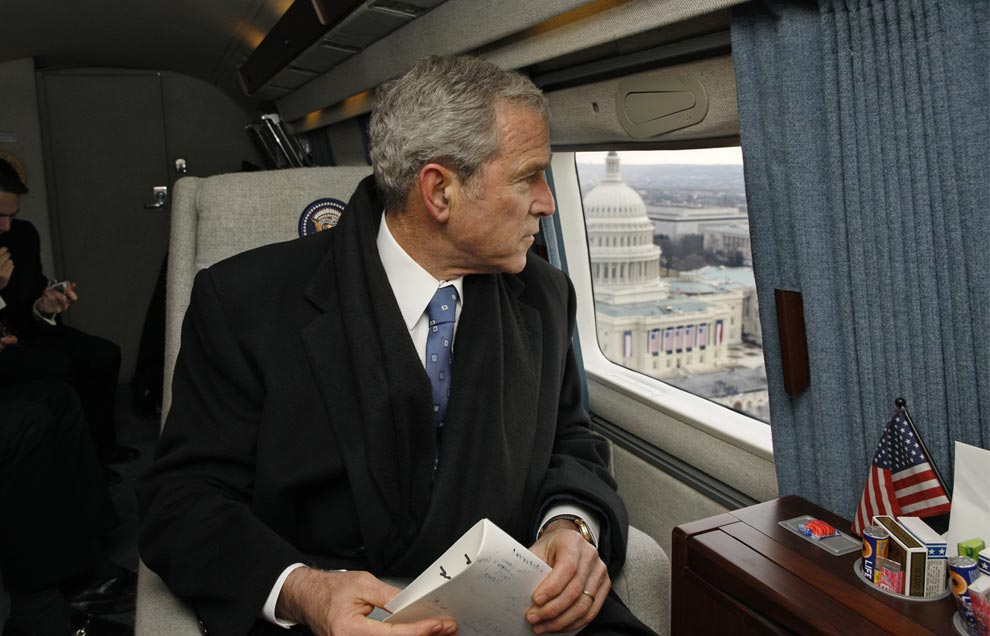
Former president George W. Bush looks at the U.S. Capitol as he is departing on a US Marine Corps helicopter after the inauguration.

After the inaugural ceremony on the west front of the U.S. Capitol, President Obama, First Lady Michelle Obama, Vice President Joe Biden and Jill Biden escorted former president George W. Bush and former first lady Laura Bush to the honorary departure ceremony on the east side of the U.S. Capitol. Before the luncheon and in keeping with tradition, President Obama signed his first presidential orders in the President's Room at the Capitol, and then signed the guest book for the luncheon. The first order signed by Obama was a proclamation declaring his Inauguration Day a "National Day of Renewal and Reconciliation", in which he called "upon all of our citizens to serve one another and the common purpose of remaking this Nation for our new century". Next, Obama signed orders to officially present the nominations for his Cabinet and several sub‑Cabinet officials to the U.S. Congress for its approval. The Obamas and Bidens then attended an inaugural luncheon at the U.S. Capitol before traveling from there to the presidential reviewing stand at the White House to watch the parade.

==== Congressional luncheon ====
As former president George W. Bush and former first lady Laura Bush began their journey to their Prairie Chapel Ranch, which is their Texas home, the Obamas and Bidens joined several congressional guests for the inaugural luncheon in National Statuary Hall at the U.S. Capitol. Guests included top Washington lawmakers as well as former presidents and vice presidents. Commemorating the Abraham Lincoln Bicentennial, the red and white china used during the luncheon were replicas of those used in the Lincoln White House.

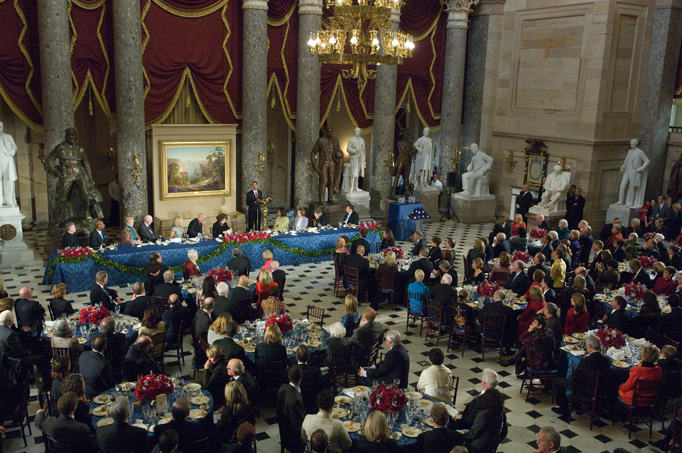
President Obama addresses the luncheon attendees in National Statuary Hall at the U.S. Capitol.

A luncheon at the U.S. Capitol has been part of the inaugural program since 1953 (before that time, the luncheon was usually held at the White House and hosted by the outgoing president and first lady). The menu for the 2009 inaugural luncheon, which often features dishes representative of the home states of the new president and vice president, included seafood stew, duck and pheasant entrees with Pinot noir wine, and a dessert of apple cinnamon sponge cake with sweet cream glacé. Since 1985, a painting has served as a backdrop for the head table. For the 2009 inaugural luncheon, the featured painting was Thomas Hill's 1865 View of the Yosemite Valley, a painting that commemorated Abraham Lincoln's 1864 signing of the Yosemite Grant, which was the first time the federal government protected park lands for public use.

During the luncheon, Senator Ted Kennedy collapsed after suffering a seizure, and he was transported to a hospital for medical treatment. Early reports about the medical emergency suggested erroneously that Senator Robert Byrd, the oldest member of the Senate, also fell ill during the luncheon. These reports were later denied, and Byrd, a longtime friend of Kennedy, eventually explained that the Kennedy incident disturbed him and caused him to leave.

==== Inaugural parade ====
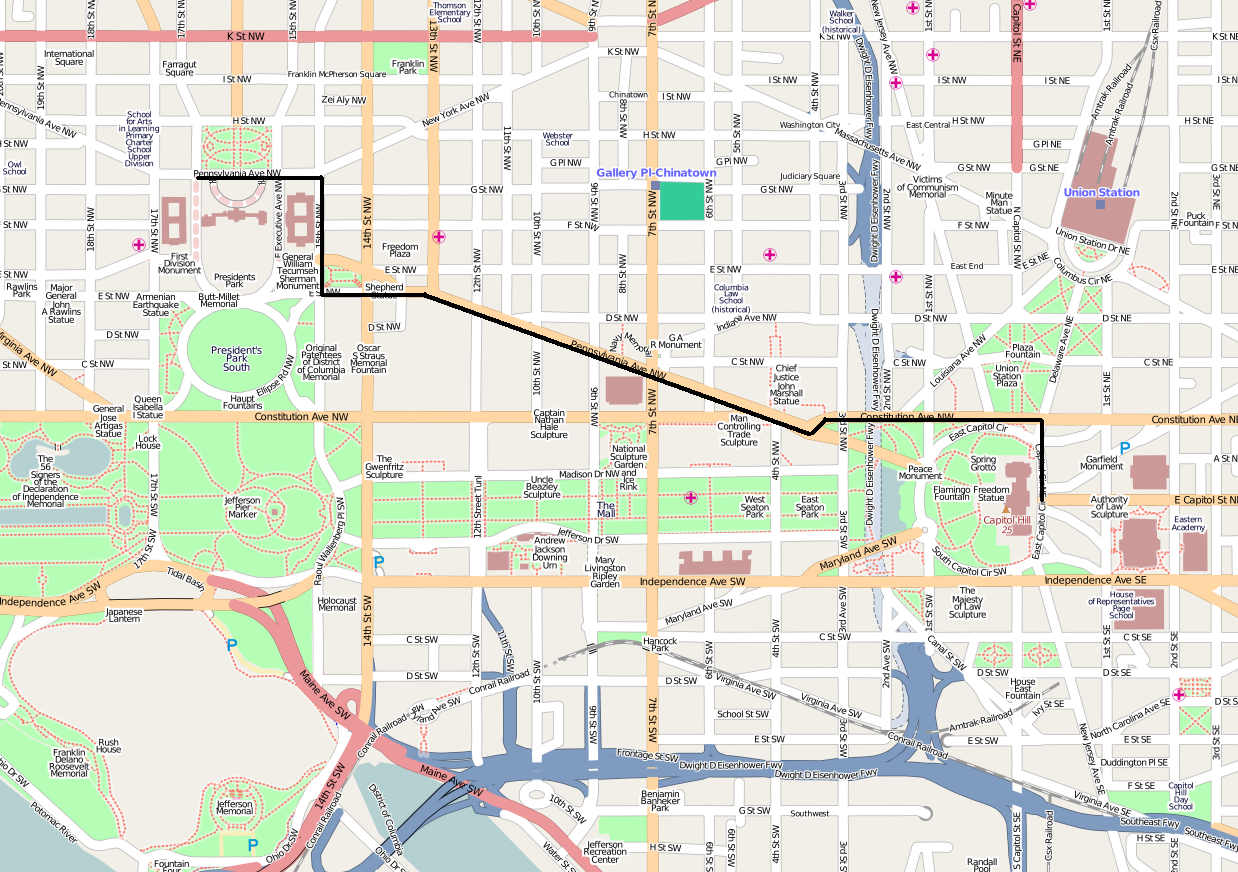
2009 Inaugural parade route

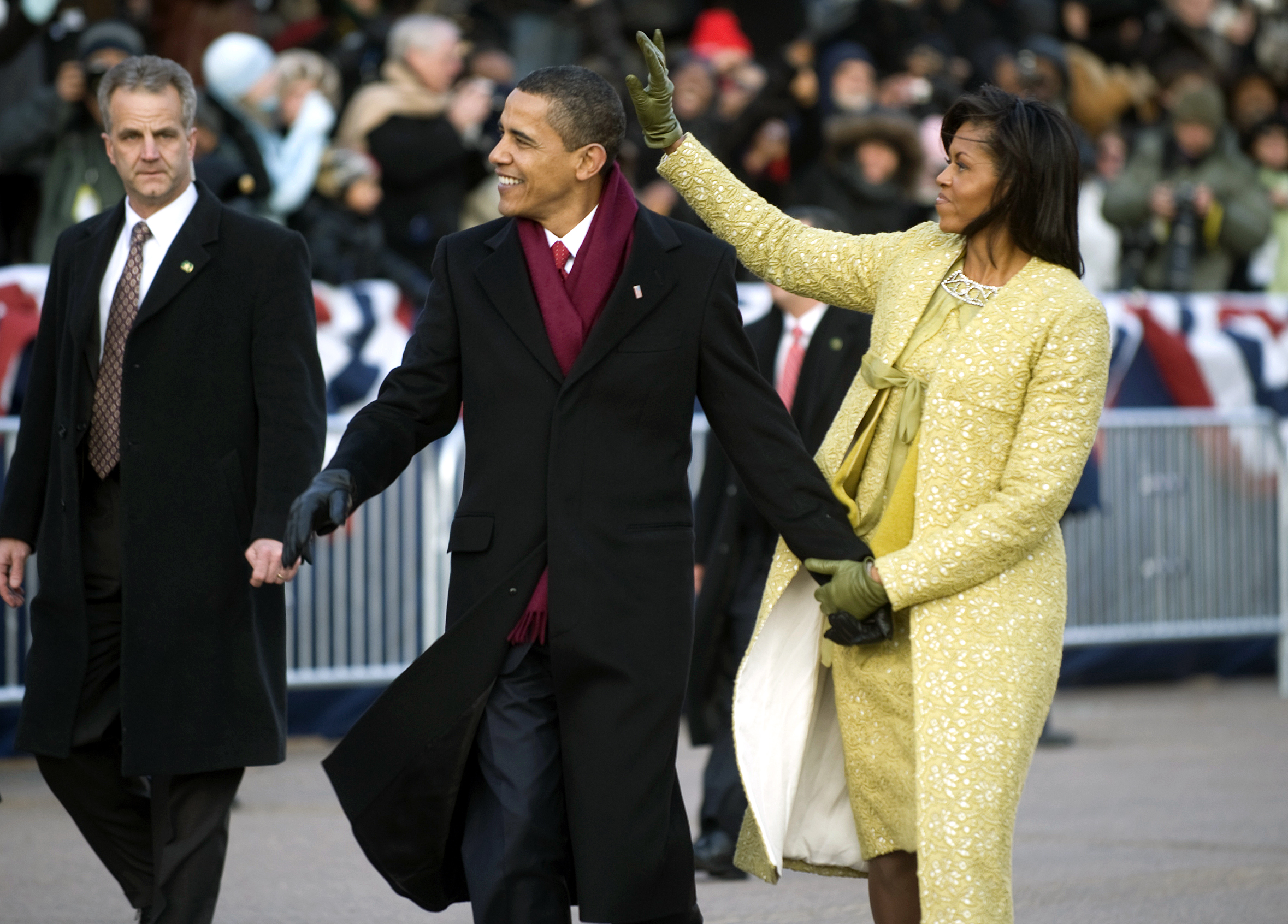
President Obama and First Lady Michelle Obama walking the inaugural parade route

The inaugural parade route ran along Pennsylvania Avenue, N.W. from the U.S. Capitol, ending at the north face of the White House. During most of the parade, President Obama and First Lady Michelle Obama traveled in the new armored limousine because of potential security threats. The President and First Lady twice exited their limousine, walking on Pennsylvania Avenue for portions of the parade. Vice President Biden and his wife Jill walked the parade route at several points with their children Beau, Hunter and Ashley.

The parade lasted more than two hours during the afternoon and early evening following the inaugural ceremony. Parade participants included 15,000 people, 240 horses, a mariachi band, dozens of marching bands, the Virginia Military Institute corps of cadets, and two drum and bugle corps: The Cadets and the Colts. Obama invited the marching band from Punahou School, his high school in Hawaii, to perform in the parade along with the marching unit of its Junior Reserve Officers' Training Corps.

Vice President Joe Biden invited several groups from Delaware to march in the parade. The Delaware section was led by the Delaware Volunteer Firemen's Association of which Biden is an honorary member, the Fightin' Blue Hen Marching Band, The Pride of Delaware, from Biden's alma mater, the University of Delaware, and the Delaware State University Hornets Approaching Storm marching band.

NASA astronaut Rex J. Walheim marched in the parade carrying an American flag and wearing a prototype of NASA's next generation spacesuit. Astronaut Michael L. Gernhardt drove a prototype lunar rover in the parade. In addition to Astronauts Walheim and Gernhardt, the crew of the STS-126 Space Shuttle Endeavour mission also marched in the inaugural parade.

==== Inaugural balls ====
President Barack Obama and First Lady Michelle Obama attended 10 official inaugural balls during the evening of January 20, 2009. Barack Obama wore a new tuxedo made by Hart Schaffner Marx, a Chicago-based menswear company. He also wore a white bow tie, instead of the conventional black. Traditionalists considered this a fashion faux pas, as a white tie is conventionally only worn with a white waistcoat and tails. Michelle Obama wore a white, one-shouldered, sleeveless gown designed by 26-year-old New York-based designer Jason Wu, breaking with the recent practice set by former first ladies Laura Bush and Hillary Clinton, who showcased designers from their hometowns.

===== Barack Obama Neighborhood Inaugural Ball =====
The Neighborhood Inaugural Ball, one of six balls held at the Walter E. Washington Convention Center, was the first stop of the evening for the President and First Lady. The Obamas danced their first song as Beyoncé Knowles serenaded them with her rendition of the Glenn Miller classic "At Last". According to the Presidential Inaugural Committee, the Neighborhood Inaugural Ball was the first ball with free or affordable tickets, a contrast to recent history in which "inaugural balls generally have been closed to everyday Americans, populated instead by an exclusive circle of dignitaries and donors." A portion of the tickets for the ball was reserved for Washington D.C. residents.

===== Other Official Inaugural Balls =====
The nine other official inaugural balls attended by the Obamas that evening included:

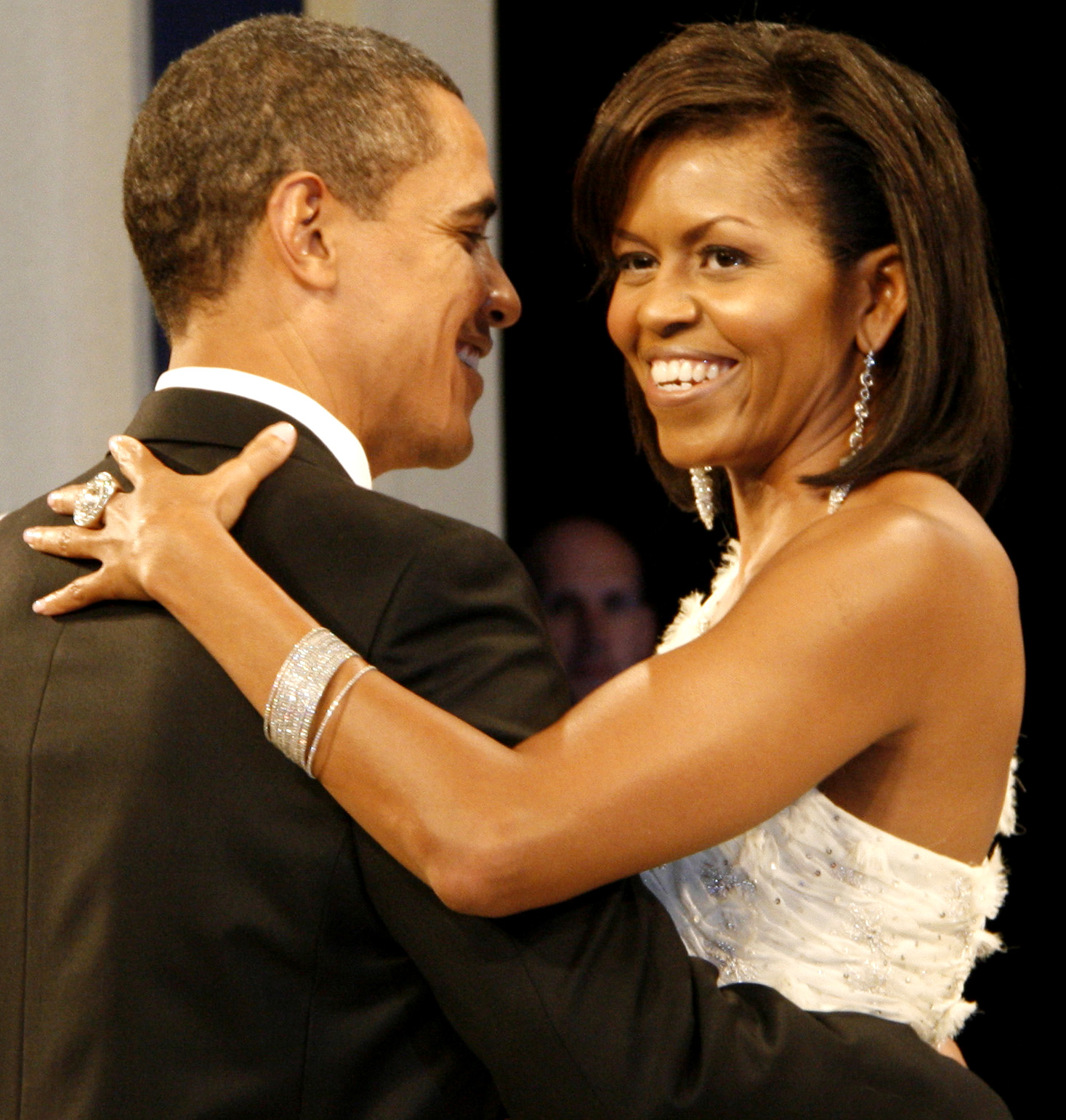
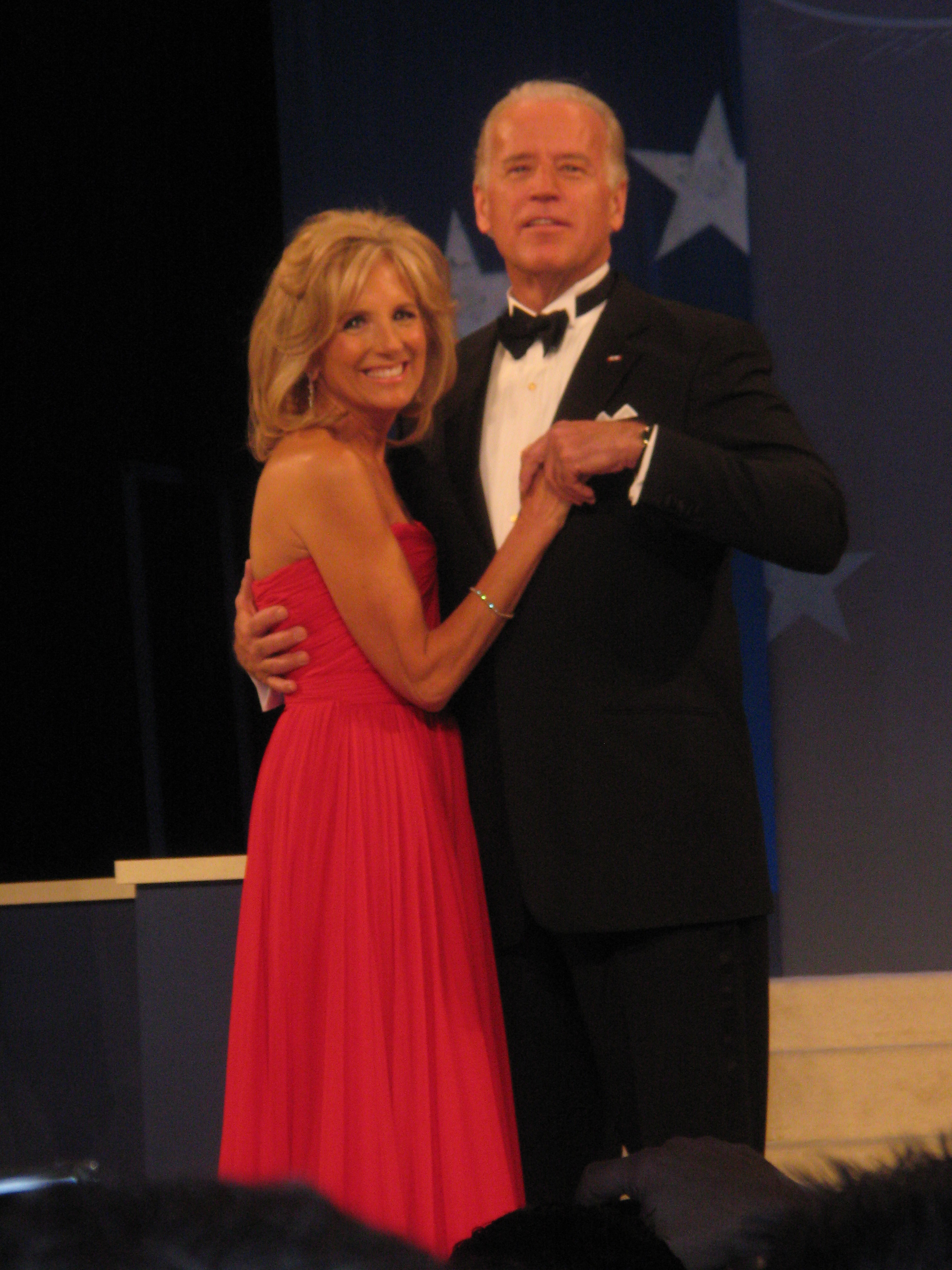
The Obamas (left) and Bidens (right) dance during the President Obama Home States Ball at the Washington Convention Center.
- The Commander-in-Chief's Ball, National Building Museum, held only for the second time, included active and reserve duty members of the United States military, the families of American service members currently deployed overseas, the families of military personnel killed in action and recipients of the Purple Heart.
- The Eastern Ball, Union Station, held for guests from the New England states of Connecticut, Maine, Massachusetts, New Hampshire, Rhode Island and Vermont and the Atlantic territories of Puerto Rico and the U.S. Virgin Islands. James Taylor performed for guests attending the ball.
- The Mid-Atlantic Ball, Washington Convention Center, held for guests from the District of Columbia and the Mid-Atlantic States of Maryland, New Jersey, New York, Virginia and West Virginia. This ball featured the first 2009 appearance by The Dead.
- The Midwestern Ball, Washington Convention Center, held for guests from the Midwestern states of Indiana, Iowa, Kansas, Michigan, Minnesota, Missouri, Nebraska, North Dakota, Ohio, South Dakota and Wisconsin.
- The President Obama Home States Ball, Washington Convention Center, for guests from Barack Obama's home states of Hawaii and Illinois. Music performed by Jack Johnson, Common, and The Don Cagen Orchestra.
- The Southern Ball, D.C. Armory, held for guests from the Southern states of Alabama, Arkansas, Florida, Georgia, Kentucky, Louisiana, Mississippi, North Carolina, South Carolina, Tennessee and Texas.
- The Vice President Biden Home States Ball, Washington Convention Center, for guests from Joe Biden's home states of Delaware and Pennsylvania.
- The Western Ball, Washington Convention Center, for guests from the Western states of Alaska, Arizona, California, Colorado, Idaho, Montana, Nevada, New Mexico, Oklahoma, Oregon, Utah, Washington and Wyoming, and the Pacific territories of American Samoa and Guam.
- The Youth Ball, Washington Hilton and Towers, an event held specifically for guests between the ages of 18 and 35 years old.

President Obama and the First Lady also attended one inaugural ball during the evening of January 21, 2009.

- The Obama for America Staff Ball, D.C. Armory, held for staff members of President Obama's 2008 presidential campaign. The ball featured speeches by David Plouffe, Joe Biden and Barack Obama, as well as a performance by Jay-Z and Arcade Fire.

===== After-Midnight Gathering =====
After they made their formal visits to the circuit of January 20 inaugural balls, the Obamas hosted an after-midnight gathering at the White House for 70 of their earliest supporters, close friends and family. Guests who attended the after hours celebration at the White House included Oprah Winfrey, Valerie Jarrett, David Axelrod, Chicago Mayor Richard Daley, Representatives Artur Davis of the state of Alabama and Neil Abercrombie of the state of Hawaii, and Michelle Obama's brother Craig Robinson. Members of the Illinois congressional delegation also attended the after hours event, including Senator Dick Durbin and Representatives Melissa Bean, Jan Schakowsky, Luis Gutierrez and Jerry Costello.

==== National prayer service ====
On January 21, 2009, President Obama, First Lady Michelle Obama, Vice President Biden and his wife, Jill Biden, gathered at the Washington National Cathedral for a national day of prayer. At the prayer service, the Obamas and Bidens were joined in the front pew by former president Bill Clinton and his wife, Hillary Clinton, who was sworn in as Secretary of State later that day. The prayer service was attended by about 3,200 other invited guests, including members of the U.S. Congress, diplomats and other dignitaries.

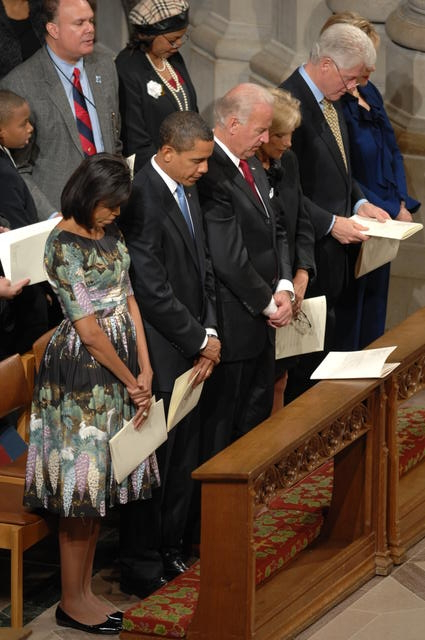
From left to right: the Obamas, Bidens, and Clintons in the front pew at the Washington National Cathedral on January 21, 2009

The theme of the interfaith worship service reflected inclusiveness and religious diversity, with a mix of Protestant pastors, female Hindu and Muslim religious leaders, rabbis, and Catholic and Episcopal bishops who delivered scripture readings and prayers throughout the service. Prayers for the service drew from passages from the 1789 inauguration prayer service of George Washington and the 1865 inaugural address of Abraham Lincoln, including phrases such as "with malice toward none, with charity for all". The featured sermon for the inaugural prayer service was delivered by Reverend Sharon E. Watkins, general minister and president of the Christian Church (Disciples of Christ) and the first woman to deliver the sermon for the inaugural prayer service. In her sermon, Watkins integrated passages from a variety of sources, such as passages summoned from sources rooted in the Hindu, Jewish, Muslim and Cherokee faiths.

== Unofficial events ==
In addition to the official events, groups and supporters held an array of gatherings and celebrations throughout Washington, D.C., and the surrounding region in the days before and the evening following the inauguration. One such event, a newly created "People's Inaugural Ball" was held for economically and physically disadvantaged people from across the United States who otherwise would be unable to afford to attend the inaugural festivities. Earl W. Stafford, a businessman from Fairfax County, Virginia, spent an estimated $1.6 million through his family's foundation to bring approximately 300 guests to Washington, D.C., hosting the ball on January 19, 2009, for a total of about 450 people. Clothing, shoes, tuxedos and hotel rooms for attendees were provided as part of the invitation.

== Attendance ==
=== Dignitaries, family and celebrity guests ===
Outgoing President George W. Bush, outgoing Vice President Dick Cheney, former presidents Jimmy Carter, George H. W. Bush, and Bill Clinton, and former vice presidents Walter Mondale, Dan Quayle, and Al Gore, along with their respective wives, attended the inauguration, including Hillary Clinton (Obama's choice to succeed Condoleezza Rice as secretary of state), who had been Obama's main opponent in the Democratic primaries (Clinton was attending as a former First Lady, not as the losing candidate). Cheney was in a wheelchair because of an injury that he suffered while moving boxes.

Congressman John Lewis, the only living speaker from the historic 1963 rally at the March on Washington, was present on the stage during the inauguration. More than 180 of the Tuskegee Airmen attended as invited guests for the inauguration. The five-person crew of US Airways Flight 1549 attended the swearing-in ceremony, including Chesley Sullenberger, the pilot who landed the aircraft in the Hudson River near Manhattan after losing both engines due to a bird strike just after departing LaGuardia Airport five days earlier.

Eighty-seven-year-old Sarah Obama led a group of Obama's Kenyan relatives from his father's home village of Kogelo. Other relatives who traveled from Kenya as guests included Obama's aunt, Maggie Obama, his uncle, Sayid Obama, as well as his half-brother Malik Obama. Also, Kenya youth activist and Chair of the Martin Luther King Jr. Africa Foundation, Mwangi Mukami, attended the Inaugural events. Mukami had served as Chair of the Obama Worldwide Supporters Campaign though it was unrelated to the official campaign. Joe Biden's son, Beau, Attorney General for the state of Delaware and an officer and Judge Advocate in the Delaware Army National Guard, received a special furlough from serving in Iraq to participate in the ceremonies.

Celebrity guests included the actors Dustin Hoffman, Samuel L. Jackson, Tom Hanks and Denzel Washington, talk show host Oprah Winfrey, singer Beyoncé Knowles, director Steven Spielberg, Colombian singer Shakira, boxer Muhammad Ali, and golfer Tiger Woods.

=== Crowds and general ticket holders ===
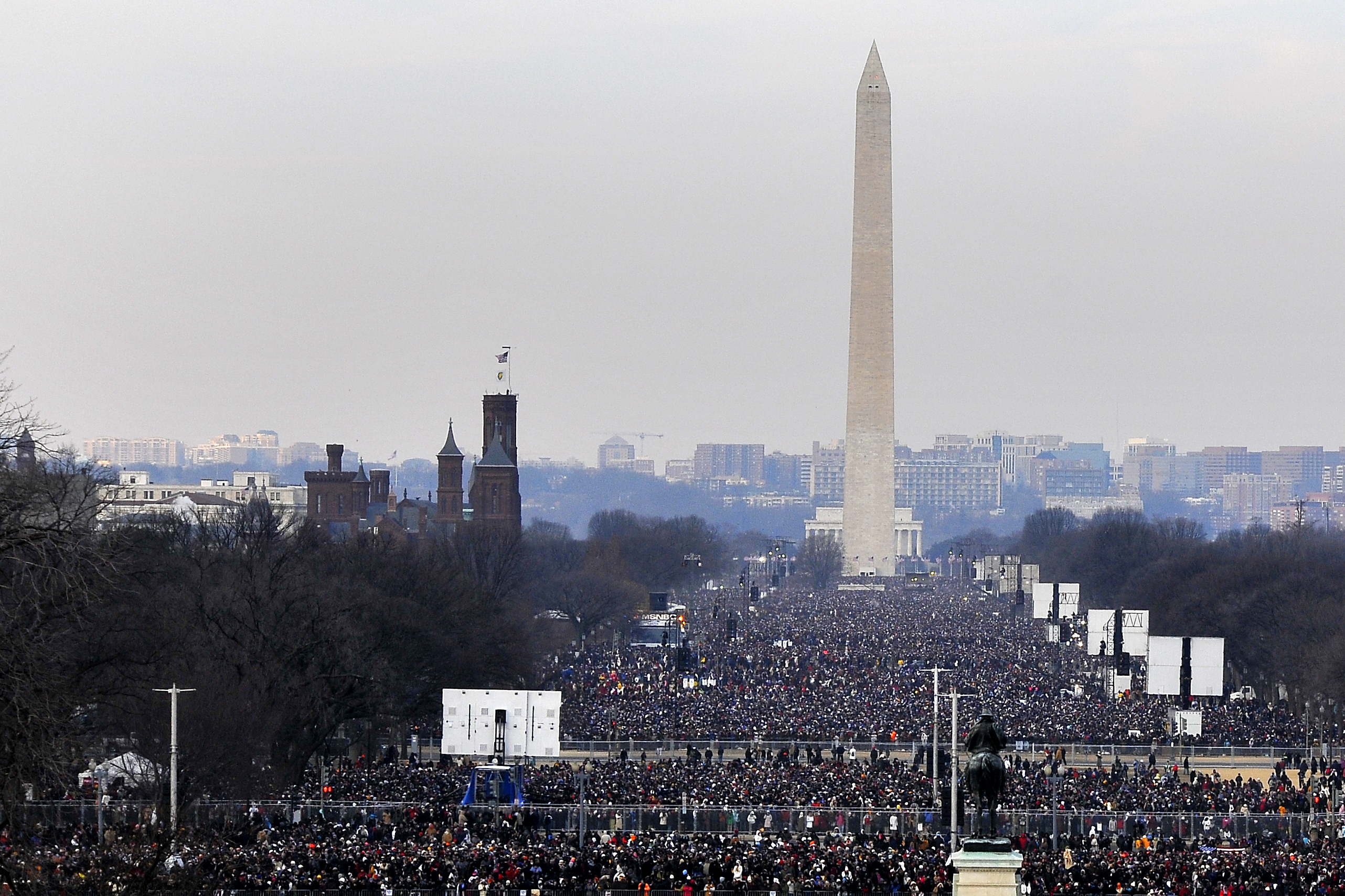
Crowds watch the inauguration at the National Mall. The Washington Monument, and the Lincoln Memorial behind it, are in the background.

No official count was taken of the number of people attending the inaugural ceremony, although multiple sources concluded that the ceremony had the largest audience of any event ever held in Washington, D.C. Government agencies and federal officials, who coordinated security and traffic management, determined the attendance count to be 1.8 million people based on information collected by several cameras and individuals on the ground. The Washington Post reported the estimated crowd size for the inaugural ceremony, and the National Park Service said it did not contest the estimate.

Stephen Doig, a professor at Arizona State University, estimated that 800,000 people attended the inauguration ceremony using the same satellite image. Although the image was taken a little less than 45 minutes before Obama's swearing-in ceremony, Doig adjusted his estimate to include people who were still arriving in the area before the event. Despite his crowd estimate, Doig stated that "if I had to bet, I would say the [Barack] Obama crowd is in fact bigger than those that showed up for [Johnson] or any of the other things ... I'm wholly prepared to think it was the largest crowd." Approximately 1.2 million people had attended the second inauguration of Lyndon B. Johnson in 1965.

Amid the massive crowds that arrived at the U.S. Capitol for the inauguration, about 4,000 ticket holders were unable to gain entry to reserved areas on the Capitol grounds after security personnel closed the gates at the start of the formal ceremony. Many ticket holders were stuck in tunnels where pedestrian traffic was directed to and from the National Mall. People dubbed one such tunnel "the Purple Tunnel of Doom", after the purple tickets that would-be viewers held. Others remained stuck in long lines as they waited to gain entry to the reserved areas. Senator Dianne Feinstein, in her capacity as chair of the Joint Congressional Committee on Inaugural Ceremonies, launched an investigation to address complaints by the affected ticket holders. The committee later announced that ticket holders who were unable to enter the Capitol grounds to view the ceremony would receive a copy of the swearing-in invitation and program, photos of President Obama and Vice President Biden and a color print of the inaugural ceremony.

Inauguration Day broke several records for the Washington Metropolitan Transit system. The 1,120,000 estimated Metrorail riders broke the record of 866,681 trips set the day before (which had broken the record set on July 11, 2008), and marked the first million-trip day in the system's history. Metro also provided 423,000 bus trips and 1,721 MetroAccess trips for a total of 1,544,721 trips, the highest ridership day ever in the transit authority's history. As of October 2018, the inauguration day crowd is still the largest in Metrorail history, but the 2017 Women's March has the highest counted, not estimated, single-day ridership of 1,001,613. In addition, the Sunday events helped Metro set a Sunday single-day record of 616,324 that is still the largest Sunday crowd.

=== Security ===
As with the 54th and 55th presidential inaugurations, in 2001 and 2005, respectively, the 56th presidential inauguration in 2009 was designated as a National Special Security Event (NSSE), resulting in the United States Secret Service being the lead Federal agency for the development and implementation of the overall security plan; the Federal Bureau of Investigation (FBI) being the lead Federal agency for counter-terrorism, intelligence, and criminal investigation; and the Federal Emergency Management Agency (FEMA) being the lead Federal agency for crisis management in the aftermath of any terrorist attack, natural disaster or other catastrophic incidents. The United States Capitol Police had primary responsibility for security and emergency response within the Capitol Complex to include the Inaugural Platform and the Inaugural Luncheon. The NSSE designation was made by Michael Chertoff, Secretary of Homeland Security, on December 10, 2008. The inauguration took place in an era of enhanced security in the decade following the September 11 attacks. Because of the size of the crowds expected in Washington, D.C. for the inaugural activities, planners raised concerns about public safety and security. Army General Richard Rowe, head of the joint military task force for the Washington, D.C. area, explained that security forces had to stretch their imagination to anticipate previously unthinkable security threats, especially in light of the Mumbai attacks in India that occurred in November 2008. Attention was heightened by terrorist threats.

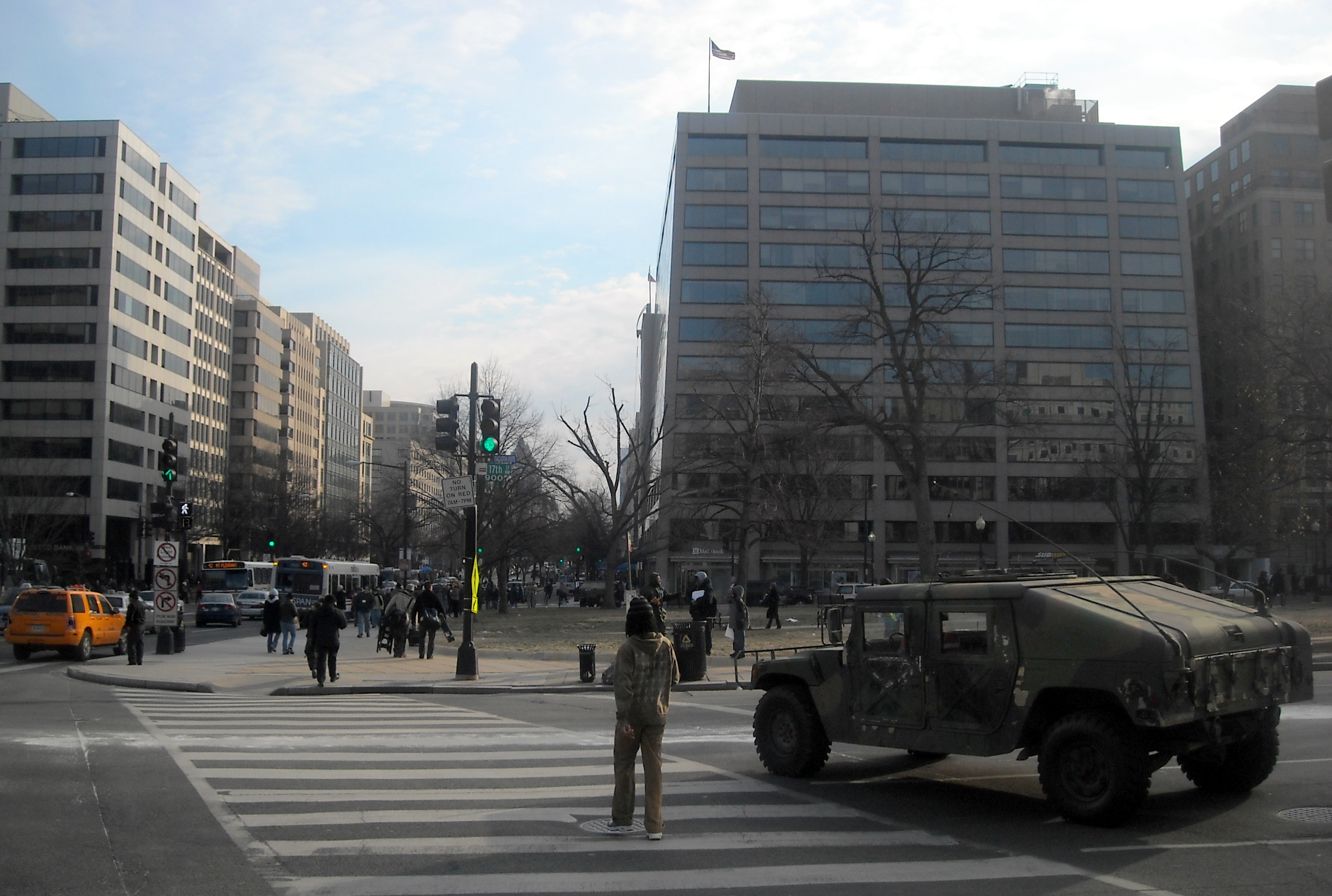
U.S. National Guard vehicle on K Street, N.W. in Washington, D.C. during the inauguration

The police presence in the District of Columbia temporarily doubled, augmented by the addition of 8,000 police officers from around the United States. The police force was assisted by 1,000 FBI agents to provide security for the event, and the Secret Service Countersniper team was assigned to hidden locations throughout the area. The Transportation Security Administration had over 300 officers from its National Deployment Force on hand to assist the Secret Service with security inspections of attendees entering the National Mall. Ten thousand National Guard troops were on site, with 5,000 troops providing security duty in a ceremonial capacity and 1,300 unarmed troops aiding Park Police in crowd control at the National Mall. C Company of the 1–175 Infantry provided security between the first and second public viewing areas of the National Mall at the 7th Street, N.W. intersection, while the remaining members performed other security functions. The Federal Aviation Administration implemented additional airspace restrictions over Washington, D.C. between 10:00 am and 6:00 pm on January 20, 2009. Secretary of Defense Robert Gates was chosen as the designated survivor to ensure continuity of government in case of catastrophe, and he spent Inauguration Day at a U.S. military installation outside of the Washington, D.C. area.

No one from the crowds at the swearing-in ceremony or parade was arrested on Inauguration Day. According to a senior federal agent associated with managing security, the fact that no arrests were made by any agency during the inaugural events was unheard of for a record crowd of nearly two million gathering in Washington, D.C. In the 2009 book In the President's Secret Service, author and journalist Ronald Kessler said intelligence officials received information that individuals associated with Al-Shabaab, a Somalia-based Islamist insurgency group, might try to disrupt the inauguration. More than a dozen counter-sniper teams were stationed along the inauguration parade route in response. The criminal records of nearby employees and hotel guests were scrutinized, but no such attack took place. Kessler also reported some perceived inadequacies in the security during the inauguration, including an instance in which more than 100 major campaign donors and VIPs could board "secure" buses without being checked.

== Viewership ==
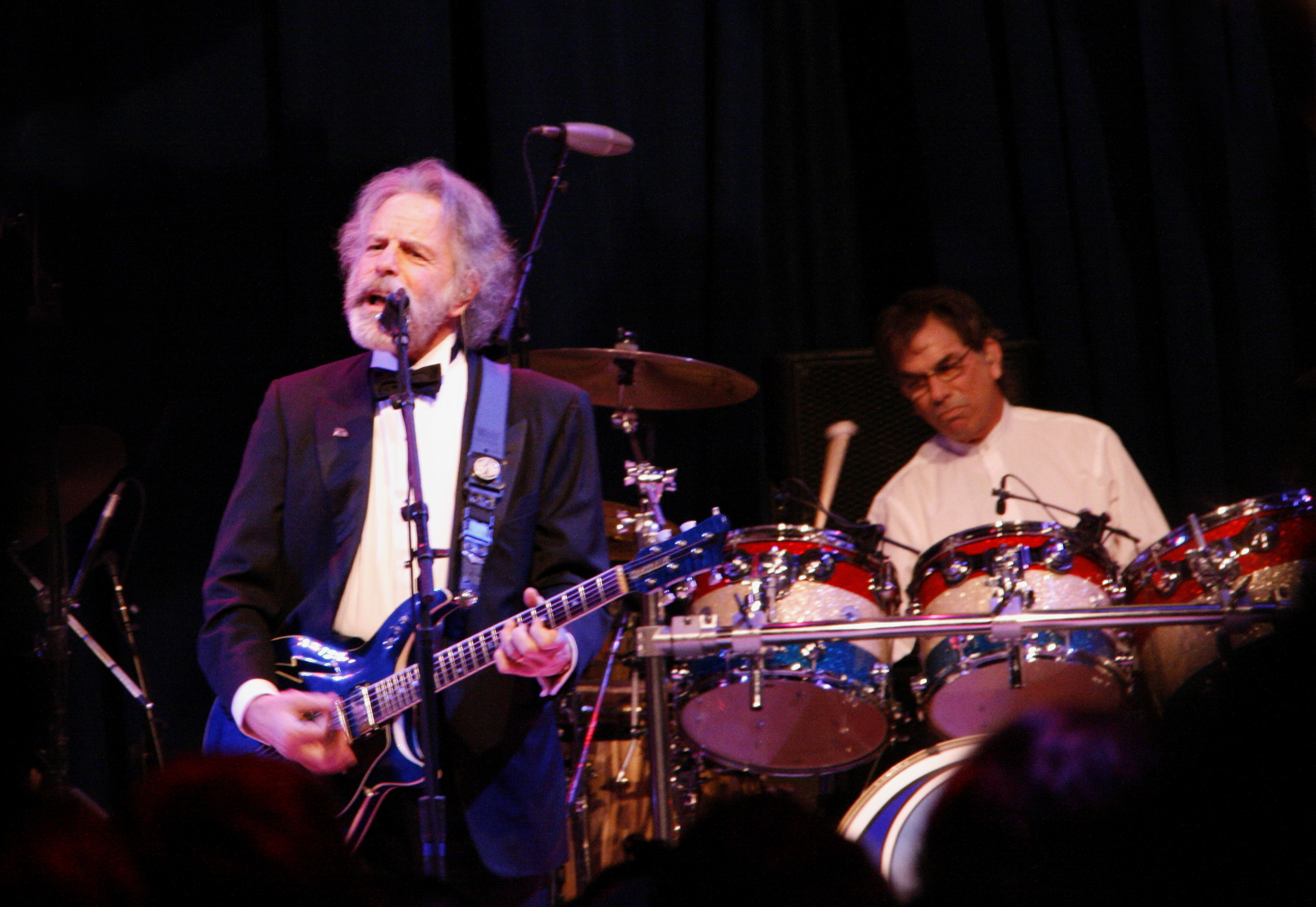
Bob Weir (playing guitar) and Mickey Hart (playing drums) of the Grateful Dead performing at the Mid-Atlantic Inaugural Ball, January 20, 2009

=== Television audience ===
Nielsen television ratings indicated that 29.2% of televisions in the 56 largest media markets in the United States were tuned to the inauguration, the largest audience since Ronald Reagan's first inauguration in 1981 and nearly double the viewership of the 2005 inauguration of George W. Bush. The Raleigh-Durham market had the largest TV audience with more than 51% of households tuned into the day's events, a number attributed in part to a snowstorm that kept people inside and in part to the large African American population in that community. Of the top 10 media markets in terms of viewership, four were in North Carolina, two were in Virginia and one was in Maryland, with the Washington D.C. market ranking second highest in television viewership. In addition, schools and workplaces across the country allowed viewing of the inauguration because the event occurred on a weekday.

As measured between 10:00 am and 5:00 pm EST, U.S. television viewership for the Obama inaugural events achieved an average of 37.8 million across 17 broadcast and cable channels, not including online viewers who watched live streaming video of the events. Despite this, viewership for the events was lower than the U.S. television viewership for the 1981 Reagan inaugural festivities, which averaged 41.8 million across the ABC, CBS and NBC broadcast networks alone.

Measurements of television viewership in Europe showed that Germany drew the largest audience for the Obama inauguration at 11 million viewers, followed by France at seven million and the United Kingdom at 5.1 million. According to the British Broadcasting Corporation (BBC), 6.5 million viewers in the United Kingdom watched highlights of the inauguration during its early evening news program.

=== Internet traffic ===
The Obama inauguration resulted in a surge of Internet traffic to news and social networking websites and a record number of video streams. CNN reported that it generated more than 21 million video streams by 3:30 pm EST that day—an all-time record, in addition to receiving 136 million page views that day. At one point during the surge of traffic to view the Obama inauguration, the BBC reported downtime during its own live video feed at its website. The heavy website traffic caused the BBC video feed to cut out for 30 minutes, with web visitors seeing the message "Please come back later" instead of the live video footage.

The technology company Akamai reported that 5,401,250 web users logged on news sites in less than one minute, the fifth highest peak among news websites since the company started tracking data in 2005. During at-peak usage, news websites served seven million simultaneous video streams, which was the highest number of simultaneous video streams in Akamai's history. The Obama inaugural ceremony not only achieved the highest Internet viewership for a U.S. presidential inauguration, the inaugural event was the first to feature a live audio description of a swearing-in ceremony and the first to include closed captioning in the live webcast of the event.

== International reaction ==
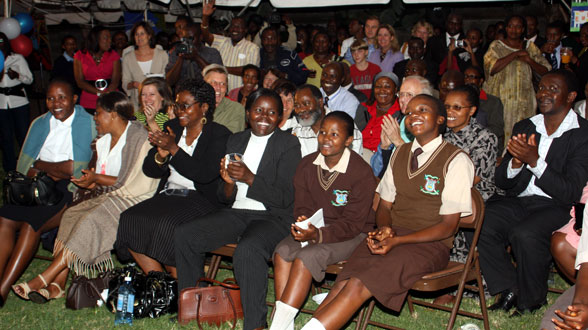
Kenyans observing the inauguration from the United States embassy in Nairobi, Kenya

The international community paid unprecedented attention to the inauguration of Barack Obama. Millions of people, including citizens of numerous countries around the world and American expatriates living in those countries, watched the Obama inauguration live on television and on the Internet. In some countries, the Obama inauguration garnered as much viewership as the opening ceremony of the 2008 Summer Olympics.

Celebrations surrounding the inauguration, praise of the event's significance and congratulations to Obama on his inauguration were internationally diverse. In Kenya, the home country of Obama's father, people celebrated the inauguration as a public holiday. Indonesians and Americans in Jakarta watched the inauguration at a free midnight ball featuring performances by students from State Elementary School Menteng 01, the school that Obama attended as a child. The city of Obama in Japan celebrated the event with fireworks, bell-ringing and hula-dancing at the Hagaji Temple. Governor General Michaëlle Jean and Prime Minister Stephen Harper of Canada extended congratulations on behalf of Canadians, while Mexican President Felipe Calderón wished Obama "great success in the work as the new President of the United States". Israeli President Shimon Peres described Obama's inauguration as a "great day" for the United States, and British Prime Minister Gordon Brown noted that "The whole world is watching the inauguration of President Obama, witnessing a new chapter in both American history and the world's history."

Leaders of some countries reserved enthusiasm for the Obama inauguration, with coverage of the event even muted in some places. Cuban President Raúl Castro, brother of former Cuban president Fidel Castro, declared that "[Obama] looks like a good man, I hope he is lucky", while Ricardo Alarcón, president of the Cuban legislature, admitted in his comments about Obama that "the incoming [U.S.] president 'is a big question mark.'" Iranian Foreign Minister Manouchehr Mottaki expressed hope for openness for a new direction, noting that "if Obama chooses the right path, compensates the past, lifts hostility and U.S. hegemony, and revises the previous political mistakes, we will have no hostility." State-owned Channel One Russia, Russia's flagship early evening news show, covered Obama's presidential inauguration as a minor news story, devoting much of the day's airtime instead to the gas war with Ukraine. The People's Republic of China covered the Obama inauguration live on its state‑controlled China Central Television, providing simultaneous translation into Mandarin Chinese with a brief delay to allow censoring of Obama's comments. When President Obama mentioned "earlier generations faced down fascism and communism", Chinese state television officials cut away abruptly from the televised speech and switched to a discussion in the studio. State-controlled print, radio and television media in North Korea provided no coverage or mention of the Obama inauguration in the hours after the event, opting instead to cover news about Equatorial Guinea welcoming the North Korean ambassador.

Ordinary citizens in Iraq even viewed the new president with cautious optimism. One Iraqi citizen opined that "If [Obama] can do as well as he talks, then all our problems are over", adding a belief that "[Obama] is a good man, but many people in Iraq believe all American presidents are the same and that we are a playground for their interests." Another citizen noted that "Obama won't get the same treatment,' ... 'But he won't have too long to prove himself to us.'"

== See also ==
- Presidential transition of Barack Obama – Transfer of presidential power from George W. Bush to Barack Obama
- First 100 days of Barack Obama's presidency – Period from January to April 2009
- Second inauguration of Barack Obama – The 57th United States presidential inauguration
- Presidency of Barack Obama
- Timeline of the Barack Obama presidency (2009)
- List of unofficial events for the first inauguration of Barack Obama
