= Vineeta Rastogi =

Activist and public health worker

Vineeta Rastogi (August 4, 1968, in Silver Spring, Maryland – December 6, 1995) was an American AIDS activist, public health worker and Peace Corps Volunteer in Zaire.

== Life ==
Vineeta Rastogi was born on August 4, 1968, in Silver Spring, Maryland. In 1986, she graduated Seneca Valley High School in Montgomery County, Maryland. She graduated magna cum laude from University of Maryland in 1990, where she was selected for membership in Phi Beta Kappa. Following a stint in the Peace Corps, she completed her graduate studies in epidemiology at the Harvard T.H. Chan School of Public Health, and had been accepted at Johns Hopkins School of Public Health for a Ph.D. when she was diagnosed with cancer. When the disease was terminal, she started the Vineeta Foundation to continue her life's work. She died on December 6, 1995 at age 27 in North Potomac, Maryland. She was survived by her husband, Brian Hennessey.

== Public health ==
After graduating from the University of Maryland, Rastagi took her public health calling to Zaire, where she worked as a Peace Corps volunteer in small villages, establishing the first family planning program in the area.

When Rastagi returned from Zaire, she attended the Harvard School of Public Health, where she studied epidemiology. During this time, she served as a United Nations election observer in Cambodia. She also worked in El Salvador, Vietnam, Cuba, and India.

In 1993, she was an Albert Schweitzer Urban Fellow, for which she worked to reduce infant mortality. and in 1994, was the Albert Schweitzer Award-winner (for Harvard's outstanding Public Health student). She was chosen by her classmates give the commencement address for her 1994 Harvard public health class.

Rastagi served as a delegate to the United Nations International Conference on Population and Development in Cairo, the International AIDS Conference in Yokohama, and the Asian-American Conference at White House. She was co-chair of the "Violence and Human Rights" Conference and a founding member of Young Indian-American Forum.

== Legacy ==
Today, the foundation that bears Rastogi's name is a major force in public health and human rights, both domestically and globally. The foundation was the sponsor of a 2009 Obama inaugural ball — the Health for All Blue Diamond Inaugural Ball — held at the National Museum of Natural History. Speakers included NIH director Dr. Anthony Fauci, and congressman John Conyers; entertainers included Jackson Browne and Graham Nash.
