= Purple Tunnel of Doom =

Line for Obama's 2009 inauguration

Coordinates: 38.8897468°N 77.0143747°W

Purple Tunnel of Doom, 2009
- Pedestrians entering Third Street tunnel
- Date: January 20, 2009
- Location: I-395 3rd Street Tunnel Washington, D.C.

Purple Tunnel of Doom was the name ascribed to the I-395 Third Street tunnel in downtown Washington, D.C., where thousands of holders of purple tickets lined up to witness the first inauguration of Barack Obama on January 20, 2009. Ticket colors corresponded to assigned viewing areas. Many were not admitted, despite having stood in line for hours.

== History ==
People were directed into the Third Street tunnel by police, but were not allowed to exit.

Among those who missed the ceremony were Seattle Mayor Greg Nickels,, daughters of Kathleen Kennedy Townsend, the Legislative Director for Lamar Alexander, staffers for John Barrasso, foreign policy advisers, and multiple members of staff from the Obama campaign.

News reports put the total number of purple-ticket-holders who were denied entrance to the inauguration at between 1,000 and 4,000. Pictures showed a lack of law enforcement or event personnel, and an overall bleak situation without basic amenities or facilities.

Similarly affected were blue-ticket-holders on the south side of the Capitol. Thousands of ticket-holders waiting outside the Blue Gate – in and around the triangular area bordered by C Street, 2nd Street, and Washington Avenue SW – were denied entrance as a result of a massive gate management failure. Terrance Gainer, the Sergeant at Arms of the United States Senate, stated that it appeared that the breakdown had occurred because there were more purple and blue tickets for those sections than bulky people in coats would permit.

The experience in the tunnel has been chronicled in numerous videos posted on YouTube, and in detailed accounts by The Huffington Post.

They knew exactly how many ticket holders there were. They knew people would show up early in massive numbers. They had months to prepare ... And their planning was clearly woefully inadequate and put thousands of people at risk of injury.

On January 22, 2009, the Joint Congressional Committee on Inaugural Ceremonies said that blue-, silver-, and purple-ticket-holders who were not admitted would receive copies of the swearing-in invitation and program, photos of Obama and Vice President Joe Biden, and a color print of the ceremony.

== Lessons learned ==
A multi-agency study was led by the Secret Service.

There were conflicting plans regarding the use of the Third Street crossover. The [Secret Service] map conflicted with the site specific map utilized by the U.S. Capitol Subcommittee. The [Secret Service] map indicated that Third Street would be utilized as a pedestrian crossover and parade route access point, while the U.S. Capitol Subcommittee map indicated it would be closed.

For Obama's second inauguration, the tunnel was closed.
