= Invitations to the first inauguration of Barack Obama =

Letters sent to inauguration invitees

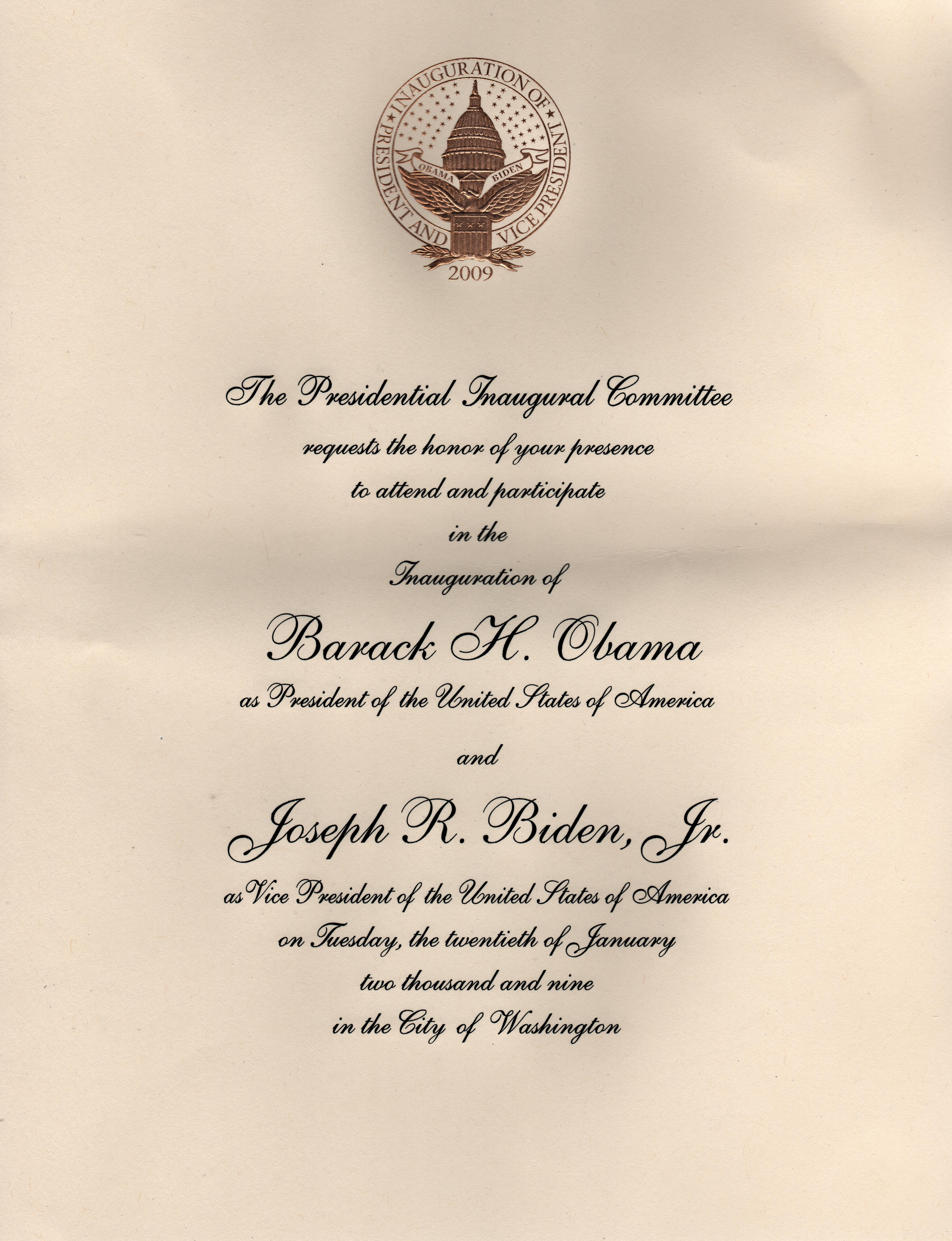
Photograph of the invitation to Barack Obama's inauguration

One million invitations to Barack Obama's inauguration were sent out in the first week of January 2009. Printed between December 11, 2008, and January 2, 2009, the invitations invited people to celebrate Barack Obama's inauguration as the forty-fourth President of the United States. The invitations have kept the same basic design of a gold seal and black script since the 1949 inauguration of Harry S. Truman, but this invitation was produced in a green manner, using recycled paper, by companies certified by the Forest Stewardship Council (FSC).

== Preparations ==
=== Design ===
The invitations have followed the same design since those for Harry S. Truman's presidential inauguration on January 20, 1949. The invitations have a gold embossed inauguration seal at the top of the page and black-inked script using customized Shelley Alegro and Kuenstler typefaces. The invitation reads, "The Presidential Inaugural Committee requests the honor of your presence to attend and participate in the Inauguration of Barack H. Obama as President of the United States of America and Joseph R. Biden Jr. as Vice President of the United States of America on Tuesday, the twentieth of January two thousand and nine in the city of Washington."

=== Printing ===
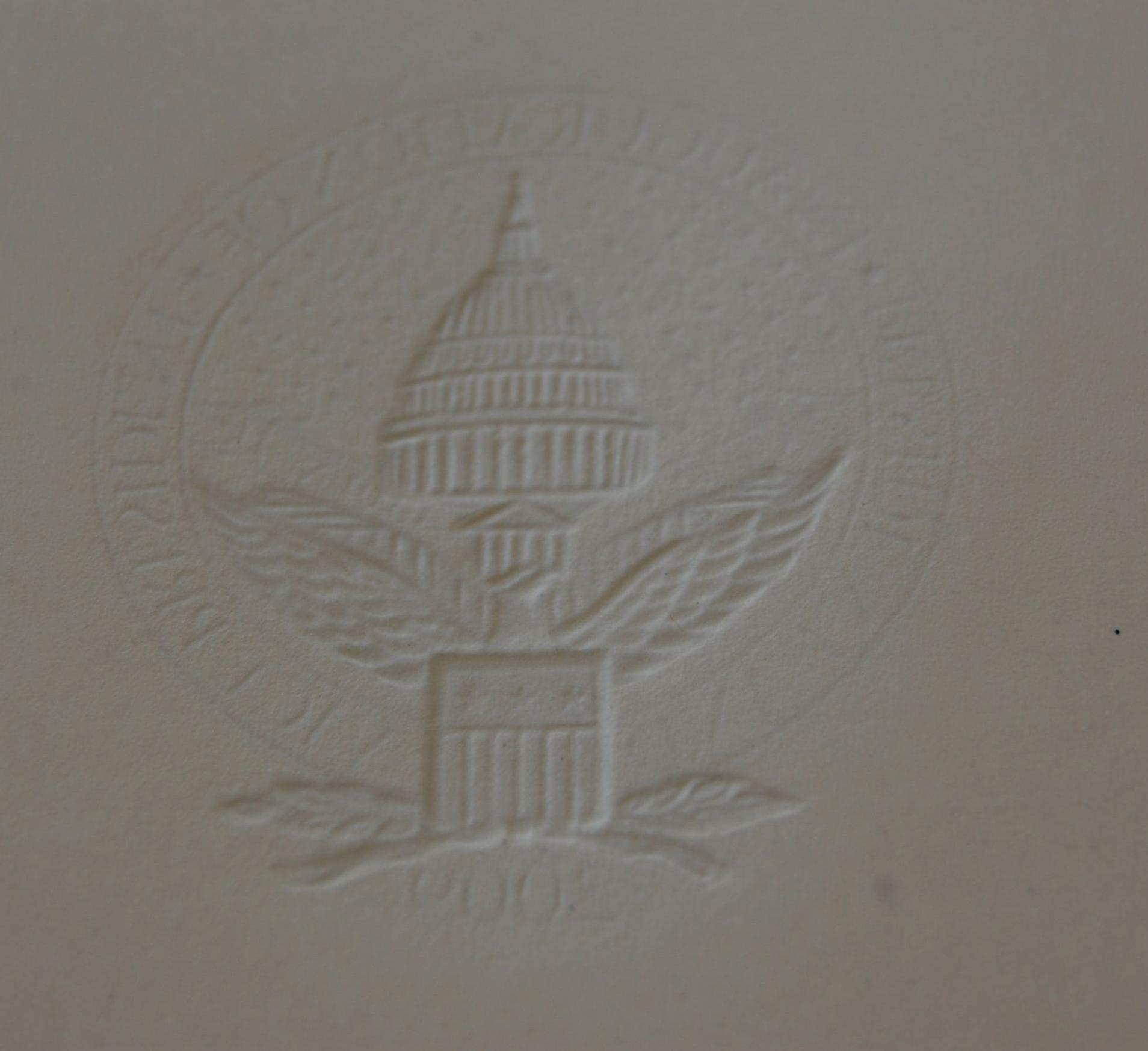
The reverse of the seal of Obama's inauguration invitation

Ink for the invitations was supplied by Chicago company BuzzInk, and the Joint Congressional Committee on Inaugural Ceremonies selected Precise Continental of Brooklyn, New York, to print the invitations. Precise Continental was selected because it is a union company, uses recycled paper, and is Forest Stewardship Council certified. The printing technique for the invitations was engraving. The design was cut into the surface of a copper plate, which was then inked and inserted into a printing press with a sheet of paper. The result is a slightly raised impression on the front of the page and a slightly indented impression on the bottom. The first plate had to be scrapped because it was engraved without the President's middle initial. The golden seal was engraved in three printing runs. The first print laid down a rough-textured basic gold shape. The second run added smoothness and shine, and the final print run added the fine details to the seal. One million invitations were printed over 20 hours every day between December 11, 2008, and January 2, 2009, with employees working in two shifts and taking breaks only on Christmas Day and New Year's Day. The invitations were printed one at a time on 11×17 sheets of paper, which were then cut in half to 8½×11 sheets.

=== Paper ===
The paper used to print the invitations on initially came from Michigan. Waste paper collected from local companies in Grand Rapids was collected by Louis Padnos Iron & Metal. It was shipped to Wisconsin, where it was turned into pulp. The Whiting Paper Mill, owned by Neenah Paper, another FSC certified company, converted the pulp into CLASSIC CREST Recycled 100 Natural White Papers manufactured by Neenah Paper, which contains FSC certified fibers and is made with 100 percent renewable green energy in a completely carbon-neutral, chlorine-free process. The paper was delivered to Precise by Central National-Gottesman, another FSC certified company.

=== Mailing ===
Prompt Mailers of Staten Island, New York, mailed the invitations, which also included a letter from the Presidential Inaugural Committee and a leaflet from the inaugural store. Between December 31, 2008, and January 7, 2009, 3,100 to 3,500 envelopes were filled and sealed every hour.

== Recipients ==
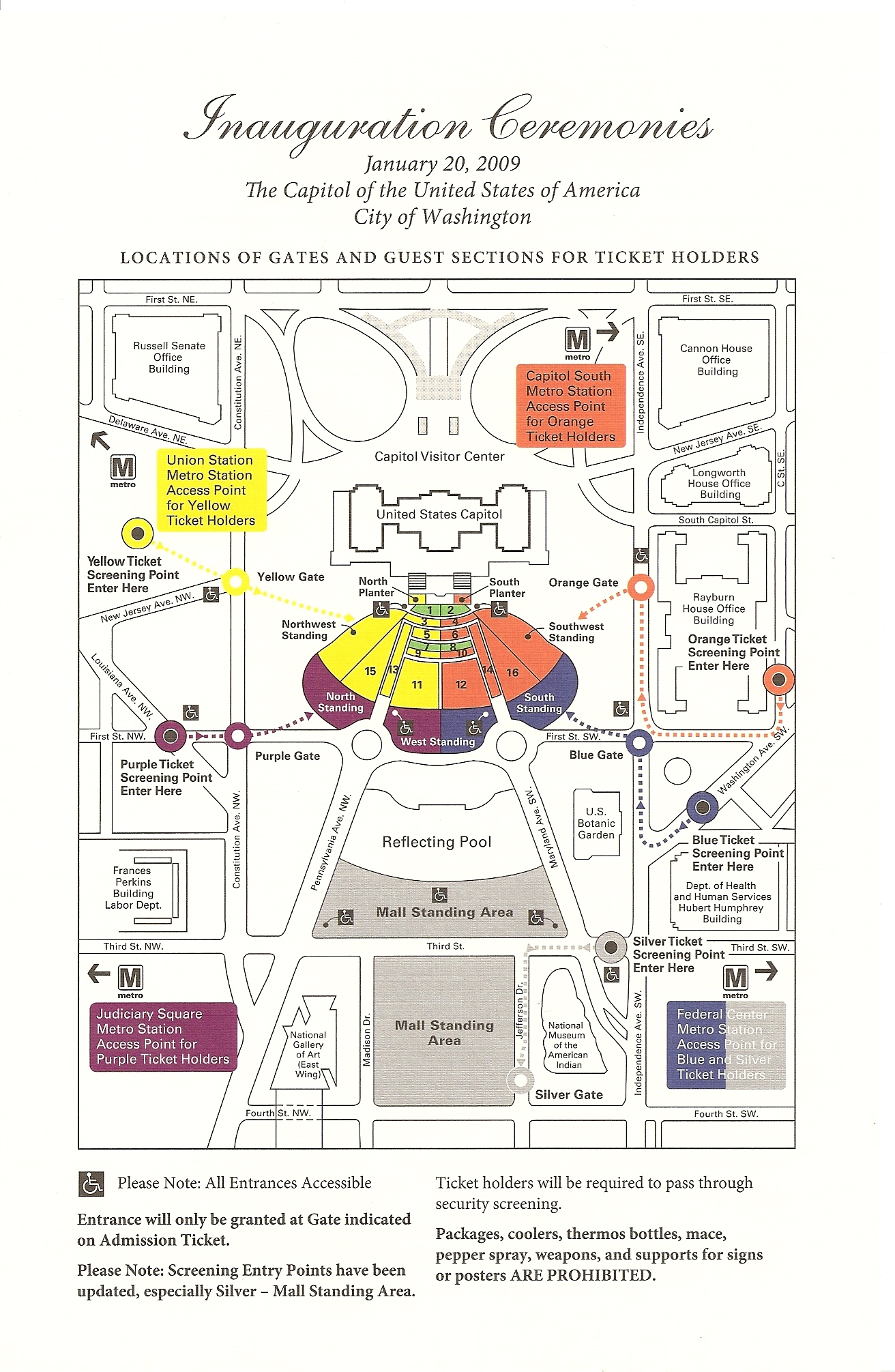
Color-coded assigned entrances and seating areas are noted in official map from the Joint Congressional Committee on Inaugural Ceremonies.

Invitations were sent to the chiefs of diplomatic missions to the United States and their spouses but not to any other representatives of foreign countries. As a result, North Korea's offer to send a senior envoy was rejected. The Tuskegee Airmen were among the invited guests for the inauguration. The five-person crew of US Airways Flight 1549, including pilot Chesley Sullenberger, were also invited. Entertainment industry figures such as Beyoncé, Jay-Z, Steven Spielberg, Magic Johnson, Dustin Hoffman, Muhammad Ali, John Cusack, and Oprah Winfrey received invitations, as well as politicians such as Arnold Schwarzenegger, Governor of California; Massachusetts Senator Ted Kennedy; and Arizona Senator John McCain. The invitation to Evangelical pastor Rick Warren drew some criticism.

Eighty-seven-year-old Sarah Obama led a group of Obama's Kenyan relatives from his father's home village of Kogelo. Other relatives traveling to Washington from Kenya as guests included Obama's aunt Maggie Obama and an uncle, Said Obama.

Members of the general public also received invitations to the inaugural ceremony. Invitations were sent to constituents, who received one of the 240,000 color-coded tickets to the inaugural ceremony distributed by House and Senate congressional members of the 111th U.S. Congress.
