= List of unofficial events for the first inauguration of Barack Obama =

The first inauguration of Barack Obama as the 44th president of the United States, which was held on January 20, 2009, had several unofficial events tied to ceremonies.

== Unofficial pre-events ==
In addition to the official events, an array of notable gatherings and celebrations were held throughout Washington, D.C. and the surrounding region in the days leading up to the inauguration, including:

- African-American Church Inaugural Ball, held on January 18, 2009 at the Grand Hyatt Washington.
- Aloha Inaugural Ball, held on January 18, 2009 by former Obama campaign workers at the Wardman Park Marriott Hotel.
- Black Tie & Boots Inaugural Ball, held on January 19, 2009 at the Gaylord National Resort & Convention Center, was sponsored by the Texas State Society.
- The Dreams of My Father American Scholars Inaugural Ball, held on January 18, 2009 at the Four Seasons, featured Alicia Keys, Macy Gray and LL Cool J as performers.
- The Green Inaugural Ball, held on January 19, 2009, was hosted by former Vice President Al Gore at the National Portrait Gallery.
- EMILY's List Inaugural Luncheon, held on January 18, 2009, with appearances by Cabinet appointees Hillary Clinton and Janet Napolitano, Senators Kay Hagan of North Carolina and Jeanne Shaheen of New Hampshire and Governor Bev Perdue of North Carolina.
- Hip-Hop Inaugural Ball, held on January 19, 2009 at the Harman Center for the Arts, was hosted by the Hip-Hop Summit Action Network, Russell Simmons and LL Cool J, among others.
- Huffington Post Preinaugural Ball, held on January 19, 2009 at the Newseum, was hosted by Arianna Huffington, founder of the Huffington Post. Performances at the event featured Sting and will.i.am, with appearances by Tom Hanks, Steven Spielberg, Denzel Washington, Shakira, Jon Bon Jovi, Halle Berry and Ashton Kutcher.
- First Masonic Inauguration Ball, held on January 6, 2009 was hosted by the lodges of Freemasonry in Washington DC.
- The People's Inaugural Ball, also held on January 19, 2009, was hosted by Earl W. Stafford, a businessman from Fairfax County, Virginia. Stafford envisioned and created the ball as a celebration for economically and physically disadvantaged people from across the United States who would be otherwise unable to afford to attend the inaugural festivities. Stafford, through his family's Stafford Foundation, spent an estimated $1.6 million to bring to his guests to Washington, D.C., footing hotel expenses and throwing the actual ball. About 450 people were invited as guests for the gala, including 300 guests from around the United States and 150 from the local Washington, D.C. area. Invited guests included homeless individuals, people displaced by Hurricanes Katrina and Ike, and others who were nominated as worthy by relatives or organizations. Clothing, shoes, tuxedos and hotel rooms for attendees were provided as part of the invitation. The ball was held at the JW Marriott Hotel, located two blocks from the White House.
- Presidential Inaugural Luncheon and Fashion Show, held on January 18, 2009 at the Ritz-Carlton.
- The Voto Latino Inaugural Party, held on January 18, 2009 at Union Station in Washington, D.C., featured appearances by Marc Anthony, Rosario Dawson, Tony Plana and Wilmer Valderrama.

== Unofficial post-event balls ==
In addition to the official inaugural balls visited by President Obama and First Lady Michelle Obama to celebrate the inauguration, various other notable balls and gatherings were held on January 20, 2009 throughout Washington, D.C. and the surrounding region that featured an array of themes, including:

- Africa on the Potomac Inaugural Celebration held at Crystal Gateway Marriott in Arlington, Virginia.
- American Music Inaugural Ball held at the Marriott Wardman Park Hotel.
- BET Inaugural Ball held at the Mandarin Oriental Hotel.
- Blue Diamond Inaugural Ball held at the National Museum of Natural History (also referred to as the Health for All Blue Diamond Inaugural Ball
- Congressional Black Caucus Inaugural Ball held at the Capitol Hilton.
- Creative Coalition Inaugural Ball held at the Harman Center for the Arts.
- The George Washington University Inaugural Ball held at the Omni Shoreham Hotel.
- Human Rights Campaign's Equality Ball held at the Renaissance Mayflower Hotel.
- Impact Film Fund Ball.
- Inaugural Presidential Champagne Reception hosted by Keith Ridley, IV & National Association of Colored Women Clubs, Inc
- Inaugural Peace Ball held at the Smithsonian National Postal Museum.
- Inaugural Purple Ball held at the Fairmont Hotel.
- Recording Industry Association of America's Ball for Feeding America
- Salute to Heroes Inaugural Ball, sponsored by the American Legion to recognize recipients of the Medal of Honor. The ball was started as an inaugural event during President Dwight D. Eisenhower’s first inauguration in 1953. Obama was unable to attend this ball, making him the first president since Eisenhower to not attend. Vice President Joe Biden, however, did attend the ball, and was warmly received by the guests.
