= Georgia 300 =

Private U.S. railroad car

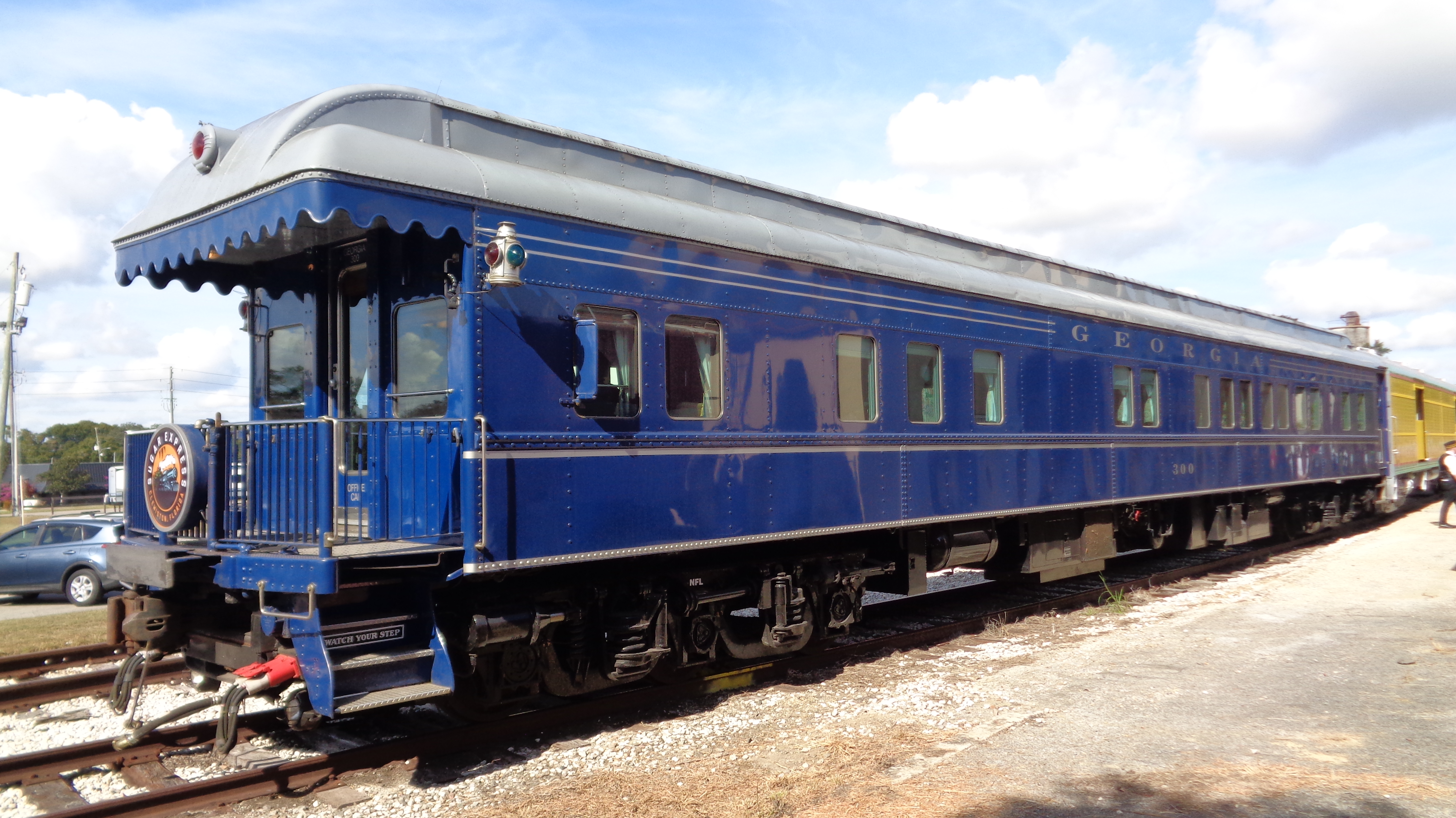
- The Georgia 300 in 2021
- Manufacturer: Pullman Company
- Order no.: Lot 6323
- Constructed: 1930
- Fleet numbers: 300

Specifications
- Track gauge: 1,435 mm (4 ft 8 1/2 in)

The Georgia 300 is a privately owned railroad car owned by John H. "Jack" Heard of Florida. It has been used by several recent presidents for various campaign related Whistle Stop Tours.

== History ==
Georgia 300 is a heavyweight observation car built by the Pullman Standard Co. shops in 1930. Sporting a Packard blue-with-silver striping livery, the train car operated as a lounge car named the General Polk on the New Orleans-New York Crescent Limited (operated by the L&N, West Point Route, Southern, and Pennsylvania). It was later purchased by the Georgia Railroad, reconfigured, and renamed Office Car 300. The Georgia Railroad used the car in trips to venues such as the Masters Tournament and the Kentucky Derby. It was retired in 1982, after the merger of Georgia Railroad and Family Lines rendered it surplus.

=== Private ownership ===
Heard, who owns a rail yard in Orange Park, Florida, purchased the car in 1985 and made a series of refurbishments in 1986, 1989, 1995, 2000 and 2008. The car has a dining room, an observation lounge, one master bedroom, two additional bedrooms, two bathrooms with showers, a section lounge, crew quarters, and kitchen. It is equipped for use on most Amtrak trains and other private venues.

In 2020, the car was loaned to U.S. Sugar Corporation, which used it in excursion service as part of their heritage Sugar Express tourist passenger train.

== U.S. presidents ==
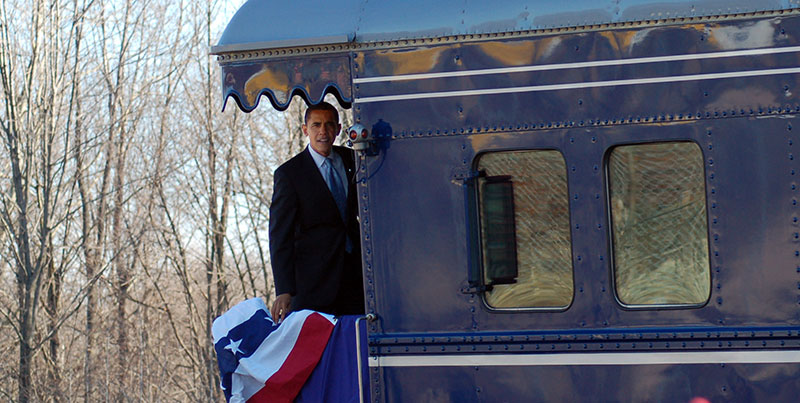
Barack Obama aboard the Georgia 300 on January 17, 2009

The Georgia 300 has hosted or carried Presidents George H. W. Bush, Bill Clinton, and Barack Obama. In 2004, Democratic presidential candidate John F. Kerry and running mate Sen. John Edwards, travelled aboard the car from St. Louis, Missouri, to Kingman, Arizona on the Believe In America Train Tour that followed the 2004 Democratic Convention in Boston.
