= Helmke =

Helmke is a German surname. Notable people with the surname include:

- Erika Helmke (1908–2002), German stage and film actress
- Hannes Helmke (born 1967), German sculptor
- Hendrik Helmke (born 1987), German footballer
- Paul Helmke (born 1948), American politician
- Till Helmke (born 1984), German sprinter
