= Auma Obama =

Kenyan-British activist, journalist and author

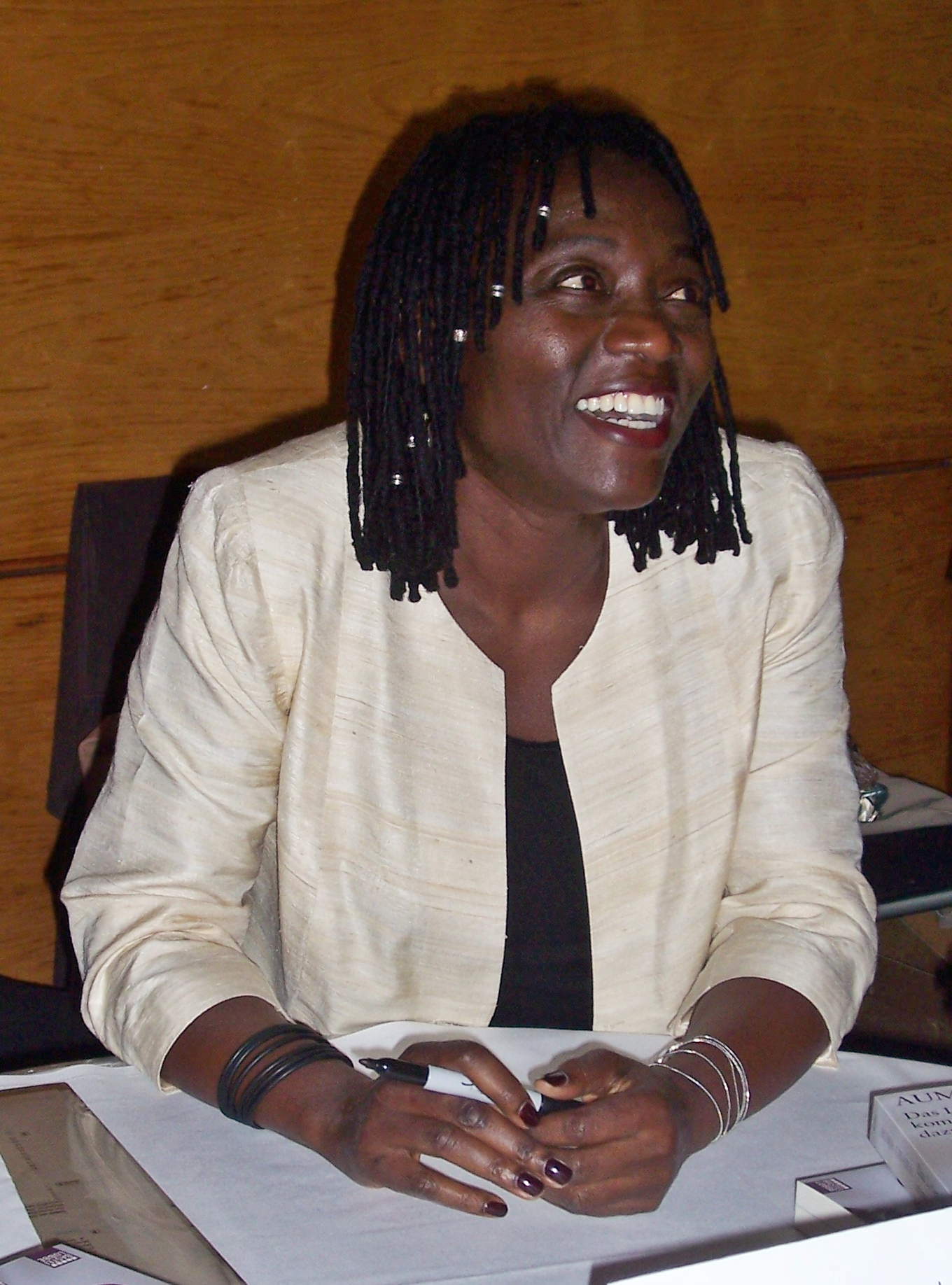
- Obama in 2012
- Born: Rita Auma Obama; June 1, 1960 (age 66); Nairobi, British Kenya
- Citizenship: Kenyan, British
- Education: Heidelberg University (BA); University of Bayreuth (PhD)
- Occupations: Community activist, sociologist, journalist, author
- Years active: 1980–present
- Known for: Community activism
- Spouse: Ian Manners (m. 1996; div. 2000)
- Children: 1
- Father: Barack Obama Sr.
- Relatives: Malik Obama (brother); Barack Obama (half-brother)
- Family: Obama family

Rita Auma Obama (born June 1, 1960) is a Kenyan-British community activist, sociologist, journalist, author, and half-sister of former President of the United States, Barack Obama. Obama serves as the executive chairwoman of Sauti Kuu Foundation (Strong Voices Foundation), a non-profit organisation that helps orphans and other young people struggling with poverty in Kenya.

== Background and education ==
Auma Obama is the daughter of Barack Obama Sr. and his first wife, Kezia Obama (née Aoko). She is the older half-sister of Barack Obama. After attending a local elementary school and The Kenya High School for secondary education (1973–1978), she secured a scholarship to attend university in Germany. She studied German at Heidelberg University from 1981 until 1987. After her graduation from Heidelberg, she went for graduate studies at the University of Bayreuth, graduating with a Doctor of Philosophy degree in 1996. She also studied at the German Film and Television Academy in Berlin. Obama's final project at the Film Academy was the twenty-minute film All That Glitters (1993), which blends genre conventions in depicting the vulnerability of Black lives in post-unification Germany.

== Humanitarian commitment ==
Obama lived in the United Kingdom after her studies. While there, she helped her mother, Kezia, to relocate from Kenya to the UK. Kezia was granted British citizenship in 2011.

In 1996, Obama married an Englishman, Ian Manners. They are the parents of Akinyi Manners (born 1997). Obama and Manners divorced in 2000. In 2007, Obama and Akinyi relocated to Kenya.

Obama worked for five years in Kenya with the international charity CARE International as the organization's East Africa Coordinator before starting her own charity, Sauti Kuu Foundation, sometimes referred to as Auma Obama Foundation.

In 2010, the Jacobs Foundation’s board of trustees has appointed her as a new member. This foundation (the 1st wealthiest Swiss charitable organization), with its registered office in Zürich, provides funding and support worldwide and has an annual funding budget amounting to approximately CHF 35 million ($33.66 million in 2010) for projects benefiting young people and their integration into society.

== Other considerations ==
Obama attended Barack Obama's, her half-brother's, inaugurations to the Senate and the presidency, in 2005 and 2009, respectively.

In 2011, Obama was interviewed for Turk Pipkin's documentary Building Hope and was the subject of a German documentary film The Education of Auma Obama. In 2017, Obama was honoured with the fourth International TÜV Rheinland Global Compact Award in Cologne. At the award ceremony, she received a specially made bronze sculpture Der Griff nach den Sternen (Reaching for the stars) by artist Hannes Helmke. Obama is the author of the book And Then Life Happens, released in 2012 by St. Martin's Press.

Obama is a member of the World Future Council. She is also a member of the board of trustees of the Germany Reading Foundation, as well as a member of the advisory board of the Bayreuth Academy of Advanced African Studies at the University of Bayreuth. She serves on the council of the Kilimanjaro Initiative in Nairobi. Since 2014, Dr. Obama has been the patron of the International Storymoja Festivals in Kenya. She is also the initiator of the Sauti Kuu Act Now Awards.

In 2021, she agreed to participate in the German dance show Let's Dance, the German version of Dancing with the Stars. She reached 5th place.
