= Zeituni Onyango =

Relative of Barack Obama (1952–2014)

- Born: May 29, 1952; Protectorate of Kenya
- Died: April 7, 2014 (aged 61); Boston, Massachusetts, U.S.
- Mother: Sarah Onyango Obama
- Relatives: Barack Obama (nephew)

Zeituni Onyango (/zeɪˈtʌni ɒnˈjɑːŋɡoʊ/ zay-TUN-ee on-YAHNG-goh; May 29, 1952 – April 7, 2014) was the half-aunt of United States President Barack Obama; she was born into the Luo tribe in Kenya. Born during the British rule of the Protectorate of Kenya, Onyango was the half-sister of Barack Obama Sr., father to the president. The younger Obama refers to her as "Aunti Zeituni" in his 1995 memoir, Dreams from My Father. In 2002 she applied for political asylum in the United States but was denied. She became notable when her case was leaked in the final days of the 2008 U.S. presidential campaign in which Barack Obama was the Democratic candidate, attracting international media attention.

In 2000, Onyango entered the United States on a temporary visa to accompany her son to college; she remained past its expiration date. In 2002 she sought political asylum in the United States, citing ethnic violence, as Kenya and East Africa had suffered an escalation in violence in the 2000s. Her case was denied in 2004. She remained in South Boston, Massachusetts, where she lived in public housing, and retained legal representation to try to gain asylum.

Her case highlighted "the hot-button topic of illegal immigration" in a presidential race that had avoided it, as well as contradictory rules governing eligibility for public housing in Massachusetts. The Massachusetts Department of Human Services investigated how her case was leaked. There was heightened federal administrative review on asylum deportations until after the 2008 general election. Onyango's case is often cited in light of immigration reform efforts of the Obama administration.

== Early life and family ==
Zeituni Onyango was born in 1952 into the Luo tribe in Kenya, daughter of Onyango Obama and his third wife Sarah Onyango Obama. She was a much younger half-sister to Barack Obama Sr., the son of their father's second wife. She was born during the British rule of the Protectorate of Kenya.

Onyango became educated and worked as a computer programmer at Kenya Breweries in Nairobi. In 1988, she met her American half-nephew, Barack Obama, during his first trip to Kenya at the age of 27. He was meeting with his father's side of his family for the first time. His parents had separated when Obama was two, and his time afterward with his father was limited to a month's visit in Hawaii when the boy was 10. Barack Obama Sr. remarried in Kenya and fathered about six children; he died in 1982. Obama's trip to Kenya was to meet and learn more about the many members of the paternal side of his family.

At the time, Onyango gave Obama perspective on his father and his achievements, noting that, when Barack Sr. left Kenya for Hawaii in 1959 to go to college, he was the first in the family to travel by airplane and to study abroad. She also provided details about the complicated extended family from his father's four marriages (two of which were polygamous). Barack Obama Sr. fathered six sons and a daughter in addition to Obama. As of 2010, all but one live in Britain or the United States; Mark Obama Ndesandjo lives in China. After returning to Kenya with a master's degree from Harvard University, Barack Sr. became an economist in the government. He eventually rose to become senior economist in the Kenyan Ministry of Finance before political conflict with President Kenyatta destroyed his career. In his memoir Dreams from My Father (1995), Barack Obama wrote about his journey to Kenya, including meeting Onyango, whom he called "Aunti Zeituni".

=== United States immigration status ===
Onyango visited the United States multiple times since 1975, returning to Kenya each time until the 2000s. She entered the US on a temporary visa in 2000 together with her son, who had been accepted at a college in Boston. Commercial databases show she received a Social Security card in 2001, indicating she had legal status as an immigrant at that time.

By 2002, Onyango had already applied for political asylum when she applied for public housing in Boston. She moved into the apartment, run by Massachusetts authorities, after back surgery made walking difficult. A Boston Housing Authority official said that the agency was never notified that a deportation order had been issued against Onyango after the government denied her request for asylum. William McGonigle, deputy director of the Boston Housing Authority, said, "We have no affirmative responsibility I am aware of to further check on their [applicants'] status after they are initially deemed to be eligible."(A 1977 federal consent decree, resulting from a class action lawsuit in Waltham, prohibits state officials from denying public housing to illegal immigrants).

Beginning in 2003, Onyango lived in a South Boston public housing project, according to Boston Public Housing Authority (BHA) officials. William McGonigle said she served as a public health advocate on behalf of the BHA. Described as a frail woman who walked with a cane, Onyango had been granted a flat normally set aside for people facing physical hardship. As of 2008 Onyango worked as a volunteer computer systems co-ordinator for the Experience Corps, a program in which adults over age 55 mentor children in their communities.

Margaret Wong, Onyango's immigration lawyer since 2008, said at the time the story broke that Onyango could be barred from reentering the US for up to ten years if she left the country. Wong said that Onyango needed to stay for medical care because she could not walk.

In 2010 Onyango was granted political asylum. Interviewed in September 2010 following this action, she described having lived in a homeless shelter for two years in Boston while waiting for her public housing apartment. She said that she received disability checks of up to $700 a month. She did not apologize for overstaying her visa.

"I don't mind," she said. "You can take that house. I can be on the streets with homeless people. I didn't ask for it. They gave it to me. Ask your system. I didn't create it or vote for it. Go and ask your system."

— Zeituni Onyango, WBZ-TV, September 21, 2010, reported and quoted from the WBZ-TV interview

=== Political background in Kenya ===
In 2002 Onyango applied for political asylum in the United States citing violence in Kenya; a federal immigration judge eventually rejected the request and instructed her to leave the country. Joan Friedland, a lawyer and immigration policy director at the National Immigration Law Center in Washington, noted that even when an immigration judge makes such a decision, other options exist for an asylum claimant.

Onyango, along with other Obama family members, was born into the Luo tribe, Kenya's third-largest (12%) ethnic group. Kenya had longstanding "ethnic tension between the Luo and Kikuyu"; the Kikuyu are the most populous tribe, accounting for approximately 22% of the country's people.

Some of the tensions between the Luo and the Kikuyu date to the mid-1960s post-independence period, when a bitter falling out between President Jomo Kenyatta (a Kikuyu) and his Vice President Jaramogi Odinga (a Luo) resulted in a "sustained political persecution of the Luo." The Luo are considered one of Kenya's most marginalised groups.

In 2002 the National Rainbow Coalition won political control of Kenya, but the country remained politically unstable. Electoral manipulation was alleged, and it was widely confirmed by international observers in the 2007 elections. The political fallout from the 2007 election resulted in a country-wide economic and humanitarian crisis extending into 2008. Throughout the 2000s, there had been widespread ethnic violence in Kenya and East Africa, including killings, and the displacement of hundreds of thousands of people by 2008.

Raila Odinga, Kenya's prime minister and former opposition leader in 2008, is also of the Luo tribe. The son of Jaramogi Odinga, he claims to be a cousin of Barack Obama. In 2008 Odinga served as Prime Minister of Kenya with president Mwai Kibaki, a Kikuyu, in a coalition government.

The American Prospect noted in 2008 that Onyango risked being persecuted and tortured in Kenya if she returned, and said that risk to her family members had increased, whether or not she was deported, because of her asylum case having been leaked and widely publicized internationally. They also noted that due to the heightened danger in Kenya, her asylum claim in the US was bolstered. After her case was revealed in international media, Onyango traveled to stay with unidentified friends in Cleveland, Ohio. She had felt threatened in Boston, as people called and knocking on her door at all hours. The Boston police said that there was a problem with curiosity seekers and paparazzi.

== Immigration status ==
Onyango's immigration status became the subject of widespread international media attention in the final week of the 2008 U.S. presidential election, in which her half-nephew Obama was the Democratic candidate. Based on anonymous government sources, Associated Press reported that Onyango was living in the United States without valid immigration status; she had been asked to leave in 2004 after her request for asylum was denied by an immigration judge. Although such an order from a judge can be appealed, it was unknown if Onyango had appealed the order. Onyango's case resulted in a special nationwide directive within Immigration and Customs Enforcement (ICE) requiring any deportations to be approved at the level of ICE regional directors before the U.S presidential election. In discussing Onyango's case, various media outlets discussed some of the issues of immigrants, including political asylum cases.

Putting Onyango's case in perspective, MSNBC's Domenico Montanaro noted at the time that thousands of people live for years in the US after receiving deportation orders. "Fugitive apprehension teams usually target suspects with criminal records before they go after simple immigration violators". Of an estimated ten million illegal immigrants, The Washington Post noted that an estimated 550,000 persons who have been denied asylum continue to reside in the United States.

Onyango was granted a waiver of deportation on May 17, 2010, by the United States, and became a legal resident. Immigration Judge Leonard I. Shapiro granted Zeituni Onyango, her lawyers Margaret Wong and Scott Bratton, and her two doctors an extended hearing that lasted five hours. At the end, Shapiro granted her legal residency and permission to work in the United States.

=== Political donation ===
Onyango donated money to her nephew's 2008 presidential campaign, but these were considered illegal under US law. Foreign citizens or immigrants without green cards may not make political donations. The campaign said they would return her donations, regardless of her status, to avoid any appearance of wrongdoing.

=== Legality regarding release of information ===
The Washington Post noted federal privacy law restricts the Department of Homeland Security (DHS) from disclosing information about citizens and permanent residents, and DHS policy limits disclosures about an immigrant's status. Asylum seekers are granted greater protection from release of information to the public, because of the sensitive nature of their claims and the risks of retaliation. A spokeswoman for U.S. Immigration and Customs Enforcement (ICE) said the Onyango case had been referred to the agency's Office of Professional Responsibility and its parent department's inspector general for investigation of the leak. "They are looking into whether there was a violation of policy in publicly disclosing individual case information", ICE spokeswoman Kelly Nantel said. "We can't comment on individual cases."

== Publications ==
- Onyango, Zeituni (March 25, 2012). Tears of Abuse: Her Story of Struggle and Triumph. Bedford Heights, Ohio: Afripress Publishing Holding, Ltd. ISBN 978-0615617190. (Autobiography)
- Onyango, Zeituni. "Tears of Abuse". Promotional site for "Auntie" Zeituni Onyango's autobiography, with photo gallery and purchase information. Archived from the original on December 16, 2014.

== Death ==
Onyango died at a care home on April 7, 2014, in Boston, Massachusetts. She had breast cancer and a respiratory ailment.

== See also ==
- History of laws concerning immigration and naturalization in the United States
- Illegal immigrant population of the United States
- Immigration to the United States
