= Margaret W. Wong =

American lawyer

Margaret W. Wong Esq.
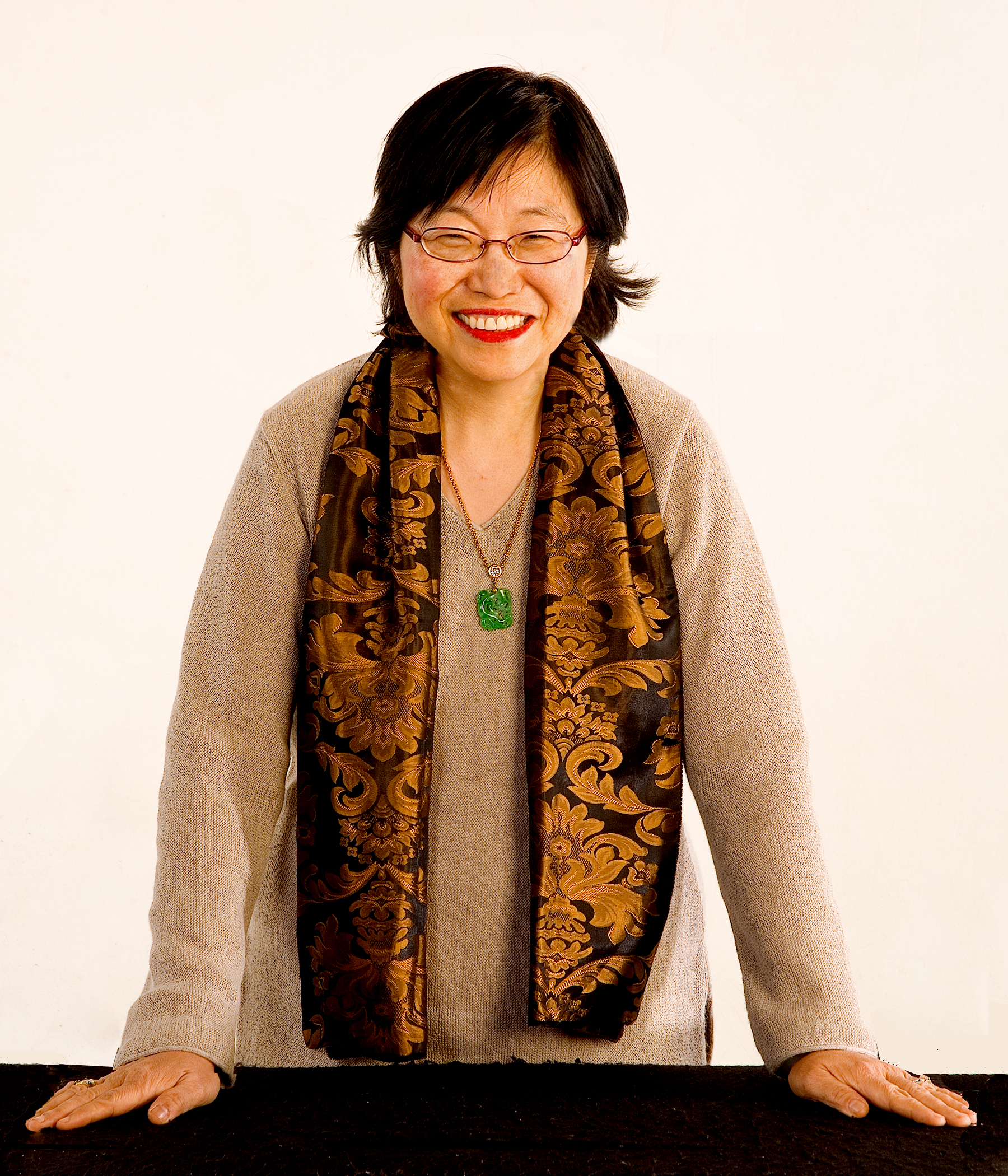
- Born: Margaret Wai Wong; July 27, 1950 (age 75); Hong Kong
- Occupation: immigration attorney
- Known for: Legal representation of Zeituni Onyango and Onyango Obama, both relatives of Barack Obama

Margaret W. Wong
- Traditional Chinese: 黃唯
- Simplified Chinese: 黄唯
Transcriptions
Standard Mandarin
- Hanyu Pinyin: Huáng Wéi
- Wade–Giles: Huang^{2} Wei^{2}
Yue: Cantonese
- Jyutping: Wong^{4} Wai^{4}

Margaret Wai Wong (Chinese: 黃唯, July 27, 1950 in Hong Kong) is a naturalized American immigration lawyer who created an immigration and nationality law practice in 1978, of which she is senior and managing partner.

== Early life and career ==
She is the eldest child of Hwang Mien Lin, Hong Kong newspaper publisher and Kuan Kuo Hua. She faced the prospect of training to be an artist or a teacher if she continued her education in Hong Kong. Desiring to study medicine, she moved to the United States in 1969 on a student visa, and entered junior college at Ottumwa Heights College, in Ottumwa, Iowa on scholarship. She earned bachelor's degrees in biology and chemistry at Western Illinois University in Macomb, Illinois in 1973, on full scholarship.

Intending to study medicine, Wong weighed her educational options, and seeing she'd be in school for law only three years, and for medicine many more, she decided to pursue law. She earned her J.D. in 1976 at University at Buffalo Law School, also on full scholarship. Wanting to remain in the U.S. to practice law, she passed the bar in the State of New York, and later in the State of Ohio.

After passing the bar in New York City, she was unable to find legal work. She took a temporary job as a legal and financial officer of the City of Buffalo, New York before moving to Cleveland, Ohio, in 1977, to join Central National Bank as a credit analyst in their management trainee program. While working in Cleveland, she sought entrance to various law firms without success. So after a year with the bank, she opened her own law practice with a single administrative assistant. Recognizing her own need for legal immigration status, she started helping other foreign-born residents maintain their legal status, and work towards naturalization.

When she first started working in Cleveland, Wong noticed a plaza in Shaker Heights, Ohio, and thought it would be a great place to start a restaurant. She opened the Pearl of the Orient in January 1978. Wong asked her sister Rose to run Pearl of the Orient, and the restaurant became so successful, Wong opened a second location in 1984 in Rocky River, Ohio. Wong's brother George runs "Pearl West."

In 1982 she met Kam Hon Chan (April 23, 1949 – January 22, 2014), a pharmacist in Cleveland, and they wed January 3, 1983. They raised two children, Steven and Allison. Wong and Chan founded the Apothe-Care Pharmacy Group, which eventually grew to three Cleveland area pharmacies.

Wong is admitted to practice before the Fourth, Sixth, the District of Columbia Circuit U.S. Courts of Appeals, and the Northern District of Ohio U.S. District Court.

== Notable clients ==
Wong was Zeituni Onyango's attorney in her battle to remain in the United States and win asylum and a Green Card. Onyango, half-sister of President Barack Obama's late father, had her immigration case leaked to the press just prior to her nephew's 2008 presidential election. The immigration judge wrote in his decision that Onyango faced "great risk…" in her home country from those "…who oppose President Obama's politics and/or his ethnicity, which the Respondent shares…" and so should be granted asylum.

Wong and her law partner, Scott Eric Bratton, represented Onyango Obama who faced deportation, and helped him obtain asylum rights and a Green Card. Half uncle of President Barack Obama, Mr. Obama's status became an issue after a 2011 arrest.

== Notable cases ==
- Matter of Adamiak, 23 I&N Dec. 878 (BIA 2006)
- Mandebvu v. Holder, F.3d, (6th Cir June 18, 2014)(published)
- Singh v. Gonzales, 451 F.3d 400 (6th Cir. 2006)
- State v. Yahya, 2011-Ohio 06090 (Ohio App.10th Dist. 2011)

== Publications ==
- Wong, Esq., Margaret W. (December 5, 2009). The Immigrant's Way: For All Immigrants, By an Immigrant. New York, NY: ILW.com, American Immigration, LLC.
- Wong, Esq., Margaret W. (2012). 移民之道 – The Immigrant's Way: For All Immigrants, By an Immigrant. Beijing, PRC: China Renmin University Press Co. (Chinese Edition)
- Wong, Margaret W.; Bratton, Scott; Pinjuh, Lori; Fungsang, Francis (2010). "Why Immigration Reform is Critical" (PDF). Albany Government Law Review. 3 (1). Albany Law School: 57–102. Archived from the original (PDF) on 4 March 2016.

== Philanthropy ==
Inspired by the scholarships she enjoyed in college and law school, Wong is devoted to contributing to the success of her community:

- Having pledged $850,000 to her law school alma mater, in 2012, Wong increased her pledge to $1.5 million, half of which would fund scholarships, and the other half to endow a professorship in immigration law. $1 million would be paid over ten years, and the remaining half-million dollars was a pledged planned giving gift from her estate.
- Wong created a $100,000 scholarship at Cuyahoga Community College in Cleveland, Ohio, in 2011.
- Wong established the "Margaret W. Wong Endowed Forum on Foreign Born Individuals of Distinction" at the City Club of Cleveland.
- She has sponsored numerous organizations such as Global Cleveland and the Cleveland Orchestra, and has made many additional pledges of planned giving bequests, including to the Notre Dame College, for which she serves as a trustee, and is a member of their Marian Legacy Society.
- Wong has pledged significant legacy gifts to the Cleveland Metropolitan Bar Foundation, and the Ohio State Bar Foundation.

== Awards ==
- AABA Catalyst Award from NAPABA, 2014
- International Service Award, Rotary Club of Cleveland, 2014
- Jaeckle Award, University at Buffalo Law School, 2013
- Ohio Women's Hall of Fame, 2000
- Trailblazer Award, the National Asian Pacific American Bar Association (NAPABA), 1999
- Ellis Island Medal of Honor, 1998
- YWCA Woman of Achievement Award, 1997
- Glamour Outstanding Working Women, 1983
