= Malik Obama =

Barack Obama's half-brother

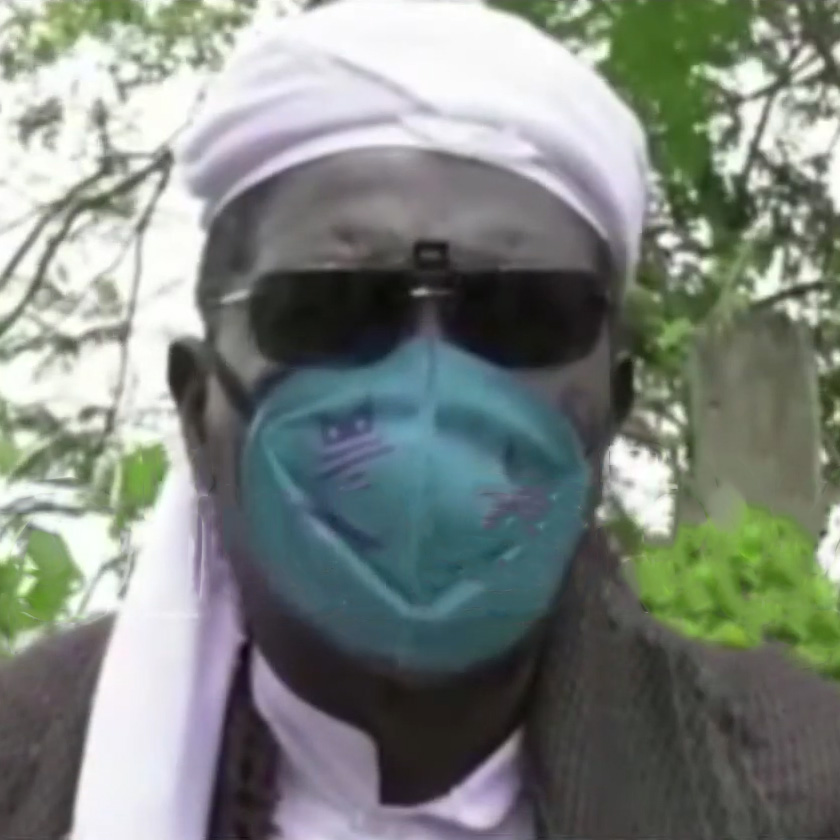
- Malik Obama in April 2021
- Born: Abon'go Malik Obama; March 17, 1958 (age 68); Nairobi, British Kenya (present-day Kenya)
- Other name: Roy
- Citizenship: Kenya; United States
- Education: University of Nairobi
- Occupations: Businessperson, former political candidate
- Known for: Former President Barack Obama's half-brother
- Political party: Republican (since 2016)
- Father: Barack Obama Sr.
- Relatives: Auma Obama (sister); Barack Obama (half-brother)
- Family: Obama family

Abon'go Malik "Roy" Obama (born March 17, 1958) is a Kenyan-American businessman and former political candidate known for being the paternal half-brother of former President of the United States, Barack Obama, and the eldest son of economist Barack Obama Sr.

== Biography ==
Abon'go Malik "Roy" Obama was born and raised in Nairobi, Kenya. His parents are economist Barack Obama Sr. and his first wife, Kezia Obama (née Nyandega). Obama earned a degree in accounting from the University of Nairobi. He met his younger half-brother, Barack Obama, for the first time in 1985, when Barack flew from Chicago to Washington, D.C., to visit Malik. According to him, the two each served as best man at the other's wedding. Barack brought his wife, Michelle Obama, to Kenya three years later, seeing Malik again while meeting many other relatives for the first time. Malik Obama is Muslim.

Malik Obama lives in the Obamas' ancestral home, Nyang'oma Kogelo, a village of several hundred people, preferring its slow pace to that of the city. Until 2004, he ran a small electronics shop a half-hour's drive away in another town. Since 2008, Obama has run the Barack H. Obama Foundation, founded in memory of his father, Barack Obama Sr.

Obama is a dual citizen of both Kenya and the United States. He is a frequent visitor to the United States, and works as a consultant in Washington, D.C., for several months each year. He was registered to vote in Maryland as of 2016.

== Political candidacy and advocacy ==
During his half brother's 2008 presidential campaign, Malik Obama was a spokesman for the extended Obama family in Kenya. He dealt with safety and privacy concerns arising from the increased attention from the press. In early 2013, Obama ran for governor of the Kenyan county of Siaya. His campaign slogan was "Obama here, Obama there" in reference to his half-brother who was serving his second term as the President of the United States. Obama garnered 2,814 of the 281,663 (1.0%) votes cast.

Prior to the 2016 United States presidential election, Obama stated that he supported Donald Trump, the candidate for the Republican Party. He attended the third presidential debate as one of Trump's guests. On June 12, 2020, Malik Obama reportedly endorsed Donald Trump’s re-election and later in the week posted a false birth certificate of Barack Obama. The certificate alleges that Barack was born in the Republic of Kenya in 1961, despite the Republic of Kenya not being founded until 1964. The faux Kenyan certificate also contained a seal which read South Australia. Since then, he has consistently taken to news sites to express critical opinions about his half-brother, alleging that he made a pact with the Devil.
