= Marian Robinson =

Mother of Michelle Obama (1937–2024)

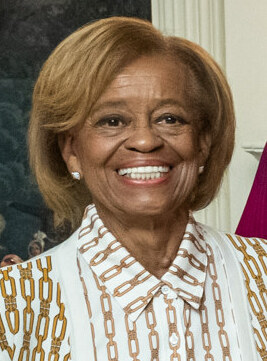
- Robinson in 2022
- Born: Marian Lois Shields; July 30, 1937; Chicago, Illinois, U.S.
- Died: May 31, 2024 (aged 86); Chicago, Illinois, U.S.
- Resting place: Lincoln Cemetery, Blue Island, Illinois, U.S.
- Citizenship: US
- Known for: Mother of Michelle Obama
- Spouse: Fraser C. Robinson III (m. 1960; died 1991)
- Children: Craig; Michelle
- Relatives: Barack Obama (son-in-law)

Marian Lois Robinson (née Shields; July 30, 1937 – May 31, 2024) was the mother of Michelle Obama, the former first lady of the United States, and Craig Robinson, a basketball executive. She was the mother-in-law of Barack Obama, the 44th president of the United States. She worked as a secretary and executive assistant before and after raising her children with her husband, Fraser Robinson, in Chicago. In retirement, she moved to the White House during her son-in-law's presidency, where she helped raise her grandchildren.

== Ancestry and early life ==
Marian Lois Shields was born in Chicago on July 30, 1937, the fourth of seven siblings; five sisters, followed by two brothers, born to Purnell Nathaniel Shields, a house painter and carpenter, and his wife Rebecca Jumper, a licensed practical nurse. Her parents later separated. Both parents had multi-racial ancestry. Her father's grandfather, Dolphus T. Shields (c. 1860–1950), was a descendant of slavery, with his mother a slave and his white father the heir of the slaveowner; he had moved from rural Georgia to Birmingham, Alabama, where he established his own carpentry and tool sharpening business. His descendants moved to Chicago during the Great Migration. Marian Shields's own formal education ended with attending two years of teachers college in Chicago, and she stressed the importance of education to her children.

== Personal life ==
Shields married Fraser Robinson III on October 27, 1960, in Chicago. They had two children together, Craig Malcolm and Michelle LaVaughn, named after Fraser's mother. Fraser died from multiple sclerosis in 1991.

Robinson worked as a secretary for mail-order retailer Spiegel, the University of Chicago, and a bank. In the late 1960s, Shields lived with her family in a rented second floor apartment of a brick bungalow the South Side of Chicago that belonged to her aunt Robbie and her husband Terry. This is where she raised her two children, Michelle and Craig, and continued to live until she moved to the White House with the Obamas. Michelle Obama, in her 2018 memoir Becoming, describes her mother's strong attachment to her Chicago home and her commitment to raising her children as a stay at home mother. Shields resumed work as an executive assistant at a bank when her daughter Michelle started high school.

== Death ==
Robinson died in Chicago on May 31, 2024, at the age of 86. In a joint statement, Michelle and Barack said that she "had a way of summing up the truths about life in a word or two, maybe a quick phrase that made everyone around her stop and think" and that "In our sadness, we are lifted up by the extraordinary gift of her life. And we will spend the rest of ours trying to live up to her example." In addition to family and others, First Lady Jill Biden, who had known Robinson, attended Robinson's memorial service at the South Shore Cultural Center, where Barack Obama gave the eulogy.

== Relationship with Michelle Obama ==
Michelle described her mother as forthright and honest, and spoke of her implacability and her silent support as a child and beyond. Robinson used to take her daughter Michelle to the library long before she started school and used to sit beside her as she learned to read and write. Usually the kind of mother who expected her children to settle their own disputes, Robinson was quick to see real distress and stepped in to help when needed. For example, when Michelle was in second grade and was distressed because of being devalued by a teacher, Robinson advocated for her and was instrumental in getting her daughter better learning opportunities at school. Robinson encouraged her children to communicate with her about all subjects by being available when needed and giving practical advice. She entertained Michelle's school friends when they visited and enabled her to make her own choices in important matters.

== Obama campaign and life in the White House ==
While Michelle and Barack Obama campaigned for his candidacy for president in 2008, Robinson helped them by providing support to her granddaughters, Malia and Sasha Obama. During former President Barack Obama's two-term presidency, Robinson lived at the White House with the First Family. She had to be persuaded to leave her home in Chicago but ultimately agreed to come on a "temporary basis". Although she participated in several public events, and took her first trips outside the United States during the White House years, she was able to keep a low profile, and move comparatively freely around Washington practically unnoticed, much to the envy of her daughter. An exhibit hall at the Obama Presidential Center is planned to be named in her honor.
