= Spiekeroog =

- Municipality
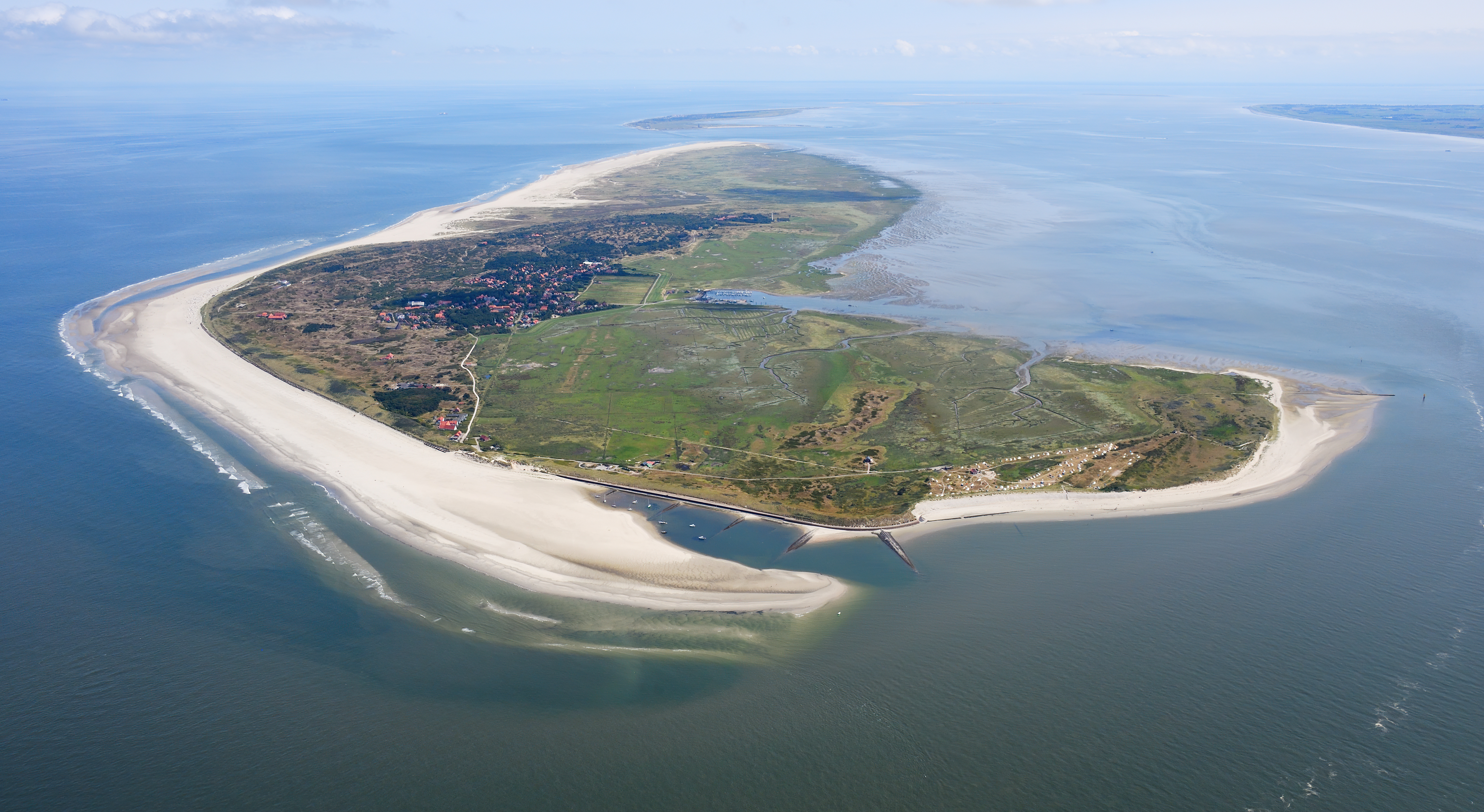
- Aerial view of Spiekeroog from the west

- Flag Coat of arms

- Location of Spiekeroog within Wittmund district
- Interactive map of Spiekeroog
- Location within Germany Location within Lower Saxony
- Coordinates: 53°46′19″N 7°41′49″E
- Country: Germany
- State: Lower Saxony
- District: Wittmund

Government
  - Mayor (2021–26): Patrick Kösters

Area
  - Total: 18.25 km^{2} (7.05 sq mi)
- Elevation: 3 m (9.8 ft)

Population (2025-12-31)
  - Total: 648
  - Density: 35.5/km^{2} (92.0/sq mi)
- Time zone: UTC+01:00 (CET)
  - Summer (DST): UTC+02:00 (CEST)
- Postal codes: 26474
- Dialling codes: 0 49 76
- Vehicle registration: WTM
- Website: www.spiekeroog.de

Spiekeroog (German pronunciation: [ˈʃpiːkɐˌʔoːk]) is one of the East Frisian Islands, off the North Sea coast of Germany. It is situated between Langeoog to its west and Wangerooge to its east. The island belongs to the district of Wittmund, in Lower Saxony in Germany. The only village on the island is also called Spiekeroog. The island is part of the Wadden Sea World Heritage Site by the UNESCO and the Lower Saxon Wadden Sea National Park.

Spiekeroog covers an area of 18.25 km^{2}, the shortest distance to the mainland is 5.7 km. The island is, with the exception of electric mini cars and fire and rescue vehicles, free of cars. A daily ferry service from the harbour of Neuharlingersiel connects the island with the German mainland. The island is separated from neighbouring Wangerooge by a gat known as the Harle.

The origin of the name "Spiekeroog" is disputed. Today, most of its people tend to believe that it is a translation of "storage island."

== History ==
"S" flag of Spiekeroog

Spiekeroog was first mentioned in 1398 as the island of Spiekeroch. At that time, it was a hiding place for pirates. They were supported by the islanders, but were not averse to robbing them too.

In 1625, 13 families lived on the island, making a living from farming, fishing and the production of muschelkalk or shell-bearing limestone. In later years, whaling and shipping became increasingly important to the island. During the Napoleonic occupation, shipping came to a halt due to the blockade against England which led to great poverty. Smuggling goods to and from the then English Heligoland was the only source of income during that time. In 1812, England attacked the French settlements on the island, but was repelled.

At the beginning of the 19th century, the idea of coastal resorts—having originated in England—became popular among the German North Sea islands. The first coastal resort was founded 1797 on the island of Norderney. Since 1820, guests have been using Spiekeroog for holidays. A weekly ferry service was established from Neuharlingersiel in 1792 and, since 1842, the service has operated on a daily basis. To improve the comfort of tourists and guests, a 1.7 km long horse-drawn railway was built in 1885 between the village and the western beach. It was extended in 1892 to the newly built harbour in the southwest of the island. This horse-drawn railway was replaced by diesel trains on May, 31st, 1949 which made it the last horse-drawn railway in Germany. In 1981, upon construction of the new harbour, the diesel train was put out of service. At the same time, the horse-drawn railway was reinstated for tourists and continues to operate to this day.

== Tourism ==
Spiekeroog was a frequent vacation destination for various German presidents. Gustav Heinemann, Richard von Weizsäcker and Johannes Rau (who got married on the island) spent their holidays here.

As a North Sea coastal resort the island is home to various health institutions including a wellness centre, a mother/child health centre and an island spa. Spiekeroog has a capacity of 3,500 beds for guests - counting all hotels, pensions, private rooms, vacation apartments and health and leisure centres. According to a 2003 survey, 64,000 tourists visit the island yearly, with 554,000 overnight stays and 81,000 daytime visitors. The average stay on the island is 5.8 days.

Beside hotels, pensions and vacation apartments, there is a campsite on the western part of the island. It is open from May to September.

== Places of interest ==
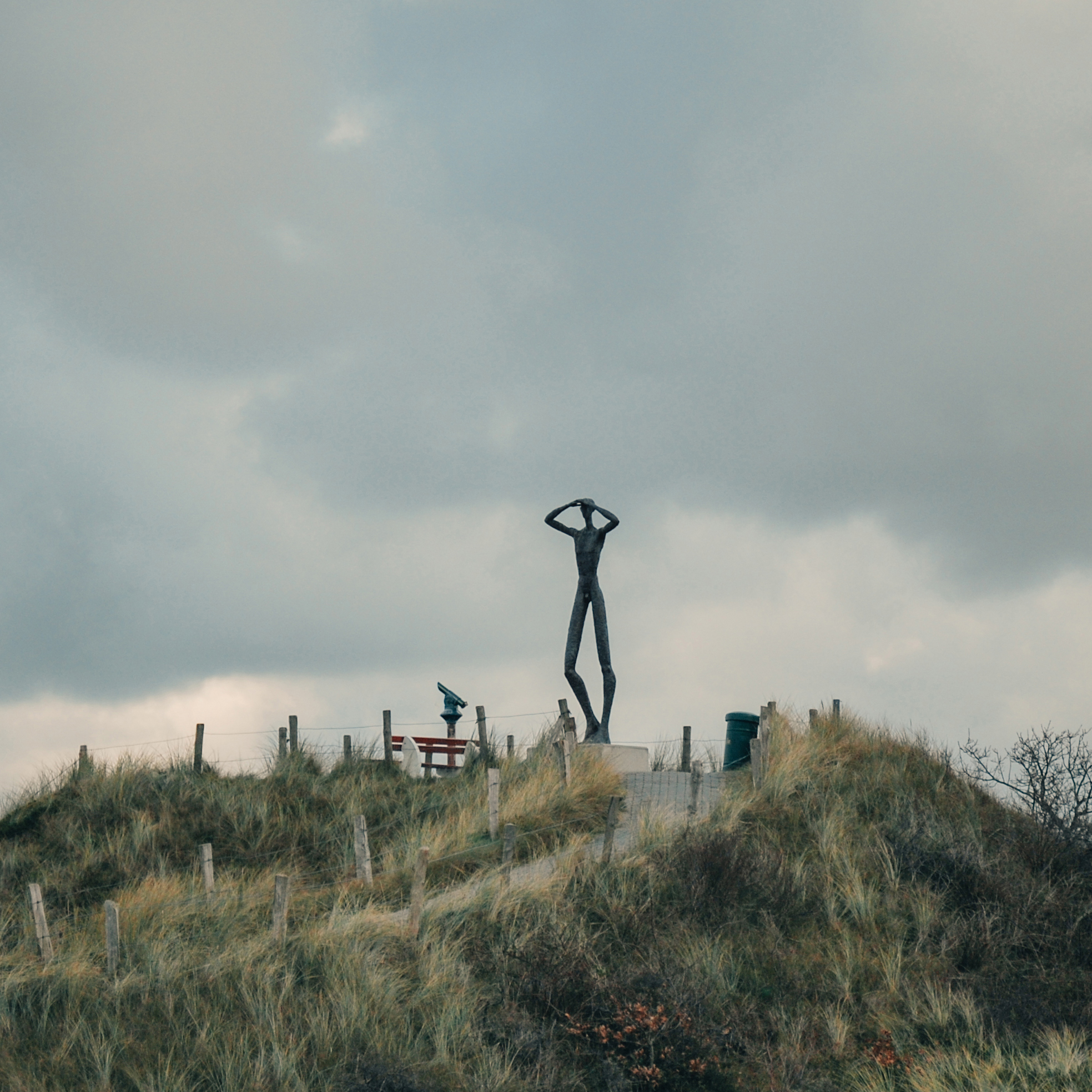
"De Utkieker" on Spiekeroog

The "Old Island Church" (Protestant) was built in 1696 and is therefore the oldest of all the churches on the East Frisian Islands. The portrait of the Virgin Mary within the church is supposed to have come from a ship of the Spanish Armada that was stranded on Spiekeroog in 1588.

Drinkeldodenkarkhof, also known as "Cemetery of the Homeless", is the graveyard for the 84 victims from the sinking of the ship Johanne in 1854.

The Island Museum shows historical artefacts from the island, the development of the coastal resort and the nature on the island.

The Shell Museum at Kogge House has an exhibition of 2000 shells from all over the world.

Since 2007 the Bronze sculpture „De Utkieker“ (Height 3,50 m) by the German sculptor Hannes Helmke is standing on a dune, looking over the sea. It is a symbol for preserving the island as a natural jewel.

The National Park Center Wittbülten is situated at two kilometres East from Spiekeroog village, surrounded by sand dunes and salt marshes covered with Sea Lavender. The exhibition displays a Sperm Whale skeleton and many interactive and multimedial objects explaining the island's habitats.

The tidal flats tours are other of the main attractions of the island.

From April to September (depending on holiday times), a horse-drawn railway operates between the old railway station and Westend and the campig site.

== See also ==
- List of ferry boats of the East Frisian Islands
