= The Education of Auma Obama =

2011 German documentary

The Education of Auma Obama is a 2011 German documentary on the life of Barack Obama's half-sister Auma Obama. It won the Best Diaspora Documentary Award at the Africa Movie Academy Awards. It was directed by Branwen Okpako.
