= Nyang'oma Kogelo =

Nyang'oma Kogelo Kogelo
- Location within Kenya
- Coordinates: 0°0′38″S 34°20′44″E
- Country: Kenya
- County: Siaya County

Government
  - Chief: James Ojwang' Obalo
- Elevation: 4,227 ft (1,288 m)

Population
  - Total: 3,648
- Website: www.kogelo.co.ke

Nyang'oma Kogelo, also known as Kogelo, is a village in Siaya County, Kenya. It is located near the equator, 60 kilometres (37 mi) west-northwest of Kisumu, the provincial capital of the former Nyanza province. The population of Nyangoma-Kogelo is 3,648.

== Services ==
Nyang'oma Kogelo is a typical rural Kenyan village with most residents relying on small-scale farming as their main source of income. The village has a commercial centre with various shops and a bar offering shopping and recreation to the populace. The village has a primary school (Senator Obama Primary School) and a high school (Senator Obama Secondary School). The land for both schools was donated by Barack Obama Sr., a native of the village, and they were renamed in 2006 after his son Barack, then a United States senator. There is also a health centre.

Prior to the 2008 US presidential election, the village had no electricity, but was connected to the national grid immediately following Obama's victory, owing to the consequent rise in interest in the village. The village also saw its first Kenya Police post set up in the wake of the election outcome.

The village is along the unpaved C28 road between Ng'iya and Ndori junctions. Less than 10 kilometres north of Kogelo, Ngiya is located along the Kisumu - Siaya road (C30 road). Nyang'oma Kogelo is part of South East Alego electoral ward of Siaya County Council and Alego Constituency. South East Alego is also an administrative location in the Karemo division of Siaya district. The location has a population of 17,294. As of 2008, the chief of the location was James Ojwang' Obalo, whose office is located next to the Nyang'oma Kogelo shopping centre.

== History ==
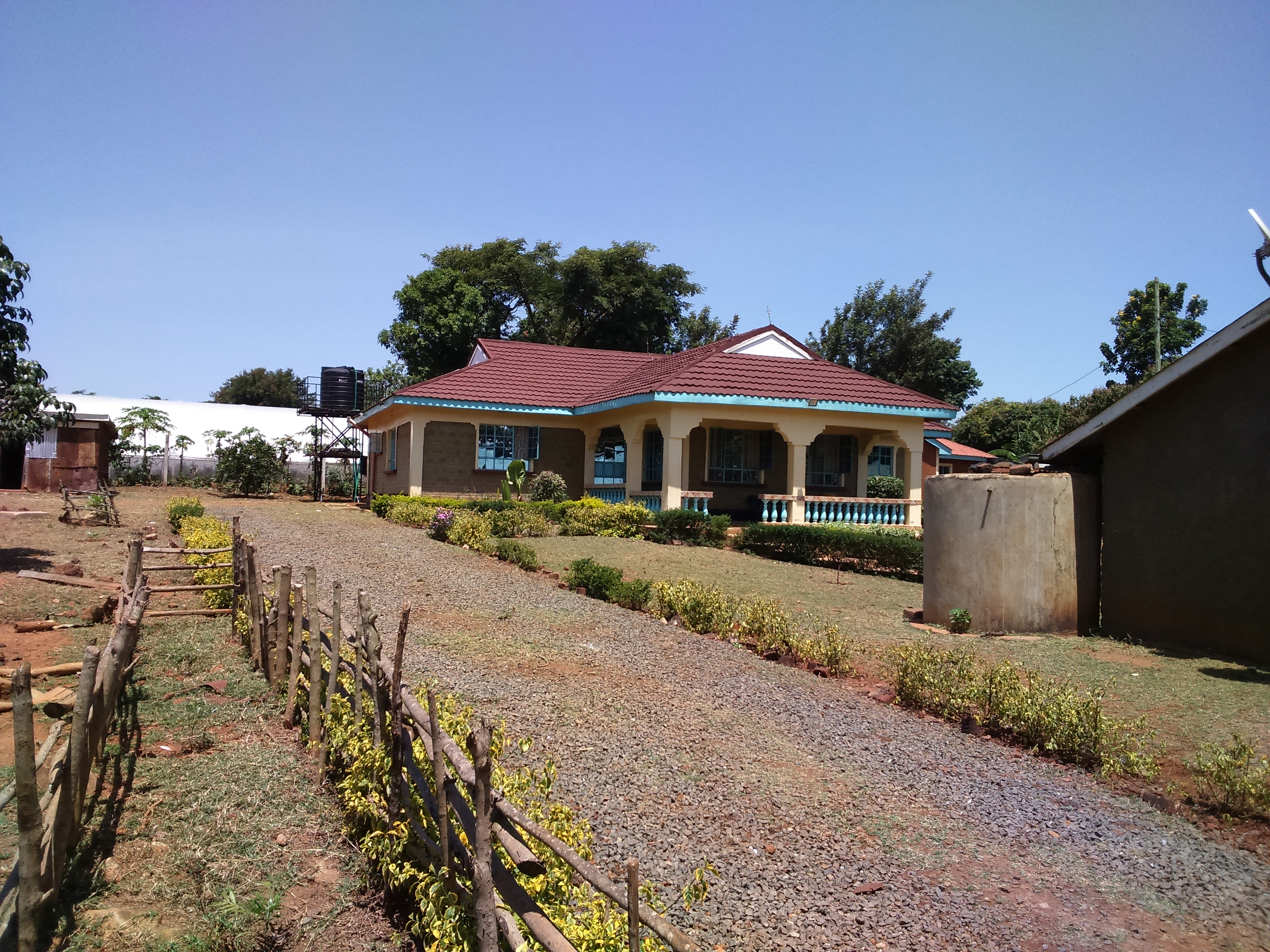
The home of Sarah Onyango Obama in Nyang'oma Kogelo

Nyang'oma Kogelo is the ancestral home of the family of Barack Obama, the 44th president of the United States. They have resided in the village since colonial times.

Since 2006, the village has received international attention because it is the hometown of Barack Obama Sr., the father of former United States President Barack Obama. Barack Obama Sr. is buried in the village. His paternal step-grandmother Sarah Onyango Obama lived there until her death in March 2021, and she was also buried in the village. In 2009, the Nyang'oma Seventh-day Adventist Church was involved in the attempted conversion of Barack Obama's step-grandmother, Sarah Obama, to Christianity. Following counsel from her family, she opted out of the arranged public conversion and baptism and remained a Muslim.

Because of its connection with the former American president, the village is promoted as a tourist attraction of western Kenya. An Obama-themed museum was built by the Kenyan government and opened in the village in 2009. That year, the village was designated as a protected area under Kenya's National Museums and Heritage Act. Barack Obama visited the village in July 2018.
