= Barack Obama Sr. =

Kenyan economist (1934–1982)

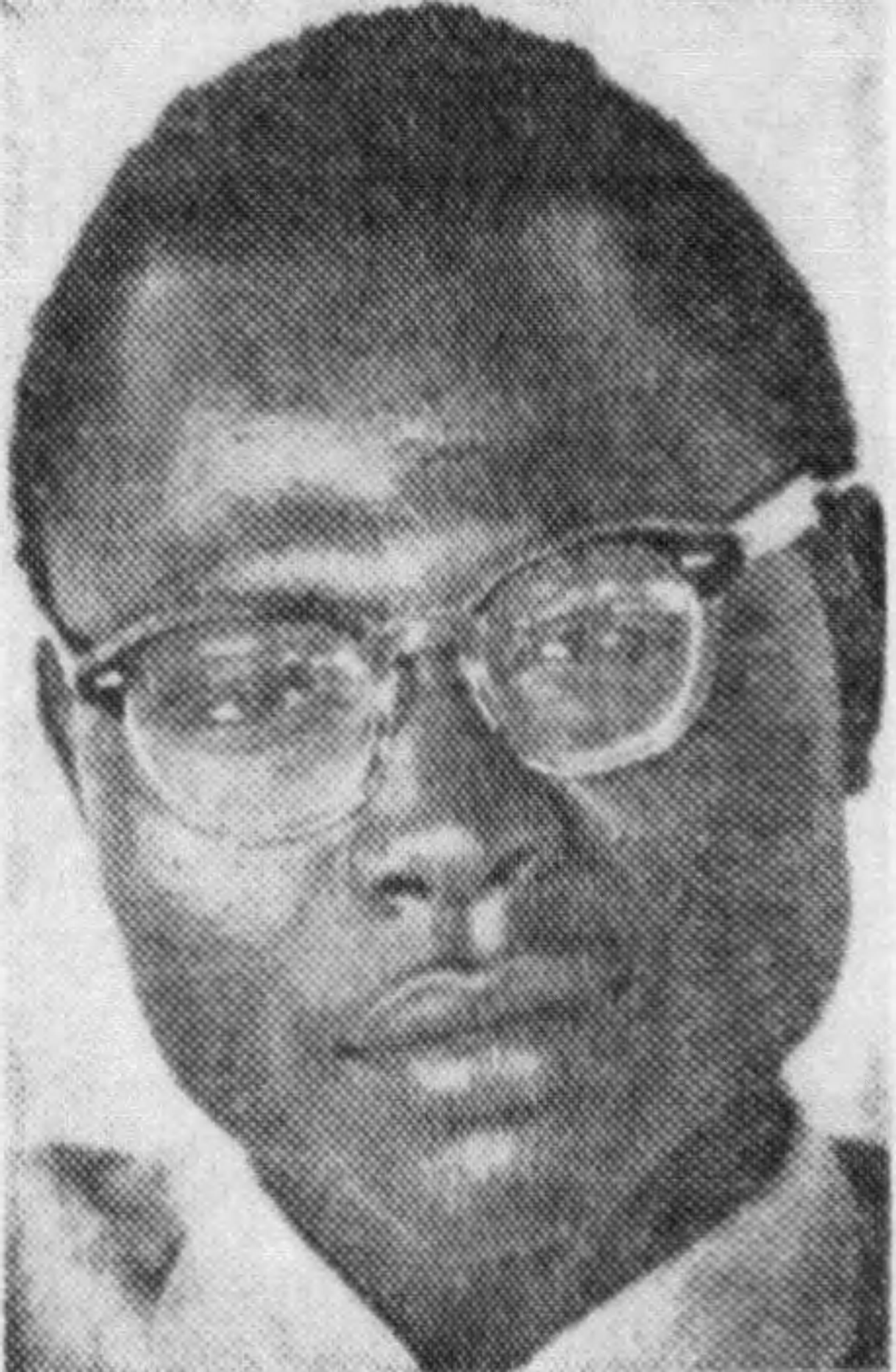
- Obama in 1962
- Born: Baraka Hussein Obama; 18 June 1934; Rachuonyo District, Nyanza Province, Kenya Colony
- Died: 24 November 1982 (aged 48); Nairobi, Kenya
- Education: University of Hawaii, Manoa; Harvard University
- Spouses: Kezia Aoko (m. 1954) Ann Dunham (m. 1961; div. 1964) Ruth Baker (m. 1964; div. 1973) Jael Otieno (m. 1981)
- Children: 8, including Malik, Auma, and Barack
- Parents: Hussein Onyango Obama (father); Habiba Akumu Obama (mother)
- Family: Obama

Barack Hussein Obama (/ˈbærək huːˈseɪn oʊˈbɑːmə/; born Baraka Hussein Obama, 18 June 1934 – 24 November 1982) was a Kenyan senior governmental economist and the father of Barack Obama, the 44th president of the United States. He is a central figure of his son's memoir, Dreams from My Father (1995). Obama married in 1954 and had two children with his first wife, Kezia. He was selected for a special program to attend college in the United States and studied at the University of Hawaii where he met Ann Dunham, whom he married in 1961 following the conception of his son, Barack. Obama and Dunham divorced three years later. Obama then went to Harvard University for graduate school, where he earned an MA in economics, and returned to Kenya in 1964. He saw his son Barack once more, when his son was about 10.

In late 1964, Obama married Ruth Beatrice Baker, an American woman he had met in Massachusetts. They had two sons together before separating in 1971 and divorcing in 1973. Obama first worked for an oil company, before beginning work as an economist with the Kenyan Ministry of Transport. He was promoted to senior economic analyst in the Ministry of Finance. He was among a cadre of young Kenyan men who had been educated in the West in a program supported by Tom Mboya. Obama had conflicts with Kenyan president Jomo Kenyatta, which adversely affected his career. He was fired and blacklisted in Kenya, finding it nearly impossible to get a job. Obama was involved in three serious car accidents during his final years; he died as a result of the last one in 1982.

== Early life ==
Baraka Hussein Obama was born in 1934 in Rachuonyo District on the shores of Lake Victoria just outside Kendu Bay, Kenya, at the time a colony and protectorate of the British Empire. He was raised in the village of Nyang'oma Kogelo, Siaya District, Nyanza Province. His family were members of the Luo people. His father was Onyango Obama (c. 1895–1979), and his mother was Habiba Akumu Nyanjango (c. 1918–2006) of Karabondi, Kenya, Onyango's second wife, with whom, in addition to Baraka, they had two daughters. After his mother left the family in 1945, the three children were raised by Onyango's third wife, Sarah Ogwel of Kogelo.

=== Religion and education ===
When Obama was about six years old and attending a Christian missionary school, he converted from Islam to Anglicanism when strongly encouraged by the staff, and changed his name from "Baraka" to "Barack". He later became an atheist, contending that religion was mere superstition. While still living near Kendu Bay, Obama attended Gendia Primary School. After his family moved to Siaya District, he transferred to Ng'iya Intermediate School. From 1950 to 1953, he studied at Maseno National School, an exclusive Anglican boarding school in Maseno. The head teacher, B.L. Bowers, described Obama in his records as "very keen, steady, trustworthy and friendly. Concentrates, reliable, and out-going." In 1954 at age 20, Obama married Kezia Aoko in a tribal ceremony in Kenya. They had two children, Malik (a.k.a. Roy) and Auma.

== College and graduate school ==
In 1959, the Kenyan Department of Education published Obama's monograph, entitled Otieno jarieko. Kitabu mar ariyo. 2: Yore mabeyo mag puro puothe. (English: Otieno, the wise man. Book 2: Wise ways of farming.)

Due to his accomplishments, in 1959 Obama received a scholarship in economics through a program organized by the nationalist leader Tom Mboya. The program offered education in the West to outstanding Kenyan students. Initial financial supporters of the program included Harry Belafonte, Sidney Poitier, Jackie Robinson, and Elizabeth Mooney Kirk, a literacy advocate who provided most of the financial support for Obama's early years in the United States. Kirk and her literacy associate Helen M. Roberts of Palo Alto raised the money necessary for Obama to travel to the US.

When Obama left for the United States, he left behind his young wife, Kezia, and their baby son Malik. Kezia was pregnant, and their daughter Auma was born while her father was in Hawaii. At Obama's request, Helen M. Roberts committed to watching over and financially supporting the family that he had left behind, for as long as she remained in Nairobi.

=== University of Hawaii ===
In 1959, Obama enrolled at the University of Hawaii at Manoa in Honolulu as the university's first African foreign student. He initially lived across the street from the university at the Charles H. Atherton branch of the YMCA at 1810 University Avenue; public records from 1961 indicate he later had a residence two miles southeast of the university at 625 11th Avenue in the Kaimuki neighborhood.

In 1960, Obama met Stanley Ann Dunham in a basic Russian language course at the University of Hawaii and they started dating. After becoming pregnant, Dunham dropped out of the University of Hawaii after the fall 1960 semester, while Obama continued his education. Obama married Dunham in Wailuku on the Hawaiian island of Maui on 2 February 1961, despite parental opposition from both families. He eventually told Dunham about his previous marriage in Kenya, but said he was divorced—which she found out years later was not true.

Their son, future US president Barack Hussein Obama II, was born in Honolulu on 4 August 1961 at the former Kapiolani Maternity and Gynecological Hospital (succeeded by the Kapi'olani Medical Center for Women and Children). His birth was announced in The Honolulu Advertiser and the Honolulu Star-Bulletin, with his parents' address listed as 6085 Kalanianaole Highway in the Kuliouou neighborhood of Honolulu, seven miles east of the university—the rented home of Dunham's parents, Stanley and Madelyn Dunham. Soon after her son's birth, Dunham took the infant with her to Seattle, Washington, where she took classes at the University of Washington from September 1961 to June 1962.

Obama continued his education at the University of Hawaii and in 1961–1962 lived one mile east of the university in the St. Louis Heights neighborhood. He graduated from the University of Hawaii after three years with a B.A. in economics and was elected to Phi Beta Kappa. He left Hawaii in June 1962.

=== Harvard University ===
Obama was offered a scholarship to study in New York City, but declined it. In September 1962, after a tour of mainland U.S. universities, Obama traveled to Cambridge, Massachusetts, where he began a graduate fellowship in economics at Harvard University. He rented an apartment in a rooming house near Central Square in Cambridge. Meanwhile, Dunham and their son returned to Honolulu in the latter half of 1962. In January 1964, Dunham filed for divorce in Honolulu which was not contested by Obama; they were divorced on 20 March 1964, whereupon Ann Dunham was granted sole custody of their son.

Obama was forced to leave his PhD program at Harvard University in May 1964 because of administrators' concerns over his finances and personal life, including uncertainty over the number of wives he had, but he received an M.A. in economics from Harvard in 1965. In June 1964, Obama met and began dating a 27-year-old Jewish-American elementary school teacher named Ruth Beatrice Baker, the daughter of prosperous Lithuanian immigrants to the United States.

== Return to Kenya ==
=== Third marriage ===
After graduating from Harvard, Obama returned back to Kenya in 1964. Baker followed him, and they married 24 December 1964. They had two sons together, Mark Okoth Obama in 1965 and David Opiyo Obama in 1968. Baker and Obama separated in 1971, and divorced in 1973. Baker subsequently married a Tanzanian man named Ndesandjo and took his surname, as did her sons Mark and David. Mark said in 2009 that Obama had been abusive to him, his late brother David, and their mother.

In Kenya, Obama reconnected with his first wife Kezia. She had two sons after his return: Abo (b. 1968) and Bernard (b. 1970), believed to be his children. Barack Obama, in his memoir Dreams from My Father (1995), said that his father's family had questioned whether Abo and Bernard are Barack Sr.'s biological sons.

=== Economics career ===
Obama first worked as a government economist for an oil company in Kenya. In 1965, Obama published a paper entitled "Problems Facing Our Socialism" in the East Africa Journal, harshly criticizing the blueprint for national planning, "African Socialism and Its Applicability to Planning in Kenya", developed by Tom Mboya's Ministry of Economic Planning and Development. Obama considered the document to be not adequately socialist and African. Obama served as an economist in the Kenyan Ministry of Transport. Later he was promoted to senior economist in the Kenyan Ministry of Finance.

In 1970, Obama was in a serious automobile accident, and was hospitalized for nearly a year. In December 1971, he traveled to Hawaii for a month. There he visited with his ex-wife Ann Dunham and American son Barack II, who was 10. The visit was the last time the boy saw his father. During his trip, Obama took his son to his first jazz concert, a performance by the pianist Dave Brubeck.

His son recalled Obama giving him his first basketball:

I only remember my father for one month my whole life, when I was 10. And it wasn't until much later in life that I realized, like, he gave me my first basketball and it was shortly thereafter that I became this basketball fanatic. And he took me to my first jazz concert and it was sort of shortly thereafter that I became really interested in jazz and music. So what it makes you realize how much of an impact [even if it's only a month] that they have on you. But I think probably the most important thing was his absence I think contributed to me really wanting to be a good dad, you know? Because I think not having him there made me say to myself, "You know what? I want to make sure my girls feel like they've got somebody they can rely on."

=== Final years and death ===
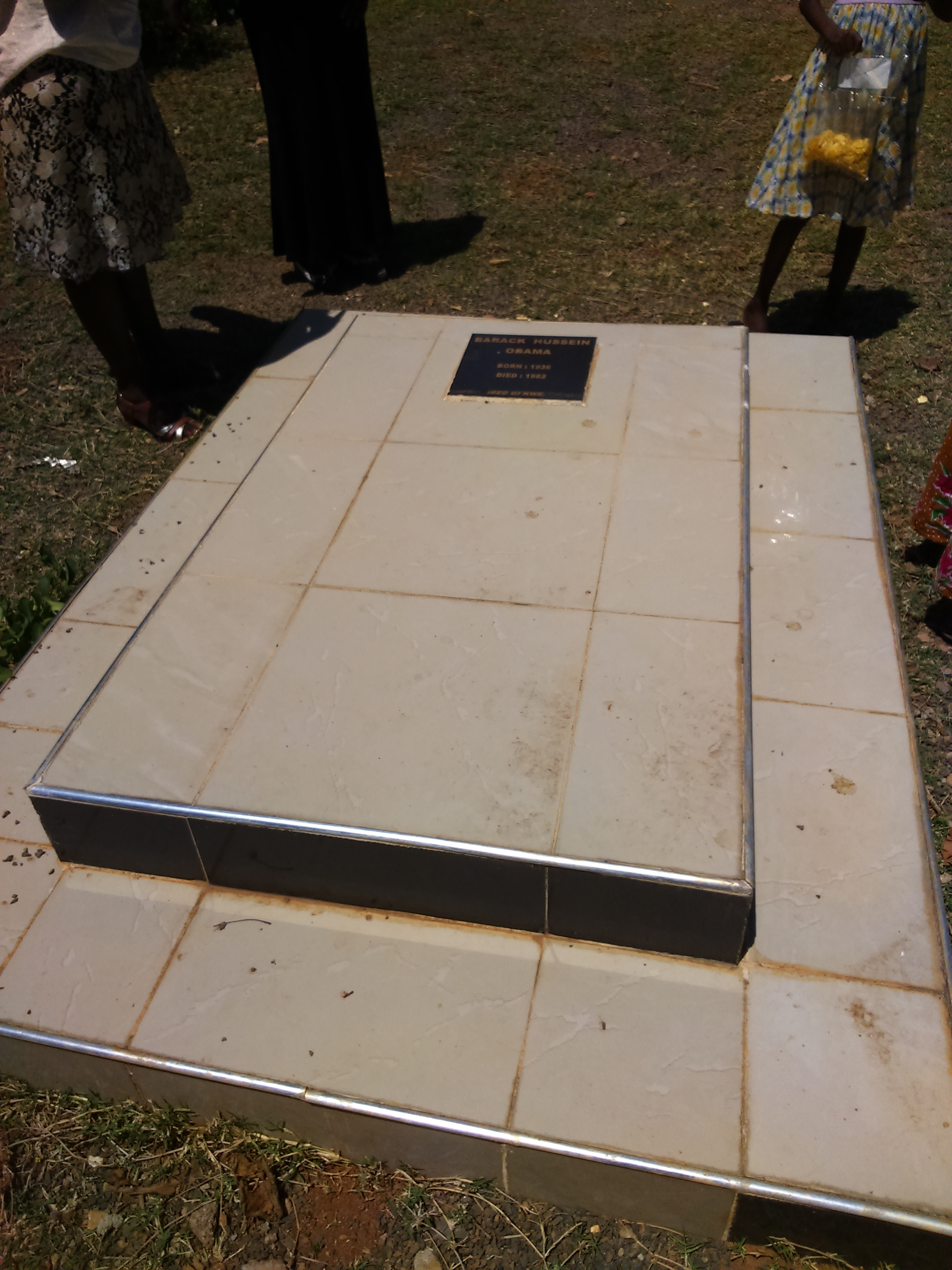
Grave of Barack Obama Sr. in home of Sarah Onyango Obama in village Nyang'oma Kogelo in Siaya County, Kenya, 19 August 2016

According to Barack II's memoir, Obama's continuing conflict with Kenyan president Jomo Kenyatta destroyed his career. He came under suspicion after Tom Mboya was assassinated in 1969, as he had been a protege of the ruler. Kenyatta fired Obama, who was blacklisted in Kenya and found it impossible to get work. By the time Obama visited his son in Hawaii in 1971, he had a bad leg from the 1970 accident.

Obama later broke both legs and shattered his knee cap in a second serious automobile accident, and subsequently lost his job. His life deteriorated as he struggled with poverty and drinking. During his final decade, he never recovered his former social or economic standing. His friend Philip Ochieng, a journalist of the Kenya newspaper Daily Nation, has described Obama's difficult personality and drinking problems. In 1982, Obama had a relationship with Jael Otinyo and with her fathered his last son, named George Obama. George was raised by his mother, who later remarried; his stepfather cared for him as well. Six months after George's birth, Obama died in a car crash in Nairobi. He was interred in his native village of Nyang'oma Kogelo, Siaya District. His funeral was attended by ministers Robert Ouko, Peter Oloo-Aringo, and other prominent political figures.

== Publications ==
- Otieno jarieko (Otieno, the Wise Man: A Series of Readers to Follow the Luo Adult Literacy Primer) (in Luo). Nairobi: East African Literature Bureau, Eagle Press. 1959. OCLC 694566336.
- "Problems facing our socialism: another critique of Sessional Paper No. 10" (PDF). East Africa Journal. 2 (4). Nairobi: 26–33. July 1965. ISSN 0012-8309.

== See also ==
- Family of Barack Obama

== Sources ==
- Obama, Barack (2004) [1995]. Dreams from My Father: A Story of Race and Inheritance. New York: Three Rivers Press. ISBN 1-4000-8277-3.
- Jacobs, Sally H. (2011). The other Barack: the bold and reckless life of President Obama's father. New York: PublicAffairs. ISBN 978-1-58648-793-5.
