= Sarah Onyango Obama =

Kenyan educator and philanthropist (1922–2021)

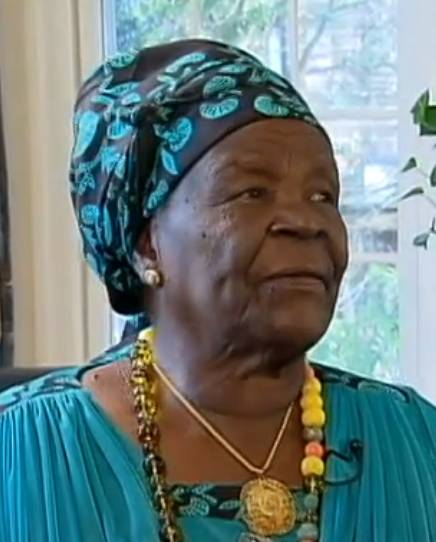
- Obama in 2014
- Born: Sarah Okech; 1921 or 1922; Kenya Colony
- Died: March 29, 2021 (aged 98–99); Kisumu, Kenya
- Known for: Mama Sarah Obama Foundation; U.S. President Barack Obama's step-grandmother
- Spouse: Hussein Onyango Obama (m. 1941; died 1979)
- Children: 4; including Zeituni Onyango

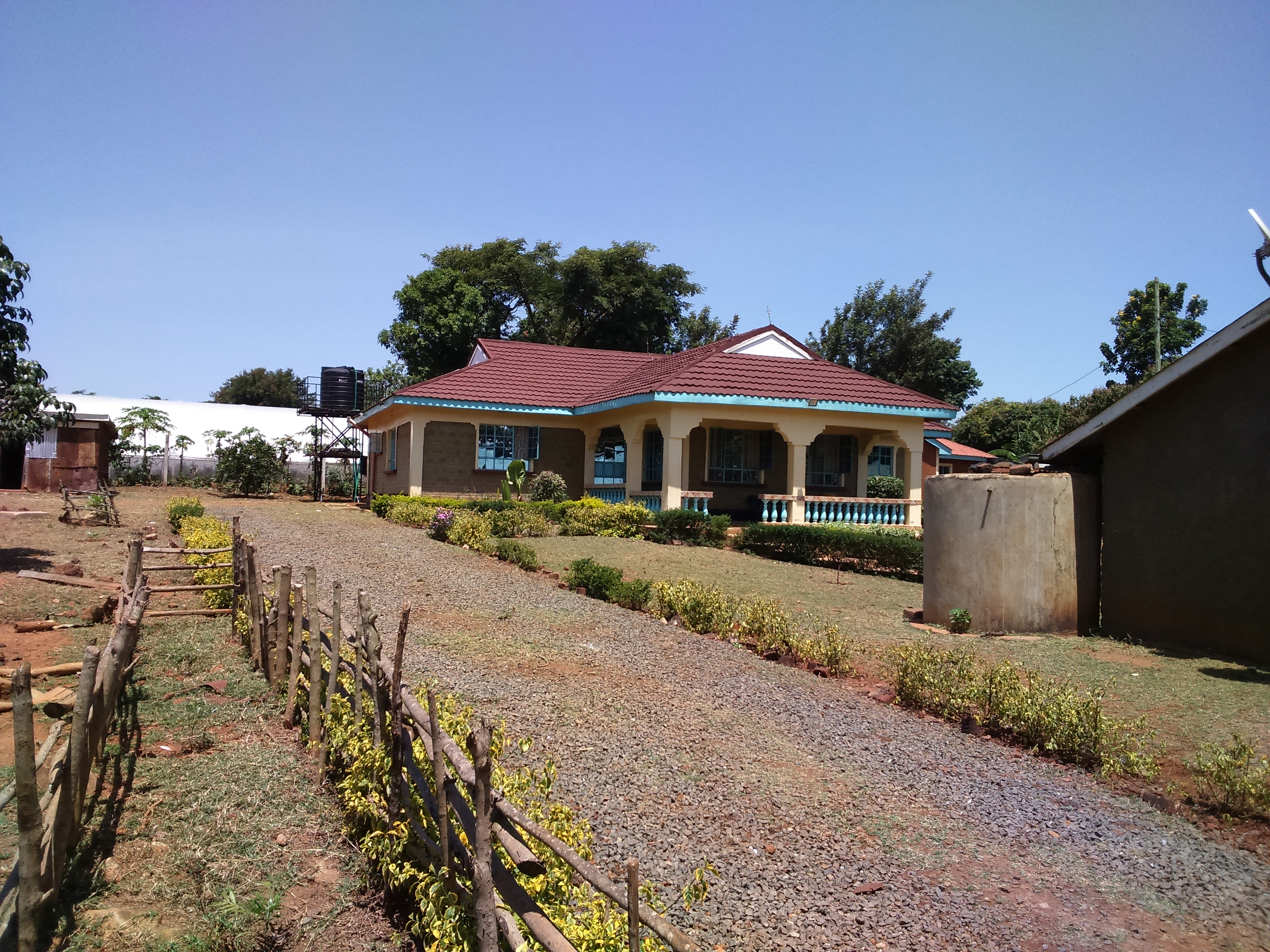
Home of Sarah Onyango Obama in village Nyang'oma Kogelo in Siaya County, Kenya, August 19, 2016

Sarah Onyango Obama (1922 – March 29, 2021) was a Kenyan educator and philanthropist. She was the third wife of Hussein Onyango Obama, the paternal grandfather of U.S. president Barack Obama and helped raise his father, Barack Obama Sr. She was known by her short name as Sarah Obama and was sometimes referred to as Sarah Ogwel, Sarah Hussein Obama, or Sarah Anyango Obama. She lived in Nyang'oma Kogelo village, 48 km (30 miles) west of western Kenya's main city, Kisumu, on the edge of Lake Victoria.

== Biography ==
As a young woman, Sarah Obama helped raise her stepson Barack Obama Sr. She was a firm believer in quality early education and regularly took him on her bicycle to primary school so that he could get the education she had been denied.

She first met her step grandson, Barack Obama II, the future President of the United States, during his visit to Kenya in 1988. Although she was not a blood relation, Barack Obama called her "Granny Sarah". In addition to mentioning her in his memoir Dreams from My Father, he spoke about her in his 2014 speech to the United Nations General Assembly. Sarah, who spoke Luo and only a few words of English, communicated with President Obama through an interpreter.

During the U.S. presidential campaign of 2008, she protested attempts to portray Obama as a foreigner to the United States or as a Muslim, saying that while Obama's grandfather had been a Muslim, "In the world of today, children have different religions from their parents." At one point in her life, she worked as a cook for Christian missionaries, but Sarah Obama was "a strong believer of the Islamic faith", in her words. On July 4, 2008, she attended the United States Independence Day celebrations in Nairobi, hosted by Michael Ranneberger, the U.S. ambassador in Kenya. The following year, she attended Barack Obama's first presidential inauguration.

In 2010, she created the Mama Sarah Obama Foundation to provide food and education to orphans, even sheltering some of them in her home.

On March 29, 2021 it was announced that Mama Sarah had died at the age of 99, in a hospital in Kisumu, Western Kenya, having suffered with an undisclosed illness a few days earlier. Following her death, Kenyan President Uhuru Kenyatta issued a statement praising her as strong, virtuous, and "an icon of family values".
