= Hannes Helmke =

German sculptor

Hannes Helmke (born 10 May 1967 in Heidelberg) is a German sculptor creating bronze sculptures.

== Life ==
After an education in wood sculpture, Helmke attended postgraduate studies in free art at the Alanus University of Arts and Social Sciences in Alfter which he completed in the summer of 1998. Since then Helmke has lived and worked as a freelance sculptor in Cologne. He spends the summer months on the North Sea island of Spiekeroog. All designs are created on Spiekeroog and implemented in bronze in Cologne.

== Work ==
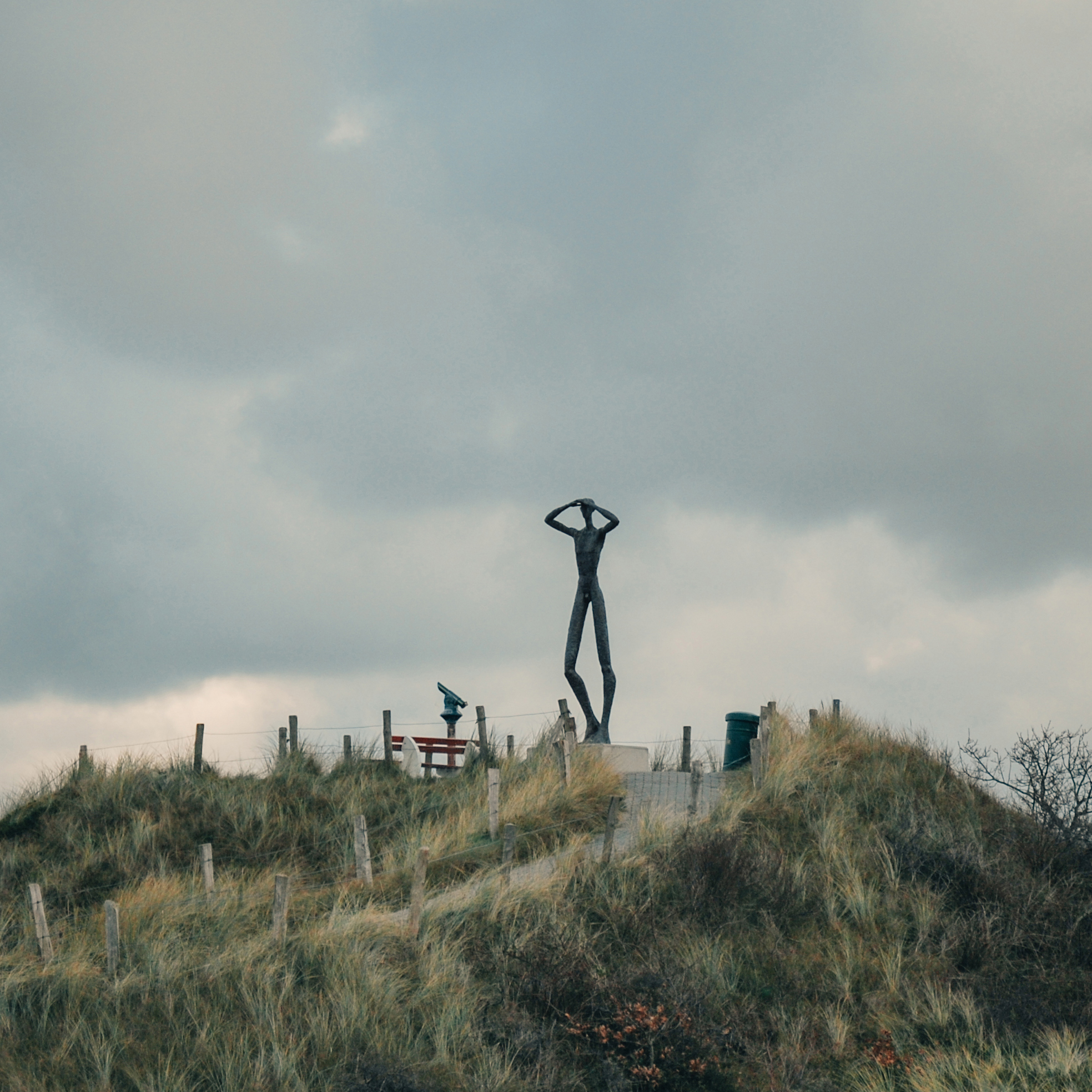
"De Utkieker" auf der Insel Spiekeroog

Helmke's artistic theme is the individual and his position in the world. Helmke's original inspiration was the long-drawn evening shadows of the human form. In recent years, Helmke's figures have changed. At first the feet were very big and the limbs were extremely long. Later the bodies became more realistic. For Helmke feet and legs represent the physical human being, whilst the upper body parts stand for the intellectual part. The vivid ears symbolize a connection with the world, the perceiving, as well as the physical big hands. With the absence of faces Helmke's desire for the greatest possible association of the viewer becomes clear.

Helmke's "De Utkieker" (height 3.50 m) has stood on a dune on the island of Spiekeroog since 2007, looking over the sea. It is a symbol for presenting the island as a natural jewel.

Since 2013 visitors of the Maison des Arts in Lingolsheim in Alsace, France have been welcomed by the huge bronze sculpture "Le rêveur sur une grande chaise."

== Works in public space ==
- "De Utkieker" Spiekeroog, Germany, 2007
- "Figur die auf Eimern balanciert" Wipperfürth, Germany, 2009
- "Le rêveur sur une grande chaise" Maison des Arts in Lingolsheim, France, 2013
- "Ein Dalbensitzer" Bingen am Rhein, Germany, 2015
- "Balancier und Sitzender auf großem Stuhl" Spiekeroog, Germany, 2020
- "Der Griff nach den Sternen" Birkenau, Germany, 2020
- "Freunde / Artisten" Fürth, Germany, 2021

== Exhibitions (selection) ==
- Art Karlsruhe, Germany · annually since 2005
- Positions Berlin, Germany · annually since 2016
- Art Fair Cologne, Germany · 2011 – 2016
- Art Bodensee, Austria · 2003, 2006 and 2008
- Sculpture Triennial Bingen · 2017
- "Black & White" Galeria K, Spain · 2017
- "Silhouette" Galleria H. 恆畫廊, Taiwan · 2015
- "Sculptour 2011" Gallery Beukenhof, Belgium · 2011
- Art Fair Tokyo, Japan · 2010
- "Helmke" Gallery Jones, Canada · 2009
- Fine Art Köln, Germany · 2007
- "Skulpturen" Max Planck Society, Germany · 2005
- "Menschenbilder" Forum Paul-Gerhardt-Church Cologne · 2002
- "Neue Skulpturen" Galerie ON · 2000
- "Kunstflut" Diploma Exhibition, Germany · 1998

== Literature ==
- Hannes Helmke, Bronzen 2005 bis 2008 · Cologne 2009 (online: Hannes Helmke | Publications)
- Hannes Helmke, Bronzeplastiken · Cologne 2011 (online: Hannes Helmke | Publications)
- Hannes Helmke, Bronzeplastiken · Cologne 2012 (online: Hannes Helmke | Publications)
- Hannes Helmke, Bronzeplastiken · Cologne 2015 (online: Hannes Helmke | Publications)
