= List of minor planets: 771001–772000 =

The following is a partial list of minor planets, running from minor-planet number 771001 through 772000, inclusive. The primary data for this and other partial lists is based on JPL's "Small-Body Orbital Elements" and data available from the Minor Planet Center. Critical list information is also provided by the MPC, unless otherwise specified from Lowell Observatory. A detailed description of the table's columns and additional sources are given on the main page including a complete list of every page in this series, and a statistical break-up on the dynamical classification of minor planets.

Also see the summary list of all named bodies in numerical and alphabetical order, and the corresponding naming citations for the number range of this particular list. New namings may only be added to this list after official publication, as the preannouncement of names is condemned by the Working Group for Small Bodies Nomenclature of the International Astronomical Union.

Near-Earth obj.	MBA (inner)	MBA (outer)	Centaur
Mars-crosser	MBA (middle)	Jupiter trojan	Trans-Neptunian obj.
Unclassified

== 771001–771100 ==
Designation			Discovery			Properties		Ref
Permanent	Provisional	Named after	Date	Site	Discoverer(s)	Category	Diam.	Ref
771001	2016 CB_{359}	—	February 11, 2016	Haleakala	Pan-STARRS 1	EOS	1.4 km	MPC · JPL
771002	2016 CW_{366}	—	February 11, 2016	Haleakala	Pan-STARRS 1	·	2.4 km	MPC · JPL
771003	2016 CE_{371}	—	February 10, 2016	Mount Lemmon	Mount Lemmon Survey	·	2.5 km	MPC · JPL
771004	2016 CL_{371}	—	January 22, 2015	Haleakala	Pan-STARRS 1	·	1.4 km	MPC · JPL
771005	2016 CM_{371}	—	February 2, 2016	Haleakala	Pan-STARRS 1	·	1.4 km	MPC · JPL
771006	2016 CB_{372}	—	February 5, 2016	Haleakala	Pan-STARRS 1	·	1.5 km	MPC · JPL
771007	2016 CN_{372}	—	February 5, 2016	Haleakala	Pan-STARRS 1	(31811)	2.3 km	MPC · JPL
771008	2016 CW_{374}	—	January 20, 2015	Mount Lemmon	Mount Lemmon Survey	·	2.0 km	MPC · JPL
771009	2016 CJ_{376}	—	February 5, 2016	Haleakala	Pan-STARRS 1	·	2.0 km	MPC · JPL
771010	2016 CM_{378}	—	August 15, 2013	Haleakala	Pan-STARRS 1	·	1.3 km	MPC · JPL
771011	2016 CW_{378}	—	August 9, 2013	Haleakala	Pan-STARRS 1	KOR	1.1 km	MPC · JPL
771012	2016 CZ_{378}	—	February 10, 2016	Haleakala	Pan-STARRS 1	·	2.3 km	MPC · JPL
771013	2016 CF_{381}	—	February 10, 2016	Haleakala	Pan-STARRS 1	V	440 m	MPC · JPL
771014	2016 CR_{383}	—	February 3, 2016	Haleakala	Pan-STARRS 1	·	2.2 km	MPC · JPL
771015	2016 CL_{386}	—	February 4, 2016	Haleakala	Pan-STARRS 1	·	1.5 km	MPC · JPL
771016	2016 CX_{387}	—	February 1, 2016	Haleakala	Pan-STARRS 1	·	1.4 km	MPC · JPL
771017	2016 CN_{388}	—	February 10, 2016	Haleakala	Pan-STARRS 1	·	2.1 km	MPC · JPL
771018	2016 CQ_{396}	—	October 28, 2014	Mount Lemmon	Mount Lemmon Survey	·	1.5 km	MPC · JPL
771019	2016 CY_{398}	—	February 5, 2016	Haleakala	Pan-STARRS 1	·	2.6 km	MPC · JPL
771020	2016 CE_{400}	—	February 5, 2016	Haleakala	Pan-STARRS 1	·	2.0 km	MPC · JPL
771021	2016 CF_{400}	—	February 11, 2016	Haleakala	Pan-STARRS 1	·	2.3 km	MPC · JPL
771022	2016 CR_{407}	—	February 3, 2016	Haleakala	Pan-STARRS 1	·	1.9 km	MPC · JPL
771023	2016 CC_{408}	—	November 17, 2014	Haleakala	Pan-STARRS 1	·	560 m	MPC · JPL
771024	2016 CF_{408}	—	February 10, 2016	Haleakala	Pan-STARRS 1	EOS	1.3 km	MPC · JPL
771025	2016 CJ_{408}	—	January 17, 2016	Haleakala	Pan-STARRS 1	·	1.8 km	MPC · JPL
771026	2016 CQ_{408}	—	April 17, 2013	Haleakala	Pan-STARRS 1	·	590 m	MPC · JPL
771027	2016 CV_{411}	—	February 6, 2016	Haleakala	Pan-STARRS 1	·	1.4 km	MPC · JPL
771028	2016 CA_{412}	—	February 11, 2016	Haleakala	Pan-STARRS 1	EOS	1.3 km	MPC · JPL
771029	2016 CG_{412}	—	February 5, 2016	Haleakala	Pan-STARRS 1	·	1.3 km	MPC · JPL
771030	2016 CA_{430}	—	February 11, 2016	Haleakala	Pan-STARRS 1	·	1.5 km	MPC · JPL
771031	2016 DZ_{2}	—	February 5, 2011	Mount Lemmon	Mount Lemmon Survey	TRE	1.7 km	MPC · JPL
771032	2016 DO_{12}	—	March 10, 2011	Kitt Peak	Spacewatch	EOS	1.3 km	MPC · JPL
771033	2016 DU_{29}	—	February 29, 2016	Haleakala	Pan-STARRS 1	·	1.5 km	MPC · JPL
771034	2016 DR_{30}	—	April 4, 2011	Kitt Peak	Spacewatch	·	2.0 km	MPC · JPL
771035	2016 DH_{33}	—	February 10, 2011	Mount Lemmon	Mount Lemmon Survey	AST	1.4 km	MPC · JPL
771036	2016 DT_{33}	—	April 3, 2011	Haleakala	Pan-STARRS 1	·	2.0 km	MPC · JPL
771037	2016 DF_{34}	—	November 26, 2014	Haleakala	Pan-STARRS 1	·	1.9 km	MPC · JPL
771038	2016 DJ_{34}	—	October 28, 2014	Haleakala	Pan-STARRS 1	·	1.6 km	MPC · JPL
771039	2016 DN_{34}	—	February 28, 2016	Mount Lemmon	Mount Lemmon Survey	·	1 km	MPC · JPL
771040	2016 DB_{40}	—	February 28, 2016	Mount Lemmon	Mount Lemmon Survey	EOS	1.5 km	MPC · JPL
771041	2016 DL_{43}	—	February 29, 2016	Haleakala	Pan-STARRS 1	·	1.4 km	MPC · JPL
771042	2016 DX_{43}	—	February 29, 2016	Haleakala	Pan-STARRS 1	·	1.6 km	MPC · JPL
771043	2016 ER_{6}	—	April 13, 2013	Haleakala	Pan-STARRS 1	·	440 m	MPC · JPL
771044	2016 EB_{9}	—	August 25, 2014	Haleakala	Pan-STARRS 1	·	1.4 km	MPC · JPL
771045	2016 EM_{10}	—	February 11, 2016	Haleakala	Pan-STARRS 1	EOS	1.4 km	MPC · JPL
771046	2016 EY_{10}	—	February 3, 2016	Haleakala	Pan-STARRS 1	·	1.5 km	MPC · JPL
771047	2016 EV_{15}	—	April 22, 2011	Kitt Peak	Spacewatch	·	2.9 km	MPC · JPL
771048	2016 EP_{16}	—	March 3, 2016	Haleakala	Pan-STARRS 1	·	2.6 km	MPC · JPL
771049	2016 ET_{16}	—	February 11, 2016	Haleakala	Pan-STARRS 1	·	1.7 km	MPC · JPL
771050	2016 EZ_{18}	—	March 3, 2016	Haleakala	Pan-STARRS 1	·	1.6 km	MPC · JPL
771051	2016 EN_{23}	—	November 26, 2014	Haleakala	Pan-STARRS 1	BRA	1.2 km	MPC · JPL
771052	2016 ER_{23}	—	May 9, 2011	Mount Lemmon	Mount Lemmon Survey	·	2.4 km	MPC · JPL
771053	2016 EE_{30}	—	November 28, 2014	Kitt Peak	Spacewatch	·	2.0 km	MPC · JPL
771054	2016 EN_{31}	—	October 9, 2007	Mount Lemmon	Mount Lemmon Survey	TIR	2.1 km	MPC · JPL
771055	2016 EO_{31}	—	January 8, 2016	Haleakala	Pan-STARRS 1	·	2.2 km	MPC · JPL
771056	2016 EQ_{31}	—	April 30, 2012	Kitt Peak	Spacewatch	·	1.4 km	MPC · JPL
771057	2016 ES_{31}	—	May 2, 2006	Mount Lemmon	Mount Lemmon Survey	EOS	1.4 km	MPC · JPL
771058	2016 EY_{33}	—	March 3, 2016	Haleakala	Pan-STARRS 1	·	1.4 km	MPC · JPL
771059	2016 EH_{37}	—	August 24, 2012	Kitt Peak	Spacewatch	·	2.7 km	MPC · JPL
771060	2016 EL_{38}	—	October 29, 2014	Haleakala	Pan-STARRS 1	·	2.1 km	MPC · JPL
771061	2016 ET_{40}	—	January 4, 2016	Haleakala	Pan-STARRS 1	·	1.6 km	MPC · JPL
771062	2016 ES_{41}	—	January 7, 2016	Haleakala	Pan-STARRS 1	·	1.8 km	MPC · JPL
771063	2016 EX_{43}	—	March 4, 2016	Haleakala	Pan-STARRS 1	·	2.2 km	MPC · JPL
771064	2016 EU_{46}	—	March 4, 2016	Haleakala	Pan-STARRS 1	·	2.0 km	MPC · JPL
771065	2016 ED_{47}	—	May 1, 2011	Haleakala	Pan-STARRS 1	URS	2.5 km	MPC · JPL
771066	2016 ER_{47}	—	April 28, 2011	Kitt Peak	Spacewatch	·	2.5 km	MPC · JPL
771067	2016 EB_{49}	—	January 2, 2009	Kitt Peak	Spacewatch	·	3.3 km	MPC · JPL
771068	2016 EG_{51}	—	March 4, 2016	Haleakala	Pan-STARRS 1	·	1.9 km	MPC · JPL
771069	2016 EA_{61}	—	September 14, 2013	Haleakala	Pan-STARRS 1	EOS	1.5 km	MPC · JPL
771070	2016 EG_{65}	—	March 4, 2016	Haleakala	Pan-STARRS 1	·	1.4 km	MPC · JPL
771071	2016 EJ_{68}	—	August 12, 2013	Haleakala	Pan-STARRS 1	·	1.8 km	MPC · JPL
771072	2016 ED_{71}	—	January 26, 2006	Mount Lemmon	Mount Lemmon Survey	·	580 m	MPC · JPL
771073	2016 ER_{71}	—	September 19, 2014	Haleakala	Pan-STARRS 1	·	570 m	MPC · JPL
771074	2016 ED_{74}	—	November 17, 2014	Mount Lemmon	Mount Lemmon Survey	·	1.4 km	MPC · JPL
771075	2016 EY_{75}	—	February 11, 2011	Mount Lemmon	Mount Lemmon Survey	·	1.6 km	MPC · JPL
771076	2016 EH_{83}	—	January 13, 2016	Haleakala	Pan-STARRS 1	·	1.4 km	MPC · JPL
771077	2016 EM_{83}	—	December 13, 2010	Mauna Kea	M. Micheli, L. Wells	·	1.5 km	MPC · JPL
771078	2016 EB_{84}	—	December 8, 2010	Mount Lemmon	Mount Lemmon Survey	·	1.6 km	MPC · JPL
771079	2016 EG_{87}	—	December 29, 2011	Kitt Peak	Spacewatch	·	1.0 km	MPC · JPL
771080	2016 EH_{91}	—	March 3, 2016	Mount Lemmon	Mount Lemmon Survey	·	2.8 km	MPC · JPL
771081	2016 EM_{91}	—	October 16, 2003	Kitt Peak	Spacewatch	·	1.2 km	MPC · JPL
771082	2016 EO_{91}	—	September 6, 2013	Mount Lemmon	Mount Lemmon Survey	·	1.8 km	MPC · JPL
771083	2016 ER_{91}	—	March 7, 2016	Haleakala	Pan-STARRS 1	EOS	1.5 km	MPC · JPL
771084	2016 EY_{92}	—	May 14, 2012	Haleakala	Pan-STARRS 1	·	1.8 km	MPC · JPL
771085	2016 EZ_{92}	—	March 7, 2016	Haleakala	Pan-STARRS 1	·	2.3 km	MPC · JPL
771086	2016 EQ_{94}	—	March 7, 2016	Haleakala	Pan-STARRS 1	·	1.9 km	MPC · JPL
771087	2016 ED_{95}	—	March 7, 2016	Haleakala	Pan-STARRS 1	·	2.0 km	MPC · JPL
771088	2016 EZ_{95}	—	February 3, 2016	Haleakala	Pan-STARRS 1	615	1.1 km	MPC · JPL
771089	2016 EG_{96}	—	November 24, 2014	Mount Lemmon	Mount Lemmon Survey	·	2.2 km	MPC · JPL
771090	2016 EL_{96}	—	March 7, 2016	Haleakala	Pan-STARRS 1	VER	1.9 km	MPC · JPL
771091	2016 EU_{96}	—	February 3, 2016	Haleakala	Pan-STARRS 1	TEL	970 m	MPC · JPL
771092	2016 EZ_{96}	—	November 17, 2014	Haleakala	Pan-STARRS 1	·	1.6 km	MPC · JPL
771093	2016 ER_{99}	—	December 21, 2008	Kitt Peak	Spacewatch	·	520 m	MPC · JPL
771094	2016 EU_{99}	—	February 4, 2016	Haleakala	Pan-STARRS 1	EOS	1.5 km	MPC · JPL
771095	2016 EJ_{100}	—	November 26, 2014	Haleakala	Pan-STARRS 1	VER	2.2 km	MPC · JPL
771096	2016 EX_{101}	—	October 31, 2008	Kitt Peak	Spacewatch	·	2.0 km	MPC · JPL
771097	2016 EC_{102}	—	March 24, 2011	Piszkés-tető	K. Sárneczky, Z. Kuli	·	1.4 km	MPC · JPL
771098	2016 ED_{102}	—	September 14, 2013	Haleakala	Pan-STARRS 1	·	2.1 km	MPC · JPL
771099	2016 EA_{103}	—	February 11, 2016	Haleakala	Pan-STARRS 1	EOS	1.4 km	MPC · JPL
771100	2016 ES_{103}	—	February 4, 2016	Haleakala	Pan-STARRS 1	·	1.7 km	MPC · JPL

== 771101–771200 ==
back to top

Designation			Discovery			Properties		Ref
Permanent	Provisional	Named after	Date	Site	Discoverer(s)	Category	Diam.	Ref
771101	2016 EX_{103}	—	August 23, 2014	Haleakala	Pan-STARRS 1	·	1.3 km	MPC · JPL
771102	2016 EQ_{104}	—	January 14, 2015	Haleakala	Pan-STARRS 1	·	2.2 km	MPC · JPL
771103	2016 EQ_{106}	—	January 13, 2011	Kitt Peak	Spacewatch	·	1.9 km	MPC · JPL
771104	2016 EH_{107}	—	March 7, 2016	Haleakala	Pan-STARRS 1	EOS	1.5 km	MPC · JPL
771105	2016 EP_{112}	—	February 25, 2006	Mount Lemmon	Mount Lemmon Survey	·	510 m	MPC · JPL
771106	2016 EV_{116}	—	May 21, 2012	Mount Lemmon	Mount Lemmon Survey	·	1.5 km	MPC · JPL
771107	2016 EO_{120}	—	February 3, 2016	Haleakala	Pan-STARRS 1	GAL	1.3 km	MPC · JPL
771108	2016 EV_{121}	—	September 25, 2013	Mount Lemmon	Mount Lemmon Survey	·	2.1 km	MPC · JPL
771109	2016 ES_{134}	—	September 18, 2014	Haleakala	Pan-STARRS 1	·	500 m	MPC · JPL
771110	2016 ED_{135}	—	October 20, 2007	Kitt Peak	Spacewatch	VER	2.1 km	MPC · JPL
771111	2016 EM_{135}	—	November 19, 2008	Kitt Peak	Spacewatch	·	1.8 km	MPC · JPL
771112	2016 ES_{135}	—	March 10, 2016	Haleakala	Pan-STARRS 1	·	1.6 km	MPC · JPL
771113	2016 EQ_{136}	—	March 1, 2016	Haleakala	Pan-STARRS 1	·	2.1 km	MPC · JPL
771114	2016 EH_{138}	—	June 12, 2011	Mount Lemmon	Mount Lemmon Survey	TIR	2.1 km	MPC · JPL
771115	2016 ES_{141}	—	January 7, 2006	Kitt Peak	Spacewatch	·	1.4 km	MPC · JPL
771116	2016 EU_{148}	—	February 18, 2010	Kitt Peak	Spacewatch	·	2.0 km	MPC · JPL
771117	2016 EC_{150}	—	March 10, 2016	Haleakala	Pan-STARRS 1	MRX	840 m	MPC · JPL
771118	2016 EK_{150}	—	March 6, 2016	Haleakala	Pan-STARRS 1	·	1.6 km	MPC · JPL
771119	2016 EC_{151}	—	February 26, 2009	Kitt Peak	Spacewatch	·	510 m	MPC · JPL
771120	2016 EB_{152}	—	March 10, 2016	Haleakala	Pan-STARRS 1	·	1.4 km	MPC · JPL
771121	2016 EP_{159}	—	January 14, 2011	Mount Lemmon	Mount Lemmon Survey	·	1.1 km	MPC · JPL
771122	2016 ER_{160}	—	April 5, 2005	Mount Lemmon	Mount Lemmon Survey	·	2.3 km	MPC · JPL
771123	2016 EV_{160}	—	October 25, 2014	Mount Lemmon	Mount Lemmon Survey	V	440 m	MPC · JPL
771124	2016 EL_{168}	—	January 18, 2016	Haleakala	Pan-STARRS 1	·	1.3 km	MPC · JPL
771125	2016 EO_{171}	—	November 7, 2002	Kitt Peak	Deep Ecliptic Survey	·	2.0 km	MPC · JPL
771126	2016 EU_{179}	—	October 1, 2013	Kitt Peak	Spacewatch	EOS	1.4 km	MPC · JPL
771127	2016 EA_{180}	—	April 2, 2011	Mount Lemmon	Mount Lemmon Survey	EOS	1.4 km	MPC · JPL
771128	2016 EM_{180}	—	January 28, 2011	Kitt Peak	Spacewatch	·	1.4 km	MPC · JPL
771129	2016 ES_{185}	—	November 17, 2014	Haleakala	Pan-STARRS 1	MRX	780 m	MPC · JPL
771130	2016 ET_{186}	—	December 16, 2014	Haleakala	Pan-STARRS 1	·	2.6 km	MPC · JPL
771131	2016 EV_{188}	—	October 30, 2014	Mount Lemmon	Mount Lemmon Survey	·	870 m	MPC · JPL
771132	2016 EQ_{189}	—	March 13, 2016	Haleakala	Pan-STARRS 1	·	1.3 km	MPC · JPL
771133	2016 ET_{193}	—	April 21, 2012	Kitt Peak	Spacewatch	·	1.4 km	MPC · JPL
771134	2016 ER_{197}	—	August 15, 2013	Haleakala	Pan-STARRS 1	·	1.8 km	MPC · JPL
771135	2016 EJ_{207}	—	March 12, 2016	Haleakala	Pan-STARRS 1	·	2.2 km	MPC · JPL
771136	2016 EA_{208}	—	June 10, 2011	Mount Lemmon	Mount Lemmon Survey	·	2.4 km	MPC · JPL
771137	2016 EP_{208}	—	April 1, 2011	Mount Lemmon	Mount Lemmon Survey	·	1.7 km	MPC · JPL
771138	2016 EL_{210}	—	May 6, 2006	Mount Lemmon	Mount Lemmon Survey	·	2.2 km	MPC · JPL
771139	2016 EX_{210}	—	October 12, 2013	Kitt Peak	Spacewatch	EOS	1.3 km	MPC · JPL
771140	2016 EZ_{214}	—	March 15, 2016	Mount Lemmon	Mount Lemmon Survey	·	2.1 km	MPC · JPL
771141	2016 EQ_{215}	—	August 24, 2012	Kitt Peak	Spacewatch	·	2.0 km	MPC · JPL
771142	2016 EE_{216}	—	March 10, 2016	Haleakala	Pan-STARRS 1	·	1.5 km	MPC · JPL
771143	2016 EN_{216}	—	March 11, 2016	Haleakala	Pan-STARRS 1	·	1.8 km	MPC · JPL
771144	2016 EL_{218}	—	October 3, 2013	Mount Lemmon	Mount Lemmon Survey	EOS	1.3 km	MPC · JPL
771145	2016 EH_{219}	—	October 21, 2008	Kitt Peak	Spacewatch	EOS	1.2 km	MPC · JPL
771146	2016 EJ_{219}	—	March 10, 2007	Mount Lemmon	Mount Lemmon Survey	·	1.1 km	MPC · JPL
771147	2016 EA_{220}	—	September 14, 2007	Mount Lemmon	Mount Lemmon Survey	·	2.0 km	MPC · JPL
771148	2016 EL_{220}	—	March 5, 2016	Haleakala	Pan-STARRS 1	·	1.5 km	MPC · JPL
771149	2016 EP_{221}	—	September 9, 2007	Mount Lemmon	Mount Lemmon Survey	·	2.2 km	MPC · JPL
771150	2016 ET_{223}	—	October 8, 2008	Mount Lemmon	Mount Lemmon Survey	·	1.8 km	MPC · JPL
771151	2016 EB_{224}	—	April 4, 2011	Mount Lemmon	Mount Lemmon Survey	·	1.5 km	MPC · JPL
771152	2016 EA_{225}	—	March 10, 2016	Haleakala	Pan-STARRS 1	·	1.4 km	MPC · JPL
771153	2016 EX_{225}	—	March 5, 2016	Haleakala	Pan-STARRS 1	·	2.6 km	MPC · JPL
771154	2016 EF_{227}	—	March 13, 2016	Haleakala	Pan-STARRS 1	THM	1.8 km	MPC · JPL
771155	2016 EG_{227}	—	March 13, 2016	Haleakala	Pan-STARRS 1	·	1.2 km	MPC · JPL
771156	2016 EN_{229}	—	July 18, 2012	Catalina	CSS	TIR	2.5 km	MPC · JPL
771157	2016 EA_{230}	—	August 14, 2013	Haleakala	Pan-STARRS 1	·	1.5 km	MPC · JPL
771158	2016 EB_{230}	—	March 1, 2016	Haleakala	Pan-STARRS 1	·	2.3 km	MPC · JPL
771159	2016 EL_{231}	—	October 6, 2008	Mount Lemmon	Mount Lemmon Survey	EOS	1.4 km	MPC · JPL
771160	2016 EX_{231}	—	March 3, 2016	Haleakala	Pan-STARRS 1	·	1.7 km	MPC · JPL
771161	2016 EF_{232}	—	November 26, 2014	Haleakala	Pan-STARRS 1	·	1.6 km	MPC · JPL
771162	2016 EL_{232}	—	March 4, 2016	Haleakala	Pan-STARRS 1	LIX	2.3 km	MPC · JPL
771163	2016 EL_{233}	—	October 2, 2013	Mount Lemmon	Mount Lemmon Survey	ELF	2.8 km	MPC · JPL
771164	2016 EL_{234}	—	January 15, 2015	Mount Lemmon	Mount Lemmon Survey	·	1.8 km	MPC · JPL
771165	2016 EN_{234}	—	March 4, 2016	Haleakala	Pan-STARRS 1	·	2.5 km	MPC · JPL
771166	2016 EN_{235}	—	March 4, 2016	Haleakala	Pan-STARRS 1	BRA	1.0 km	MPC · JPL
771167	2016 EX_{235}	—	October 24, 2013	Mount Lemmon	Mount Lemmon Survey	·	1.2 km	MPC · JPL
771168	2016 EJ_{236}	—	December 20, 2014	Kitt Peak	Spacewatch	·	2.2 km	MPC · JPL
771169	2016 EY_{236}	—	December 21, 2014	Haleakala	Pan-STARRS 1	·	2.7 km	MPC · JPL
771170	2016 EW_{237}	—	November 9, 2013	Haleakala	Pan-STARRS 1	·	2.5 km	MPC · JPL
771171	2016 EH_{238}	—	May 9, 2011	Mount Lemmon	Mount Lemmon Survey	THM	1.9 km	MPC · JPL
771172	2016 EQ_{238}	—	March 7, 2016	Haleakala	Pan-STARRS 1	·	2.1 km	MPC · JPL
771173	2016 EE_{240}	—	November 28, 2014	Haleakala	Pan-STARRS 1	·	1.7 km	MPC · JPL
771174	2016 ER_{240}	—	August 12, 2013	Haleakala	Pan-STARRS 1	KOR	1.0 km	MPC · JPL
771175	2016 ES_{240}	—	March 10, 2016	Haleakala	Pan-STARRS 1	KOR	1.0 km	MPC · JPL
771176	2016 EY_{240}	—	May 22, 2011	Mount Lemmon	Mount Lemmon Survey	·	2.1 km	MPC · JPL
771177	2016 EB_{241}	—	March 10, 2016	Haleakala	Pan-STARRS 1	·	1.5 km	MPC · JPL
771178	2016 EC_{241}	—	December 29, 2014	Haleakala	Pan-STARRS 1	·	2.5 km	MPC · JPL
771179	2016 EP_{242}	—	March 10, 2016	Haleakala	Pan-STARRS 1	·	1.8 km	MPC · JPL
771180	2016 EB_{243}	—	September 24, 2013	Mount Lemmon	Mount Lemmon Survey	·	1.4 km	MPC · JPL
771181	2016 EO_{243}	—	March 10, 2016	Haleakala	Pan-STARRS 1	·	2.2 km	MPC · JPL
771182	2016 ES_{243}	—	December 21, 2014	Haleakala	Pan-STARRS 1	·	1.4 km	MPC · JPL
771183	2016 EW_{244}	—	May 3, 2011	Kitt Peak	Spacewatch	THM	1.9 km	MPC · JPL
771184	2016 EL_{245}	—	May 21, 2011	Mount Lemmon	Mount Lemmon Survey	·	2.4 km	MPC · JPL
771185	2016 EL_{248}	—	May 1, 2011	Haleakala	Pan-STARRS 1	·	2.1 km	MPC · JPL
771186	2016 EV_{250}	—	March 13, 2016	Haleakala	Pan-STARRS 1	·	730 m	MPC · JPL
771187	2016 EO_{251}	—	March 2, 2016	Haleakala	Pan-STARRS 1	·	620 m	MPC · JPL
771188	2016 EV_{253}	—	March 7, 2016	Haleakala	Pan-STARRS 1	·	2.1 km	MPC · JPL
771189	2016 ER_{257}	—	March 12, 2016	Mount Lemmon	Mount Lemmon Survey	·	1.9 km	MPC · JPL
771190	2016 EC_{260}	—	March 7, 2016	Haleakala	Pan-STARRS 1	·	1.7 km	MPC · JPL
771191	2016 EB_{261}	—	March 12, 2016	Haleakala	Pan-STARRS 1	·	1.8 km	MPC · JPL
771192	2016 EX_{262}	—	March 5, 2016	Haleakala	Pan-STARRS 1	·	2.7 km	MPC · JPL
771193	2016 EO_{263}	—	March 10, 2016	Haleakala	Pan-STARRS 1	·	1.1 km	MPC · JPL
771194	2016 ET_{264}	—	March 10, 2016	Mount Lemmon	Mount Lemmon Survey	·	980 m	MPC · JPL
771195	2016 EZ_{265}	—	March 4, 2016	Haleakala	Pan-STARRS 1	·	2.5 km	MPC · JPL
771196	2016 EM_{267}	—	March 6, 2016	Haleakala	Pan-STARRS 1	EOS	1.4 km	MPC · JPL
771197	2016 EQ_{267}	—	March 11, 2016	Haleakala	Pan-STARRS 1	·	1.7 km	MPC · JPL
771198	2016 EV_{268}	—	March 3, 2016	Haleakala	Pan-STARRS 1	·	1.7 km	MPC · JPL
771199	2016 EJ_{271}	—	March 10, 2016	Haleakala	Pan-STARRS 1	NEM	1.4 km	MPC · JPL
771200	2016 ED_{272}	—	March 7, 2016	Haleakala	Pan-STARRS 1	·	670 m	MPC · JPL

== 771201–771300 ==
back to top

Designation			Discovery			Properties		Ref
Permanent	Provisional	Named after	Date	Site	Discoverer(s)	Category	Diam.	Ref
771201	2016 EL_{272}	—	March 1, 2016	Haleakala	Pan-STARRS 1	V	450 m	MPC · JPL
771202	2016 EG_{274}	—	March 11, 2016	Haleakala	Pan-STARRS 1	·	500 m	MPC · JPL
771203	2016 EW_{274}	—	March 10, 2016	Mount Lemmon	Mount Lemmon Survey	KOR	1.3 km	MPC · JPL
771204	2016 EE_{275}	—	September 19, 2001	Kitt Peak	Spacewatch	·	2.5 km	MPC · JPL
771205	2016 EK_{275}	—	March 14, 2016	Mount Lemmon	Mount Lemmon Survey	·	2.5 km	MPC · JPL
771206	2016 EX_{279}	—	March 11, 2016	Mount Lemmon	Mount Lemmon Survey	EOS	1.4 km	MPC · JPL
771207	2016 EJ_{281}	—	March 4, 2016	Haleakala	Pan-STARRS 1	·	2.2 km	MPC · JPL
771208	2016 EK_{281}	—	March 1, 2016	Haleakala	Pan-STARRS 1	·	1.5 km	MPC · JPL
771209	2016 EM_{281}	—	March 12, 2016	Haleakala	Pan-STARRS 1	EOS	1.3 km	MPC · JPL
771210	2016 EN_{281}	—	March 1, 2016	Haleakala	Pan-STARRS 1	·	2.6 km	MPC · JPL
771211	2016 EC_{285}	—	March 6, 2016	Haleakala	Pan-STARRS 1	EOS	1.3 km	MPC · JPL
771212	2016 ER_{288}	—	March 4, 2016	Haleakala	Pan-STARRS 1	·	2.8 km	MPC · JPL
771213	2016 EU_{289}	—	March 12, 2016	Haleakala	Pan-STARRS 1	·	1.9 km	MPC · JPL
771214	2016 ET_{290}	—	March 5, 2016	Haleakala	Pan-STARRS 1	·	2.4 km	MPC · JPL
771215	2016 EV_{291}	—	March 4, 2016	Haleakala	Pan-STARRS 1	·	2.2 km	MPC · JPL
771216	2016 EW_{291}	—	March 10, 2016	Haleakala	Pan-STARRS 1	EOS	1.2 km	MPC · JPL
771217	2016 EF_{292}	—	March 7, 2016	Haleakala	Pan-STARRS 1	EOS	1.4 km	MPC · JPL
771218	2016 EQ_{292}	—	December 11, 2014	Mount Lemmon	Mount Lemmon Survey	·	1.3 km	MPC · JPL
771219	2016 EJ_{293}	—	March 3, 2016	Haleakala	Pan-STARRS 1	·	1.5 km	MPC · JPL
771220	2016 EO_{293}	—	March 10, 2016	Haleakala	Pan-STARRS 1	·	1.4 km	MPC · JPL
771221	2016 EQ_{293}	—	March 10, 2016	Haleakala	Pan-STARRS 1	EOS	1.4 km	MPC · JPL
771222	2016 EY_{294}	—	March 10, 2016	Haleakala	Pan-STARRS 1	·	1.6 km	MPC · JPL
771223	2016 EH_{296}	—	March 6, 2016	Haleakala	Pan-STARRS 1	AGN	930 m	MPC · JPL
771224	2016 EO_{297}	—	March 7, 2016	Haleakala	Pan-STARRS 1	V	450 m	MPC · JPL
771225	2016 EZ_{299}	—	March 1, 2016	Haleakala	Pan-STARRS 1	·	1.4 km	MPC · JPL
771226	2016 ED_{300}	—	March 12, 2016	Haleakala	Pan-STARRS 1	NAE	1.7 km	MPC · JPL
771227	2016 EU_{300}	—	March 4, 2016	Haleakala	Pan-STARRS 1	·	1.6 km	MPC · JPL
771228	2016 ED_{301}	—	January 17, 2015	Haleakala	Pan-STARRS 1	·	2.4 km	MPC · JPL
771229	2016 EU_{301}	—	March 13, 2016	Haleakala	Pan-STARRS 1	·	1.8 km	MPC · JPL
771230	2016 EN_{302}	—	March 13, 2016	Haleakala	Pan-STARRS 1	EOS	1.4 km	MPC · JPL
771231	2016 EB_{303}	—	March 4, 2016	Haleakala	Pan-STARRS 1	·	1.9 km	MPC · JPL
771232	2016 EF_{303}	—	January 22, 2015	Haleakala	Pan-STARRS 1	·	2.3 km	MPC · JPL
771233	2016 EY_{305}	—	March 15, 2016	Mount Lemmon	Mount Lemmon Survey	·	1.4 km	MPC · JPL
771234	2016 EA_{306}	—	March 7, 2016	Haleakala	Pan-STARRS 1	·	1.9 km	MPC · JPL
771235	2016 ER_{309}	—	March 11, 2016	Mount Lemmon	Mount Lemmon Survey	EOS	1.2 km	MPC · JPL
771236	2016 EP_{311}	—	March 14, 2016	Mount Lemmon	Mount Lemmon Survey	·	640 m	MPC · JPL
771237	2016 EZ_{311}	—	March 1, 2016	Haleakala	Pan-STARRS 1	·	2.2 km	MPC · JPL
771238	2016 EH_{312}	—	January 17, 2015	Mount Lemmon	Mount Lemmon Survey	·	2.5 km	MPC · JPL
771239	2016 EW_{312}	—	September 14, 2013	Haleakala	Pan-STARRS 1	·	1.7 km	MPC · JPL
771240	2016 EM_{314}	—	October 26, 2013	Kitt Peak	Spacewatch	·	2.4 km	MPC · JPL
771241	2016 EB_{316}	—	October 24, 2013	Mount Lemmon	Mount Lemmon Survey	EOS	1.3 km	MPC · JPL
771242	2016 ET_{319}	—	March 12, 2016	Haleakala	Pan-STARRS 1	·	1.6 km	MPC · JPL
771243	2016 EB_{335}	—	March 13, 2016	Haleakala	Pan-STARRS 1	·	2.5 km	MPC · JPL
771244	2016 EM_{335}	—	October 13, 2013	Mount Lemmon	Mount Lemmon Survey	·	2.1 km	MPC · JPL
771245	2016 EJ_{336}	—	March 1, 2016	Haleakala	Pan-STARRS 1	EOS	1.6 km	MPC · JPL
771246	2016 ES_{336}	—	April 7, 2011	Kitt Peak	Spacewatch	THM	1.9 km	MPC · JPL
771247	2016 EV_{336}	—	November 18, 2008	Kitt Peak	Spacewatch	·	2.3 km	MPC · JPL
771248	2016 EP_{339}	—	March 12, 2016	Haleakala	Pan-STARRS 1	·	2.4 km	MPC · JPL
771249	2016 EL_{348}	—	March 15, 2016	Haleakala	Pan-STARRS 1	·	510 m	MPC · JPL
771250	2016 EX_{351}	—	April 27, 2011	Kitt Peak	Spacewatch	·	2.7 km	MPC · JPL
771251	2016 EP_{352}	—	March 15, 2016	Mount Lemmon	Mount Lemmon Survey	·	1.9 km	MPC · JPL
771252	2016 EW_{353}	—	March 14, 2016	Mount Lemmon	Mount Lemmon Survey	·	1.6 km	MPC · JPL
771253	2016 EZ_{357}	—	March 4, 2016	Haleakala	Pan-STARRS 1	·	2.4 km	MPC · JPL
771254	2016 EQ_{376}	—	March 11, 2016	Kitt Peak	Spacewatch	·	2.6 km	MPC · JPL
771255	2016 FO	—	March 11, 2016	Haleakala	Pan-STARRS 1	·	1.9 km	MPC · JPL
771256	2016 FU_{2}	—	April 6, 2011	Mount Lemmon	Mount Lemmon Survey	EOS	1.4 km	MPC · JPL
771257	2016 FS_{15}	—	January 25, 2006	Kitt Peak	Spacewatch	·	430 m	MPC · JPL
771258	2016 FY_{16}	—	March 29, 2016	Haleakala	Pan-STARRS 1	·	620 m	MPC · JPL
771259	2016 FX_{22}	—	October 20, 2008	Mount Lemmon	Mount Lemmon Survey	EOS	1.4 km	MPC · JPL
771260	2016 FR_{24}	—	August 14, 2013	Haleakala	Pan-STARRS 1	EOS	1.4 km	MPC · JPL
771261	2016 FS_{24}	—	October 24, 2014	Kitt Peak	Spacewatch	·	860 m	MPC · JPL
771262	2016 FV_{24}	—	October 23, 2013	Mount Lemmon	Mount Lemmon Survey	·	1.9 km	MPC · JPL
771263	2016 FR_{27}	—	March 31, 2016	Mount Lemmon	Mount Lemmon Survey	·	2.0 km	MPC · JPL
771264	2016 FU_{29}	—	December 21, 2014	Haleakala	Pan-STARRS 1	EOS	1.3 km	MPC · JPL
771265	2016 FG_{30}	—	October 23, 2013	Mount Lemmon	Mount Lemmon Survey	VER	2.0 km	MPC · JPL
771266	2016 FN_{34}	—	September 21, 2012	Mount Lemmon	Mount Lemmon Survey	·	2.8 km	MPC · JPL
771267	2016 FT_{35}	—	March 10, 2016	Haleakala	Pan-STARRS 1	EOS	1.4 km	MPC · JPL
771268	2016 FJ_{37}	—	March 8, 2005	Mount Lemmon	Mount Lemmon Survey	·	2.1 km	MPC · JPL
771269	2016 FV_{39}	—	September 19, 2003	Kitt Peak	Spacewatch	·	1.4 km	MPC · JPL
771270	2016 FD_{40}	—	October 5, 2013	Haleakala	Pan-STARRS 1	EOS	1.5 km	MPC · JPL
771271	2016 FH_{40}	—	March 30, 2016	Haleakala	Pan-STARRS 1	·	1.9 km	MPC · JPL
771272	2016 FP_{41}	—	November 21, 2014	Haleakala	Pan-STARRS 1	·	1.4 km	MPC · JPL
771273	2016 FM_{45}	—	March 10, 2016	Haleakala	Pan-STARRS 1	·	2.2 km	MPC · JPL
771274	2016 FU_{48}	—	March 31, 2016	Haleakala	Pan-STARRS 1	·	2.2 km	MPC · JPL
771275	2016 FO_{49}	—	March 1, 2011	Mount Lemmon	Mount Lemmon Survey	·	1.4 km	MPC · JPL
771276	2016 FU_{50}	—	September 18, 2012	Kitt Peak	Spacewatch	·	2.8 km	MPC · JPL
771277	2016 FK_{51}	—	October 5, 2013	Haleakala	Pan-STARRS 1	·	2.2 km	MPC · JPL
771278	2016 FG_{55}	—	January 30, 2006	Kitt Peak	Spacewatch	·	420 m	MPC · JPL
771279	2016 FL_{56}	—	October 27, 2013	Haleakala	Pan-STARRS 1	WAT	1.3 km	MPC · JPL
771280	2016 FY_{61}	—	March 16, 2016	Haleakala	Pan-STARRS 1	·	2.1 km	MPC · JPL
771281	2016 FW_{62}	—	March 31, 2016	Haleakala	Pan-STARRS 1	·	2.2 km	MPC · JPL
771282	2016 FJ_{63}	—	March 30, 2016	Haleakala	Pan-STARRS 1	EOS	1.5 km	MPC · JPL
771283	2016 FY_{63}	—	March 18, 2016	Mount Lemmon	Mount Lemmon Survey	·	1.1 km	MPC · JPL
771284	2016 FW_{65}	—	December 21, 2014	Haleakala	Pan-STARRS 1	·	2.0 km	MPC · JPL
771285	2016 FO_{66}	—	January 16, 2015	Mount Lemmon	Mount Lemmon Survey	·	1.8 km	MPC · JPL
771286	2016 FB_{67}	—	December 21, 2014	Haleakala	Pan-STARRS 1	·	2.3 km	MPC · JPL
771287	2016 FF_{67}	—	December 29, 2014	Haleakala	Pan-STARRS 1	·	2.4 km	MPC · JPL
771288	2016 FT_{68}	—	March 31, 2016	Haleakala	Pan-STARRS 1	·	530 m	MPC · JPL
771289	2016 FA_{74}	—	March 14, 2016	Bergisch Gladbach	W. Bickel	·	1.8 km	MPC · JPL
771290	2016 FD_{77}	—	March 16, 2016	Haleakala	Pan-STARRS 1	·	2.4 km	MPC · JPL
771291	2016 FF_{77}	—	March 16, 2016	Haleakala	Pan-STARRS 1	·	2.4 km	MPC · JPL
771292	2016 FK_{77}	—	March 16, 2016	Haleakala	Pan-STARRS 1	BRA	1.3 km	MPC · JPL
771293	2016 FT_{77}	—	March 27, 2016	Mount Lemmon	Mount Lemmon Survey	·	2.0 km	MPC · JPL
771294	2016 FA_{78}	—	March 30, 2016	Haleakala	Pan-STARRS 1	EOS	1.6 km	MPC · JPL
771295	2016 FE_{78}	—	March 28, 2016	Mount Lemmon	Mount Lemmon Survey	·	1.5 km	MPC · JPL
771296	2016 FF_{79}	—	November 20, 2014	Mount Lemmon	Mount Lemmon Survey	·	1.4 km	MPC · JPL
771297	2016 FA_{82}	—	March 16, 2016	Haleakala	Pan-STARRS 1	·	2.3 km	MPC · JPL
771298	2016 FD_{82}	—	March 27, 2016	Mount Lemmon	Mount Lemmon Survey	EOS	1.5 km	MPC · JPL
771299	2016 FS_{83}	—	March 31, 2016	Haleakala	Pan-STARRS 1	·	2.0 km	MPC · JPL
771300	2016 FT_{83}	—	March 31, 2016	Haleakala	Pan-STARRS 1	·	1.7 km	MPC · JPL

== 771301–771400 ==
back to top

Designation			Discovery			Properties		Ref
Permanent	Provisional	Named after	Date	Site	Discoverer(s)	Category	Diam.	Ref
771301	2016 FU_{86}	—	December 21, 2014	Haleakala	Pan-STARRS 1	EOS	1.6 km	MPC · JPL
771302	2016 FP_{98}	—	March 16, 2016	Haleakala	Pan-STARRS 1	·	2.8 km	MPC · JPL
771303	2016 FP_{99}	—	March 16, 2016	Haleakala	Pan-STARRS 1	·	2.5 km	MPC · JPL
771304	2016 FY_{100}	—	January 18, 2015	Mount Lemmon	Mount Lemmon Survey	EOS	1.3 km	MPC · JPL
771305	2016 FH_{101}	—	March 30, 2016	Haleakala	Pan-STARRS 1	VER	2.1 km	MPC · JPL
771306	2016 FJ_{128}	—	March 28, 2016	Cerro Tololo	DECam	·	1.9 km	MPC · JPL
771307	2016 FZ_{129}	—	October 10, 2008	Mount Lemmon	Mount Lemmon Survey	·	1.6 km	MPC · JPL
771308	2016 FM_{150}	—	March 28, 2016	Cerro Tololo	DECam	·	2.3 km	MPC · JPL
771309	2016 FS_{151}	—	March 28, 2016	Cerro Tololo	DECam	T_{j} (2.92)	5.0 km	MPC · JPL
771310	2016 FJ_{165}	—	November 17, 2007	Kitt Peak	Spacewatch	·	630 m	MPC · JPL
771311	2016 FM_{173}	—	March 31, 2016	Haleakala	Pan-STARRS 1	·	2.6 km	MPC · JPL
771312	2016 FL_{192}	—	March 17, 2016	Mount Lemmon	Mount Lemmon Survey	·	2.4 km	MPC · JPL
771313	2016 GD_{13}	—	April 1, 2016	Mount Lemmon	Mount Lemmon Survey	·	730 m	MPC · JPL
771314	2016 GE_{13}	—	September 23, 2008	Mount Lemmon	Mount Lemmon Survey	·	1.5 km	MPC · JPL
771315	2016 GR_{13}	—	October 23, 2008	Mount Lemmon	Mount Lemmon Survey	·	1.9 km	MPC · JPL
771316	2016 GR_{18}	—	March 10, 2016	Haleakala	Pan-STARRS 1	·	2.2 km	MPC · JPL
771317	2016 GR_{21}	—	October 3, 2013	Haleakala	Pan-STARRS 1	EOS	1.4 km	MPC · JPL
771318	2016 GS_{23}	—	December 26, 2009	Kitt Peak	Spacewatch	·	1.8 km	MPC · JPL
771319	2016 GK_{28}	—	April 12, 2013	Haleakala	Pan-STARRS 1	·	500 m	MPC · JPL
771320	2016 GR_{35}	—	October 5, 2013	Mount Lemmon	Mount Lemmon Survey	·	1.7 km	MPC · JPL
771321	2016 GC_{36}	—	November 26, 2014	Haleakala	Pan-STARRS 1	EOS	1.4 km	MPC · JPL
771322	2016 GS_{36}	—	September 28, 2003	Kitt Peak	Spacewatch	·	1.4 km	MPC · JPL
771323	2016 GB_{38}	—	November 21, 2008	Kitt Peak	Spacewatch	·	1.8 km	MPC · JPL
771324	2016 GT_{40}	—	January 18, 2016	Haleakala	Pan-STARRS 1	·	1.5 km	MPC · JPL
771325	2016 GL_{41}	—	September 1, 2013	Haleakala	Pan-STARRS 1	·	1.3 km	MPC · JPL
771326	2016 GO_{41}	—	March 13, 2016	Haleakala	Pan-STARRS 1	THM	1.8 km	MPC · JPL
771327	2016 GJ_{42}	—	March 10, 2016	Haleakala	Pan-STARRS 1	·	1.0 km	MPC · JPL
771328	2016 GG_{44}	—	November 2, 2007	Mount Lemmon	Mount Lemmon Survey	·	750 m	MPC · JPL
771329	2016 GO_{46}	—	December 12, 2014	Cerro Paranal	Gaia Ground Based Optical Tracking	·	1.5 km	MPC · JPL
771330	2016 GE_{49}	—	November 1, 2013	Mount Lemmon	Mount Lemmon Survey	EOS	1.4 km	MPC · JPL
771331	2016 GO_{50}	—	September 24, 2013	Mount Lemmon	Mount Lemmon Survey	EOS	1.2 km	MPC · JPL
771332	2016 GO_{51}	—	April 1, 2016	Haleakala	Pan-STARRS 1	·	2.1 km	MPC · JPL
771333	2016 GP_{51}	—	March 4, 2016	Haleakala	Pan-STARRS 1	·	1.3 km	MPC · JPL
771334	2016 GT_{60}	—	March 13, 2016	Haleakala	Pan-STARRS 1	EOS	1.5 km	MPC · JPL
771335	2016 GK_{61}	—	February 4, 2005	Mount Lemmon	Mount Lemmon Survey	·	1.5 km	MPC · JPL
771336	2016 GG_{62}	—	March 10, 2016	Haleakala	Pan-STARRS 1	EOS	1.4 km	MPC · JPL
771337	2016 GV_{69}	—	October 5, 2013	Haleakala	Pan-STARRS 1	KOR	1.0 km	MPC · JPL
771338	2016 GP_{73}	—	October 12, 2007	Kitt Peak	Spacewatch	THM	2.1 km	MPC · JPL
771339	2016 GH_{74}	—	March 10, 2016	Haleakala	Pan-STARRS 1	·	2.4 km	MPC · JPL
771340	2016 GZ_{74}	—	March 31, 2016	Mount Lemmon	Mount Lemmon Survey	EOS	1.2 km	MPC · JPL
771341	2016 GU_{79}	—	November 9, 2013	Mount Lemmon	Mount Lemmon Survey	·	2.0 km	MPC · JPL
771342	2016 GJ_{81}	—	September 1, 2013	Mount Lemmon	Mount Lemmon Survey	·	1.4 km	MPC · JPL
771343	2016 GL_{84}	—	May 8, 2011	Mount Lemmon	Mount Lemmon Survey	·	1.9 km	MPC · JPL
771344	2016 GR_{84}	—	December 17, 2007	Mount Lemmon	Mount Lemmon Survey	NYS	840 m	MPC · JPL
771345	2016 GR_{85}	—	April 1, 2016	Haleakala	Pan-STARRS 1	·	2.1 km	MPC · JPL
771346	2016 GS_{86}	—	April 20, 2009	Kitt Peak	Spacewatch	NYS	590 m	MPC · JPL
771347	2016 GR_{88}	—	June 1, 2011	Bergisch Gladbach	W. Bickel	·	2.1 km	MPC · JPL
771348	2016 GW_{88}	—	September 13, 2013	Mount Lemmon	Mount Lemmon Survey	·	2.5 km	MPC · JPL
771349	2016 GY_{90}	—	September 23, 2008	Mount Lemmon	Mount Lemmon Survey	·	1.6 km	MPC · JPL
771350	2016 GC_{91}	—	February 17, 2010	Kitt Peak	Spacewatch	·	2.1 km	MPC · JPL
771351	2016 GO_{91}	—	February 13, 2010	Mount Lemmon	Mount Lemmon Survey	·	2.0 km	MPC · JPL
771352	2016 GM_{93}	—	May 18, 2013	Mount Lemmon	Mount Lemmon Survey	·	610 m	MPC · JPL
771353	2016 GH_{98}	—	November 6, 2005	Kitt Peak	Spacewatch	·	1 km	MPC · JPL
771354	2016 GN_{98}	—	November 18, 2008	Kitt Peak	Spacewatch	THM	1.8 km	MPC · JPL
771355	2016 GV_{99}	—	October 3, 2013	Kitt Peak	Spacewatch	VER	2.2 km	MPC · JPL
771356	2016 GV_{104}	—	April 1, 2016	Haleakala	Pan-STARRS 1	L4	6.1 km	MPC · JPL
771357	2016 GW_{105}	—	March 10, 2016	Haleakala	Pan-STARRS 1	THM	2.0 km	MPC · JPL
771358	2016 GV_{108}	—	May 27, 2009	Mount Lemmon	Mount Lemmon Survey	MAS	550 m	MPC · JPL
771359	2016 GE_{109}	—	September 12, 2007	Mount Lemmon	Mount Lemmon Survey	EOS	1.5 km	MPC · JPL
771360	2016 GM_{109}	—	January 6, 2010	Mount Lemmon	Mount Lemmon Survey	·	1.3 km	MPC · JPL
771361	2016 GV_{109}	—	March 11, 2016	Haleakala	Pan-STARRS 1	·	770 m	MPC · JPL
771362	2016 GY_{113}	—	January 13, 2015	Haleakala	Pan-STARRS 1	KOR	990 m	MPC · JPL
771363	2016 GZ_{113}	—	September 14, 2013	Haleakala	Pan-STARRS 1	·	1.8 km	MPC · JPL
771364	2016 GP_{117}	—	June 6, 2011	Haleakala	Pan-STARRS 1	·	2.0 km	MPC · JPL
771365	2016 GM_{123}	—	February 15, 2010	Kitt Peak	Spacewatch	·	2.4 km	MPC · JPL
771366	2016 GZ_{125}	—	January 23, 2006	Kitt Peak	Spacewatch	·	470 m	MPC · JPL
771367	2016 GH_{126}	—	April 16, 2005	Kitt Peak	Spacewatch	·	2.6 km	MPC · JPL
771368	2016 GO_{127}	—	January 17, 2015	Mount Lemmon	Mount Lemmon Survey	·	2.2 km	MPC · JPL
771369	2016 GV_{128}	—	December 29, 2014	Haleakala	Pan-STARRS 1	·	2.4 km	MPC · JPL
771370	2016 GU_{129}	—	October 6, 2008	Kitt Peak	Spacewatch	·	1.6 km	MPC · JPL
771371	2016 GP_{130}	—	November 21, 2014	Haleakala	Pan-STARRS 1	·	1.5 km	MPC · JPL
771372	2016 GC_{137}	—	March 10, 2016	Haleakala	Pan-STARRS 1	·	640 m	MPC · JPL
771373	2016 GH_{140}	—	August 13, 2012	Haleakala	Pan-STARRS 1	EOS	1.5 km	MPC · JPL
771374	2016 GA_{142}	—	January 8, 2016	Haleakala	Pan-STARRS 1	·	2.1 km	MPC · JPL
771375	2016 GV_{146}	—	October 9, 2008	Mount Lemmon	Mount Lemmon Survey	EOS	1.4 km	MPC · JPL
771376	2016 GT_{147}	—	March 10, 2016	Haleakala	Pan-STARRS 1	·	2.0 km	MPC · JPL
771377	2016 GU_{147}	—	October 27, 2008	Kitt Peak	Spacewatch	·	1.8 km	MPC · JPL
771378	2016 GT_{149}	—	May 9, 2011	Mount Lemmon	Mount Lemmon Survey	EOS	1.4 km	MPC · JPL
771379	2016 GG_{150}	—	September 14, 2006	Kitt Peak	Spacewatch	·	2.2 km	MPC · JPL
771380	2016 GR_{151}	—	July 14, 2013	Haleakala	Pan-STARRS 1	NYS	870 m	MPC · JPL
771381	2016 GH_{153}	—	April 3, 2016	Mount Lemmon	Mount Lemmon Survey	·	1.5 km	MPC · JPL
771382	2016 GL_{154}	—	April 3, 2016	Mount Lemmon	Mount Lemmon Survey	·	1.6 km	MPC · JPL
771383	2016 GQ_{154}	—	April 12, 2011	Mount Lemmon	Mount Lemmon Survey	EOS	1.6 km	MPC · JPL
771384	2016 GM_{155}	—	April 3, 2016	Mount Lemmon	Mount Lemmon Survey	·	1.7 km	MPC · JPL
771385	2016 GY_{156}	—	April 3, 2016	Haleakala	Pan-STARRS 1	·	1.9 km	MPC · JPL
771386	2016 GD_{157}	—	November 2, 2010	Mount Lemmon	Mount Lemmon Survey	·	630 m	MPC · JPL
771387	2016 GZ_{159}	—	March 14, 2016	Mount Lemmon	Mount Lemmon Survey	·	1.5 km	MPC · JPL
771388	2016 GC_{162}	—	November 4, 2013	Mount Lemmon	Mount Lemmon Survey	·	2.3 km	MPC · JPL
771389	2016 GP_{163}	—	September 26, 2013	Mount Lemmon	Mount Lemmon Survey	·	2.2 km	MPC · JPL
771390	2016 GD_{164}	—	March 10, 2016	Haleakala	Pan-STARRS 1	·	1.1 km	MPC · JPL
771391	2016 GC_{165}	—	October 9, 2010	Kitt Peak	Spacewatch	V	360 m	MPC · JPL
771392	2016 GN_{166}	—	March 14, 2005	Mount Lemmon	Mount Lemmon Survey	·	2.1 km	MPC · JPL
771393	2016 GS_{166}	—	April 6, 2005	Mount Lemmon	Mount Lemmon Survey	·	770 m	MPC · JPL
771394	2016 GX_{166}	—	January 21, 2015	Haleakala	Pan-STARRS 1	VER	2.1 km	MPC · JPL
771395	2016 GT_{167}	—	January 17, 2015	Haleakala	Pan-STARRS 1	·	2.3 km	MPC · JPL
771396	2016 GN_{170}	—	November 8, 2008	Mount Lemmon	Mount Lemmon Survey	·	2.0 km	MPC · JPL
771397	2016 GD_{171}	—	October 28, 2014	Haleakala	Pan-STARRS 1	·	510 m	MPC · JPL
771398	2016 GY_{172}	—	April 3, 2016	Haleakala	Pan-STARRS 1	·	2.3 km	MPC · JPL
771399	2016 GO_{173}	—	April 3, 2016	Haleakala	Pan-STARRS 1	L4	6.8 km	MPC · JPL
771400	2016 GL_{174}	—	January 17, 2015	Haleakala	Pan-STARRS 1	·	2.0 km	MPC · JPL

== 771401–771500 ==
back to top

Designation			Discovery			Properties		Ref
Permanent	Provisional	Named after	Date	Site	Discoverer(s)	Category	Diam.	Ref
771401	2016 GB_{176}	—	September 25, 2013	Catalina	CSS	ERI	1.3 km	MPC · JPL
771402	2016 GD_{178}	—	January 14, 2011	Kitt Peak	Spacewatch	·	1.1 km	MPC · JPL
771403	2016 GN_{180}	—	January 18, 2015	Mount Lemmon	Mount Lemmon Survey	·	1.4 km	MPC · JPL
771404	2016 GS_{181}	—	January 23, 2011	Mount Lemmon	Mount Lemmon Survey	·	900 m	MPC · JPL
771405	2016 GW_{181}	—	May 8, 2011	Kitt Peak	Spacewatch	·	1.6 km	MPC · JPL
771406	2016 GH_{182}	—	December 29, 2014	Haleakala	Pan-STARRS 1	EOS	1.4 km	MPC · JPL
771407	2016 GM_{182}	—	September 14, 2013	Haleakala	Pan-STARRS 1	·	1.4 km	MPC · JPL
771408	2016 GF_{183}	—	January 20, 2015	Haleakala	Pan-STARRS 1	·	2.2 km	MPC · JPL
771409	2016 GG_{183}	—	January 14, 2015	Haleakala	Pan-STARRS 1	·	1.6 km	MPC · JPL
771410	2016 GU_{183}	—	November 10, 2013	Mount Lemmon	Mount Lemmon Survey	EOS	1.5 km	MPC · JPL
771411	2016 GA_{184}	—	August 26, 2012	Haleakala	Pan-STARRS 1	·	1.9 km	MPC · JPL
771412	2016 GD_{185}	—	January 22, 2015	Haleakala	Pan-STARRS 1	·	2.2 km	MPC · JPL
771413	2016 GX_{187}	—	November 3, 2010	Mount Lemmon	Mount Lemmon Survey	·	570 m	MPC · JPL
771414	2016 GN_{194}	—	November 9, 2013	Mount Lemmon	Mount Lemmon Survey	·	2.1 km	MPC · JPL
771415	2016 GD_{197}	—	September 27, 2006	Kitt Peak	Spacewatch	T_{j} (2.99)	2.7 km	MPC · JPL
771416	2016 GP_{199}	—	December 4, 2008	Kitt Peak	Spacewatch	·	490 m	MPC · JPL
771417	2016 GJ_{202}	—	May 13, 2011	Kitt Peak	Spacewatch	·	2.2 km	MPC · JPL
771418	2016 GO_{203}	—	November 9, 2013	Mount Lemmon	Mount Lemmon Survey	·	2.2 km	MPC · JPL
771419	2016 GG_{207}	—	November 20, 2014	Haleakala	Pan-STARRS 1	DOR	1.7 km	MPC · JPL
771420	2016 GD_{208}	—	February 11, 2016	Haleakala	Pan-STARRS 1	EOS	1.4 km	MPC · JPL
771421	2016 GL_{208}	—	February 11, 2016	Haleakala	Pan-STARRS 1	·	1.8 km	MPC · JPL
771422	2016 GM_{208}	—	February 5, 2016	Haleakala	Pan-STARRS 1	·	1.9 km	MPC · JPL
771423	2016 GO_{208}	—	August 6, 2012	Haleakala	Pan-STARRS 1	·	2.2 km	MPC · JPL
771424	2016 GJ_{211}	—	March 31, 2016	Mount Lemmon	Mount Lemmon Survey	EOS	1.5 km	MPC · JPL
771425	2016 GB_{212}	—	September 14, 2010	Mount Lemmon	Mount Lemmon Survey	·	510 m	MPC · JPL
771426	2016 GZ_{212}	—	January 7, 2010	Kitt Peak	Spacewatch	·	1.4 km	MPC · JPL
771427	2016 GJ_{222}	—	September 17, 2014	Haleakala	Pan-STARRS 1	H	340 m	MPC · JPL
771428	2016 GB_{226}	—	March 13, 2016	Haleakala	Pan-STARRS 1	HYG	2.0 km	MPC · JPL
771429	2016 GG_{227}	—	November 22, 2014	Mount Lemmon	Mount Lemmon Survey	·	520 m	MPC · JPL
771430	2016 GS_{230}	—	November 28, 2011	Mount Lemmon	Mount Lemmon Survey	·	530 m	MPC · JPL
771431	2016 GT_{232}	—	April 14, 2016	Haleakala	Pan-STARRS 1	EOS	1.4 km	MPC · JPL
771432	2016 GG_{233}	—	April 14, 2016	Mount Lemmon	Mount Lemmon Survey	·	2.5 km	MPC · JPL
771433	2016 GF_{236}	—	March 15, 2015	Haleakala	Pan-STARRS 1	·	2.4 km	MPC · JPL
771434	2016 GC_{245}	—	February 15, 2010	Kitt Peak	Spacewatch	·	2.0 km	MPC · JPL
771435	2016 GT_{250}	—	March 4, 2016	Haleakala	Pan-STARRS 1	·	1.6 km	MPC · JPL
771436	2016 GX_{252}	—	January 28, 2015	Haleakala	Pan-STARRS 1	L4	7.1 km	MPC · JPL
771437	2016 GS_{256}	—	April 11, 2016	Haleakala	Pan-STARRS 1	·	2.7 km	MPC · JPL
771438	2016 GH_{257}	—	April 5, 2016	Haleakala	Pan-STARRS 1	·	1.0 km	MPC · JPL
771439	2016 GB_{259}	—	April 3, 2016	Haleakala	Pan-STARRS 1	·	1.1 km	MPC · JPL
771440	2016 GX_{259}	—	January 20, 2015	Haleakala	Pan-STARRS 1	·	2.2 km	MPC · JPL
771441	2016 GD_{261}	—	October 2, 2013	Haleakala	Pan-STARRS 1	·	1.7 km	MPC · JPL
771442	2016 GH_{262}	—	December 16, 2014	Haleakala	Pan-STARRS 1	·	1.9 km	MPC · JPL
771443	2016 GR_{262}	—	March 9, 2005	Kitt Peak	Spacewatch	·	2.0 km	MPC · JPL
771444	2016 GT_{262}	—	April 3, 2016	Haleakala	Pan-STARRS 1	·	2.6 km	MPC · JPL
771445	2016 GG_{264}	—	January 20, 2015	Mount Lemmon	Mount Lemmon Survey	VER	2.1 km	MPC · JPL
771446	2016 GM_{267}	—	April 14, 2016	Haleakala	Pan-STARRS 1	·	3.2 km	MPC · JPL
771447	2016 GE_{268}	—	February 2, 2006	Mount Lemmon	Mount Lemmon Survey	·	1.4 km	MPC · JPL
771448	2016 GE_{271}	—	April 10, 2016	Haleakala	Pan-STARRS 1	·	1.5 km	MPC · JPL
771449	2016 GC_{272}	—	April 1, 2016	Haleakala	Pan-STARRS 1	V	480 m	MPC · JPL
771450	2016 GG_{273}	—	April 10, 2016	Haleakala	Pan-STARRS 1	H	260 m	MPC · JPL
771451	2016 GB_{274}	—	April 3, 2016	Mount Lemmon	Mount Lemmon Survey	·	1.8 km	MPC · JPL
771452	2016 GF_{274}	—	April 3, 2016	Haleakala	Pan-STARRS 1	·	2.6 km	MPC · JPL
771453	2016 GX_{274}	—	October 4, 2007	Kitt Peak	Spacewatch	·	2.4 km	MPC · JPL
771454	2016 GA_{275}	—	April 2, 2016	Mount Lemmon	Mount Lemmon Survey	·	2.3 km	MPC · JPL
771455	2016 GF_{277}	—	April 1, 2016	Haleakala	Pan-STARRS 1	KOR	1.0 km	MPC · JPL
771456	2016 GW_{277}	—	April 15, 2016	Cerro Paranal	Gaia Ground Based Optical Tracking	·	2.2 km	MPC · JPL
771457	2016 GS_{279}	—	April 14, 2016	Haleakala	Pan-STARRS 1	·	2.4 km	MPC · JPL
771458	2016 GA_{280}	—	April 14, 2016	Haleakala	Pan-STARRS 1	·	1.9 km	MPC · JPL
771459	2016 GE_{284}	—	March 19, 2010	Mount Lemmon	Mount Lemmon Survey	VER	2.0 km	MPC · JPL
771460	2016 GJ_{284}	—	April 1, 2016	Haleakala	Pan-STARRS 1	·	510 m	MPC · JPL
771461	2016 GH_{285}	—	April 3, 2016	Haleakala	Pan-STARRS 1	·	1.6 km	MPC · JPL
771462	2016 GT_{285}	—	April 1, 2016	Haleakala	Pan-STARRS 1	·	2.2 km	MPC · JPL
771463	2016 GF_{286}	—	April 1, 2016	Mount Lemmon	Mount Lemmon Survey	·	2.0 km	MPC · JPL
771464	2016 GG_{286}	—	April 10, 2016	Haleakala	Pan-STARRS 1	·	2.7 km	MPC · JPL
771465	2016 GL_{287}	—	September 29, 2008	Mount Lemmon	Mount Lemmon Survey	EOS	1.2 km	MPC · JPL
771466	2016 GG_{288}	—	April 12, 2016	Haleakala	Pan-STARRS 1	·	1.1 km	MPC · JPL
771467	2016 GP_{288}	—	April 1, 2016	Haleakala	Pan-STARRS 1	L4	8.0 km	MPC · JPL
771468	2016 GX_{290}	—	April 3, 2016	Haleakala	Pan-STARRS 1	·	1.0 km	MPC · JPL
771469	2016 GP_{296}	—	April 12, 2016	Haleakala	Pan-STARRS 1	·	530 m	MPC · JPL
771470	2016 GG_{298}	—	April 3, 2016	Haleakala	Pan-STARRS 1	·	1.8 km	MPC · JPL
771471	2016 GX_{298}	—	April 1, 2016	Haleakala	Pan-STARRS 1	EOS	1.3 km	MPC · JPL
771472	2016 GA_{300}	—	April 10, 2016	Haleakala	Pan-STARRS 1	·	1.1 km	MPC · JPL
771473	2016 GB_{300}	—	April 1, 2016	Haleakala	Pan-STARRS 1	·	1.4 km	MPC · JPL
771474	2016 GP_{301}	—	April 10, 2016	Haleakala	Pan-STARRS 1	L4	6.3 km	MPC · JPL
771475	2016 GS_{301}	—	April 2, 2016	Mount Lemmon	Mount Lemmon Survey	·	1.6 km	MPC · JPL
771476	2016 GG_{302}	—	April 14, 2016	Mount Lemmon	Mount Lemmon Survey	VER	2.1 km	MPC · JPL
771477	2016 GT_{302}	—	April 1, 2016	Haleakala	Pan-STARRS 1	KOR	1.0 km	MPC · JPL
771478	2016 GQ_{305}	—	April 10, 2016	Haleakala	Pan-STARRS 1	·	1.9 km	MPC · JPL
771479	2016 GA_{306}	—	October 9, 2010	Mount Lemmon	Mount Lemmon Survey	·	490 m	MPC · JPL
771480	2016 GK_{306}	—	April 5, 2016	Haleakala	Pan-STARRS 1	·	1.6 km	MPC · JPL
771481	2016 GW_{306}	—	April 1, 2016	Haleakala	Pan-STARRS 1	VER	2.1 km	MPC · JPL
771482	2016 GN_{307}	—	April 12, 2016	Haleakala	Pan-STARRS 1	·	1.6 km	MPC · JPL
771483	2016 GU_{308}	—	April 12, 2016	Haleakala	Pan-STARRS 1	HYG	2.3 km	MPC · JPL
771484	2016 GD_{310}	—	November 9, 2013	Haleakala	Pan-STARRS 1	VER	2.2 km	MPC · JPL
771485	2016 GE_{310}	—	April 10, 2016	Haleakala	Pan-STARRS 1	·	2.4 km	MPC · JPL
771486	2016 GK_{312}	—	April 3, 2016	Haleakala	Pan-STARRS 1	·	2.3 km	MPC · JPL
771487	2016 GL_{312}	—	December 29, 2014	Mount Lemmon	Mount Lemmon Survey	·	1.5 km	MPC · JPL
771488	2016 GP_{313}	—	April 3, 2016	Haleakala	Pan-STARRS 1	·	1.3 km	MPC · JPL
771489	2016 GO_{315}	—	November 9, 2013	Haleakala	Pan-STARRS 1	·	2.5 km	MPC · JPL
771490	2016 GU_{317}	—	October 20, 2007	Mount Lemmon	Mount Lemmon Survey	VER	2.0 km	MPC · JPL
771491	2016 GE_{319}	—	January 13, 2015	Haleakala	Pan-STARRS 1	·	2.2 km	MPC · JPL
771492	2016 GG_{334}	—	April 2, 2016	Haleakala	Pan-STARRS 1	EMA	2.5 km	MPC · JPL
771493	2016 GS_{334}	—	April 5, 2016	Haleakala	Pan-STARRS 1	·	2.1 km	MPC · JPL
771494	2016 GX_{334}	—	April 1, 2016	Mount Lemmon	Mount Lemmon Survey	·	2.1 km	MPC · JPL
771495	2016 GC_{335}	—	January 16, 2015	Haleakala	Pan-STARRS 1	·	2.3 km	MPC · JPL
771496	2016 GZ_{340}	—	October 8, 2007	Mount Lemmon	Mount Lemmon Survey	·	2.4 km	MPC · JPL
771497	2016 GM_{346}	—	January 18, 2015	Mount Lemmon	Mount Lemmon Survey	HOF	1.8 km	MPC · JPL
771498	2016 GT_{347}	—	October 6, 2007	Kitt Peak	Spacewatch	·	2.1 km	MPC · JPL
771499	2016 GN_{355}	—	December 29, 2008	Kitt Peak	Spacewatch	·	530 m	MPC · JPL
771500	2016 GA_{356}	—	November 17, 2014	Haleakala	Pan-STARRS 1	·	2.0 km	MPC · JPL

== 771501–771600 ==
back to top

Designation			Discovery			Properties		Ref
Permanent	Provisional	Named after	Date	Site	Discoverer(s)	Category	Diam.	Ref
771501	2016 GQ_{356}	—	January 19, 2015	Mount Lemmon	Mount Lemmon Survey	·	2.3 km	MPC · JPL
771502	2016 HF_{1}	—	January 27, 2012	Kitt Peak	Spacewatch	·	870 m	MPC · JPL
771503	2016 HX_{4}	—	May 4, 2009	Mount Lemmon	Mount Lemmon Survey	·	750 m	MPC · JPL
771504	2016 HM_{6}	—	March 11, 2005	Mount Lemmon	Mount Lemmon Survey	EOS	1.3 km	MPC · JPL
771505	2016 HU_{7}	—	April 28, 2016	Mount Lemmon	Mount Lemmon Survey	·	720 m	MPC · JPL
771506	2016 HR_{11}	—	November 30, 2014	Haleakala	Pan-STARRS 1	BRA	1.1 km	MPC · JPL
771507	2016 HV_{16}	—	January 31, 2009	Kitt Peak	Spacewatch	·	560 m	MPC · JPL
771508	2016 HP_{17}	—	December 21, 2014	Haleakala	Pan-STARRS 1	·	2.0 km	MPC · JPL
771509	2016 HQ_{17}	—	March 5, 2016	Haleakala	Pan-STARRS 1	·	1.7 km	MPC · JPL
771510	2016 HN_{20}	—	June 5, 2011	Mount Lemmon	Mount Lemmon Survey	·	2.3 km	MPC · JPL
771511	2016 HU_{24}	—	January 18, 2015	Mount Lemmon	Mount Lemmon Survey	·	1.3 km	MPC · JPL
771512	2016 HO_{25}	—	November 21, 2008	Kitt Peak	Spacewatch	·	1.9 km	MPC · JPL
771513	2016 HC_{26}	—	October 18, 2012	Haleakala	Pan-STARRS 1	·	2.1 km	MPC · JPL
771514	2016 HM_{29}	—	April 16, 2016	Haleakala	Pan-STARRS 1	NYS	840 m	MPC · JPL
771515	2016 HN_{29}	—	April 29, 2016	Mount Lemmon	Mount Lemmon Survey	HNS	830 m	MPC · JPL
771516	2016 HE_{30}	—	April 16, 2016	Haleakala	Pan-STARRS 1	·	670 m	MPC · JPL
771517	2016 HN_{35}	—	November 27, 2013	Mount Lemmon	Mount Lemmon Survey	·	2.3 km	MPC · JPL
771518	2016 HA_{38}	—	October 25, 2013	Mount Lemmon	Mount Lemmon Survey	·	1.3 km	MPC · JPL
771519	2016 HG_{38}	—	November 28, 2013	Mount Lemmon	Mount Lemmon Survey	·	2.3 km	MPC · JPL
771520	2016 JB_{2}	—	March 13, 2016	Haleakala	Pan-STARRS 1	·	500 m	MPC · JPL
771521	2016 JW_{6}	—	April 5, 2016	Haleakala	Pan-STARRS 1	·	750 m	MPC · JPL
771522	2016 JC_{7}	—	December 29, 2014	Haleakala	Pan-STARRS 1	·	2.4 km	MPC · JPL
771523	2016 JR_{11}	—	March 17, 2016	Haleakala	Pan-STARRS 1	·	2.4 km	MPC · JPL
771524	2016 JM_{16}	—	November 8, 2013	Mount Lemmon	Mount Lemmon Survey	·	2.3 km	MPC · JPL
771525	2016 JE_{19}	—	March 14, 2015	Haleakala	Pan-STARRS 1	L4	7.6 km	MPC · JPL
771526	2016 JL_{19}	—	May 6, 2016	Bergisch Gladbach	W. Bickel	EOS	1.5 km	MPC · JPL
771527	2016 JV_{19}	—	March 18, 2010	Mount Lemmon	Mount Lemmon Survey	·	2.1 km	MPC · JPL
771528	2016 JJ_{21}	—	November 4, 2013	Mount Lemmon	Mount Lemmon Survey	·	1.6 km	MPC · JPL
771529	2016 JX_{21}	—	January 21, 2015	Haleakala	Pan-STARRS 1	·	2.4 km	MPC · JPL
771530	2016 JP_{22}	—	October 2, 2006	Mount Lemmon	Mount Lemmon Survey	·	750 m	MPC · JPL
771531	2016 JV_{23}	—	March 17, 2016	Haleakala	Pan-STARRS 1	·	1.8 km	MPC · JPL
771532	2016 JK_{24}	—	March 3, 2016	Haleakala	Pan-STARRS 1	damocloid · unusual	10 km	MPC · JPL
771533	2016 JE_{33}	—	December 29, 2008	Kitt Peak	Spacewatch	·	2.4 km	MPC · JPL
771534	2016 JH_{33}	—	September 14, 2013	Mount Lemmon	Mount Lemmon Survey	PHO	730 m	MPC · JPL
771535	2016 JW_{36}	—	May 3, 2016	Haleakala	Pan-STARRS 1	PHO	710 m	MPC · JPL
771536	2016 JM_{39}	—	May 4, 2016	Haleakala	Pan-STARRS 1	H	350 m	MPC · JPL
771537	2016 JG_{41}	—	June 27, 2011	Mount Lemmon	Mount Lemmon Survey	·	2.0 km	MPC · JPL
771538	2016 JZ_{41}	—	December 20, 2014	Haleakala	Pan-STARRS 1	·	2.0 km	MPC · JPL
771539	2016 JF_{42}	—	May 9, 2016	Mount Lemmon	Mount Lemmon Survey	·	2.6 km	MPC · JPL
771540	2016 JS_{42}	—	May 6, 2016	Haleakala	Pan-STARRS 1	·	3.0 km	MPC · JPL
771541	2016 JS_{43}	—	November 6, 2013	Mount Lemmon	Mount Lemmon Survey	·	2.4 km	MPC · JPL
771542	2016 JU_{44}	—	May 5, 2016	Mount Lemmon	Mount Lemmon Survey	·	2.6 km	MPC · JPL
771543	2016 JT_{46}	—	May 3, 2016	Haleakala	Pan-STARRS 1	·	970 m	MPC · JPL
771544	2016 JV_{46}	—	May 13, 2016	Haleakala	Pan-STARRS 1	NYS	820 m	MPC · JPL
771545	2016 JY_{49}	—	May 3, 2016	Mount Lemmon	Mount Lemmon Survey	·	2.6 km	MPC · JPL
771546	2016 JD_{50}	—	January 26, 2015	Haleakala	Pan-STARRS 1	·	2.0 km	MPC · JPL
771547	2016 JO_{50}	—	May 4, 2016	Haleakala	Pan-STARRS 1	·	2.4 km	MPC · JPL
771548	2016 JC_{51}	—	January 21, 2015	Haleakala	Pan-STARRS 1	·	2.0 km	MPC · JPL
771549	2016 JP_{52}	—	May 10, 2016	Mount Lemmon	Mount Lemmon Survey	·	2.1 km	MPC · JPL
771550	2016 JU_{52}	—	May 7, 2016	Haleakala	Pan-STARRS 1	·	470 m	MPC · JPL
771551	2016 JK_{54}	—	May 1, 2016	Haleakala	Pan-STARRS 1	·	1.4 km	MPC · JPL
771552	2016 JQ_{54}	—	May 5, 2016	Mount Lemmon	Mount Lemmon Survey	L4	7.2 km	MPC · JPL
771553	2016 JY_{54}	—	May 4, 2016	Haleakala	Pan-STARRS 1	·	770 m	MPC · JPL
771554	2016 JB_{63}	—	January 27, 2015	Haleakala	Pan-STARRS 1	EOS	1.4 km	MPC · JPL
771555	2016 JD_{73}	—	March 27, 2015	Mount Lemmon	Mount Lemmon Survey	L4	7.5 km	MPC · JPL
771556	2016 KU	—	December 13, 2014	Haleakala	Pan-STARRS 1	·	380 m	MPC · JPL
771557	2016 KE_{4}	—	May 17, 2016	Haleakala	Pan-STARRS 1	H	350 m	MPC · JPL
771558	2016 KH_{8}	—	February 16, 2015	Haleakala	Pan-STARRS 1	·	2.0 km	MPC · JPL
771559	2016 KY_{11}	—	May 30, 2016	Haleakala	Pan-STARRS 1	·	900 m	MPC · JPL
771560	2016 KB_{15}	—	December 29, 2014	Haleakala	Pan-STARRS 1	·	2.7 km	MPC · JPL
771561	2016 LW_{2}	—	May 14, 2005	Kitt Peak	Spacewatch	·	2.6 km	MPC · JPL
771562	2016 LX_{5}	—	April 10, 2016	Haleakala	Pan-STARRS 1	·	2.3 km	MPC · JPL
771563	2016 LN_{17}	—	May 4, 2016	Haleakala	Pan-STARRS 1	·	2.2 km	MPC · JPL
771564	2016 LA_{23}	—	January 17, 2015	Haleakala	Pan-STARRS 1	·	2.5 km	MPC · JPL
771565	2016 LE_{25}	—	October 8, 2012	Haleakala	Pan-STARRS 1	·	2.0 km	MPC · JPL
771566	2016 LA_{27}	—	March 22, 2015	Haleakala	Pan-STARRS 1	URS	2.4 km	MPC · JPL
771567	2016 LQ_{28}	—	November 27, 2013	Haleakala	Pan-STARRS 1	·	2.5 km	MPC · JPL
771568	2016 LR_{29}	—	June 5, 2016	Haleakala	Pan-STARRS 1	EOS	1.4 km	MPC · JPL
771569	2016 LP_{30}	—	March 24, 2012	Mount Lemmon	Mount Lemmon Survey	·	740 m	MPC · JPL
771570	2016 LD_{32}	—	February 18, 2015	Mount Lemmon	Mount Lemmon Survey	·	2.5 km	MPC · JPL
771571	2016 LQ_{35}	—	January 27, 2012	Mount Lemmon	Mount Lemmon Survey	·	580 m	MPC · JPL
771572	2016 LE_{36}	—	October 3, 2013	Haleakala	Pan-STARRS 1	·	570 m	MPC · JPL
771573	2016 LD_{40}	—	August 13, 2012	Haleakala	Pan-STARRS 1	·	1.4 km	MPC · JPL
771574	2016 LL_{45}	—	June 7, 2016	Haleakala	Pan-STARRS 1	·	500 m	MPC · JPL
771575	2016 LE_{46}	—	January 17, 2016	Haleakala	Pan-STARRS 1	·	2.3 km	MPC · JPL
771576	2016 LX_{49}	—	March 29, 2012	Kitt Peak	Spacewatch	·	1.2 km	MPC · JPL
771577	2016 LG_{61}	—	March 29, 2015	Haleakala	Pan-STARRS 1	·	2.5 km	MPC · JPL
771578	2016 LS_{66}	—	January 13, 2004	Kitt Peak	Spacewatch	·	2.1 km	MPC · JPL
771579	2016 LL_{69}	—	June 5, 2016	Haleakala	Pan-STARRS 1	·	2.2 km	MPC · JPL
771580	2016 LN_{70}	—	June 11, 2016	Mount Lemmon	Mount Lemmon Survey	EUP	3.0 km	MPC · JPL
771581	2016 LF_{71}	—	September 15, 2006	Kitt Peak	Spacewatch	THM	1.6 km	MPC · JPL
771582	2016 LS_{76}	—	June 7, 2016	Haleakala	Pan-STARRS 1	·	2.1 km	MPC · JPL
771583	2016 LV_{76}	—	June 5, 2016	Haleakala	Pan-STARRS 1	·	2.2 km	MPC · JPL
771584	2016 LX_{76}	—	June 5, 2016	Haleakala	Pan-STARRS 1	TIR	2.3 km	MPC · JPL
771585	2016 LQ_{79}	—	June 2, 2016	Mount Lemmon	Mount Lemmon Survey	·	890 m	MPC · JPL
771586	2016 LN_{80}	—	June 13, 2016	Haleakala	Pan-STARRS 1	MAS	550 m	MPC · JPL
771587	2016 LQ_{82}	—	June 8, 2016	Haleakala	Pan-STARRS 1	·	1.6 km	MPC · JPL
771588	2016 LE_{83}	—	June 5, 2016	Haleakala	Pan-STARRS 1	·	2.1 km	MPC · JPL
771589	2016 LL_{83}	—	June 5, 2016	Haleakala	Pan-STARRS 1	·	1.5 km	MPC · JPL
771590	2016 LO_{83}	—	June 5, 2016	Haleakala	Pan-STARRS 1	L4	6.5 km	MPC · JPL
771591	2016 LL_{86}	—	June 11, 2016	Mount Lemmon	Mount Lemmon Survey	·	1.8 km	MPC · JPL
771592	2016 LH_{88}	—	June 11, 2016	Mount Lemmon	Mount Lemmon Survey	·	2.0 km	MPC · JPL
771593	2016 LC_{95}	—	June 3, 2016	Haleakala	Pan-STARRS 1	L4	8.8 km	MPC · JPL
771594	2016 LQ_{98}	—	June 3, 2016	Haleakala	Pan-STARRS 1	·	2.7 km	MPC · JPL
771595	2016 LS_{98}	—	June 8, 2016	Haleakala	Pan-STARRS 1	VER	2.1 km	MPC · JPL
771596	2016 LZ_{98}	—	June 12, 2016	Mount Lemmon	Mount Lemmon Survey	·	2.3 km	MPC · JPL
771597	2016 MW_{1}	—	April 11, 2016	Haleakala	Pan-STARRS 1	·	1.8 km	MPC · JPL
771598	2016 NG_{4}	—	May 20, 2012	Mount Lemmon	Mount Lemmon Survey	·	920 m	MPC · JPL
771599	2016 NW_{4}	—	July 3, 2016	Mount Lemmon	Mount Lemmon Survey	·	580 m	MPC · JPL
771600	2016 NT_{5}	—	July 3, 2016	Mount Lemmon	Mount Lemmon Survey	·	2.7 km	MPC · JPL

== 771601–771700 ==
back to top

Designation			Discovery			Properties		Ref
Permanent	Provisional	Named after	Date	Site	Discoverer(s)	Category	Diam.	Ref
771601	2016 NT_{6}	—	January 22, 2015	Haleakala	Pan-STARRS 1	·	580 m	MPC · JPL
771602	2016 NV_{12}	—	January 29, 2014	Mount Lemmon	Mount Lemmon Survey	·	2.7 km	MPC · JPL
771603	2016 NN_{14}	—	January 26, 2014	Haleakala	Pan-STARRS 1	·	2.6 km	MPC · JPL
771604	2016 NP_{47}	—	July 4, 2016	Haleakala	Pan-STARRS 1	LIX	2.9 km	MPC · JPL
771605	2016 NG_{48}	—	December 16, 2007	Kitt Peak	Spacewatch	EOS	1.5 km	MPC · JPL
771606	2016 NC_{49}	—	November 28, 2013	Kitt Peak	Spacewatch	·	1.0 km	MPC · JPL
771607	2016 NU_{59}	—	May 1, 2011	Haleakala	Pan-STARRS 1	·	1.3 km	MPC · JPL
771608	2016 NJ_{62}	—	October 28, 2005	Kitt Peak	Spacewatch	·	920 m	MPC · JPL
771609	2016 NU_{66}	—	December 13, 2006	Mount Lemmon	Mount Lemmon Survey	·	820 m	MPC · JPL
771610	2016 NC_{70}	—	February 8, 2008	Mount Lemmon	Mount Lemmon Survey	·	2.3 km	MPC · JPL
771611	2016 NZ_{72}	—	October 26, 2013	Mount Lemmon	Mount Lemmon Survey	·	820 m	MPC · JPL
771612	2016 NF_{73}	—	July 14, 2016	Haleakala	Pan-STARRS 1	KOR	1.0 km	MPC · JPL
771613	2016 NJ_{73}	—	October 14, 2009	Mount Lemmon	Mount Lemmon Survey	·	880 m	MPC · JPL
771614	2016 NP_{73}	—	September 15, 2006	Kitt Peak	Spacewatch	·	1.2 km	MPC · JPL
771615	2016 NB_{76}	—	February 27, 2004	Kitt Peak	Deep Ecliptic Survey	·	1.8 km	MPC · JPL
771616	2016 NE_{81}	—	July 7, 2016	Haleakala	Pan-STARRS 1	·	2.4 km	MPC · JPL
771617	2016 NV_{86}	—	July 12, 2016	Haleakala	Pan-STARRS 1	VER	2.2 km	MPC · JPL
771618	2016 NR_{88}	—	January 11, 2008	Kitt Peak	Spacewatch	·	560 m	MPC · JPL
771619	2016 NL_{89}	—	January 24, 2014	Haleakala	Pan-STARRS 1	TIR	2.5 km	MPC · JPL
771620	2016 NA_{92}	—	July 10, 2016	Mount Lemmon	Mount Lemmon Survey	·	950 m	MPC · JPL
771621	2016 NE_{92}	—	November 25, 2005	Catalina	CSS	MAS	580 m	MPC · JPL
771622	2016 NK_{92}	—	July 4, 2016	Kitt Peak	Spacewatch	PHO	730 m	MPC · JPL
771623	2016 NP_{94}	—	July 4, 2016	Haleakala	Pan-STARRS 1	·	920 m	MPC · JPL
771624	2016 NV_{103}	—	July 5, 2016	Mount Lemmon	Mount Lemmon Survey	·	2.6 km	MPC · JPL
771625	2016 NU_{109}	—	July 14, 2016	Haleakala	Pan-STARRS 1	·	810 m	MPC · JPL
771626	2016 NE_{111}	—	July 5, 2016	Haleakala	Pan-STARRS 1	·	1.6 km	MPC · JPL
771627	2016 NV_{113}	—	July 7, 2016	Mount Lemmon	Mount Lemmon Survey	·	1.9 km	MPC · JPL
771628	2016 NG_{115}	—	July 13, 2016	Mount Lemmon	Mount Lemmon Survey	·	2.8 km	MPC · JPL
771629	2016 NS_{119}	—	July 8, 2016	Haleakala	Pan-STARRS 1	·	2.5 km	MPC · JPL
771630	2016 NU_{120}	—	July 12, 2016	Haleakala	Pan-STARRS 1	·	830 m	MPC · JPL
771631	2016 NJ_{121}	—	July 14, 2016	Haleakala	Pan-STARRS 1	·	660 m	MPC · JPL
771632	2016 NK_{123}	—	July 13, 2016	Haleakala	Pan-STARRS 1	·	2.2 km	MPC · JPL
771633	2016 NP_{123}	—	July 5, 2016	Haleakala	Pan-STARRS 1	·	2.5 km	MPC · JPL
771634	2016 NB_{125}	—	July 7, 2016	Haleakala	Pan-STARRS 1	·	910 m	MPC · JPL
771635	2016 NW_{129}	—	July 11, 2016	Haleakala	Pan-STARRS 1	V	480 m	MPC · JPL
771636	2016 NH_{142}	—	July 5, 2016	Mount Lemmon	Mount Lemmon Survey	·	2.9 km	MPC · JPL
771637	2016 NH_{143}	—	July 14, 2016	Haleakala	Pan-STARRS 1	·	2.4 km	MPC · JPL
771638	2016 NN_{145}	—	July 14, 2016	Haleakala	Pan-STARRS 1	·	1.8 km	MPC · JPL
771639	2016 NL_{147}	—	July 4, 2016	Haleakala	Pan-STARRS 1	·	2.5 km	MPC · JPL
771640	2016 NH_{152}	—	July 14, 2016	Haleakala	Pan-STARRS 1	·	1.3 km	MPC · JPL
771641	2016 NZ_{168}	—	July 9, 2016	Haleakala	Pan-STARRS 1	·	2.6 km	MPC · JPL
771642	2016 NQ_{172}	—	July 11, 2016	Haleakala	Pan-STARRS 1	·	2.3 km	MPC · JPL
771643	2016 NC_{173}	—	July 12, 2016	Haleakala	Pan-STARRS 1	·	2.3 km	MPC · JPL
771644	2016 NQ_{182}	—	January 22, 2015	Haleakala	Pan-STARRS 1	·	800 m	MPC · JPL
771645	2016 OU_{1}	—	November 1, 2005	Mount Lemmon	Mount Lemmon Survey	NYS	730 m	MPC · JPL
771646	2016 OK_{4}	—	April 14, 2015	Mount Lemmon	Mount Lemmon Survey	·	900 m	MPC · JPL
771647	2016 OV_{13}	—	July 30, 2016	Haleakala	Pan-STARRS 1	H	390 m	MPC · JPL
771648	2016 PX_{5}	—	September 17, 1998	Kitt Peak	Spacewatch	·	800 m	MPC · JPL
771649	2016 PX_{19}	—	August 16, 2012	Haleakala	Pan-STARRS 1	MAR	950 m	MPC · JPL
771650	2016 PZ_{19}	—	January 22, 2015	Haleakala	Pan-STARRS 1	V	440 m	MPC · JPL
771651	2016 PH_{22}	—	August 1, 2016	Haleakala	Pan-STARRS 1	V	440 m	MPC · JPL
771652	2016 PC_{28}	—	February 16, 2015	Haleakala	Pan-STARRS 1	·	2.5 km	MPC · JPL
771653	2016 PR_{32}	—	August 6, 2016	Haleakala	Pan-STARRS 1	·	2.7 km	MPC · JPL
771654	2016 PV_{33}	—	March 16, 2009	Kitt Peak	Spacewatch	·	2.8 km	MPC · JPL
771655	2016 PD_{38}	—	July 13, 2016	Mount Lemmon	Mount Lemmon Survey	H	310 m	MPC · JPL
771656	2016 PH_{40}	—	April 1, 2013	Haleakala	Pan-STARRS 1	H	400 m	MPC · JPL
771657	2016 PT_{42}	—	August 29, 2009	Kitt Peak	Spacewatch	V	410 m	MPC · JPL
771658	2016 PJ_{43}	—	April 20, 2015	Haleakala	Pan-STARRS 1	·	2.2 km	MPC · JPL
771659	2016 PG_{44}	—	March 1, 2009	Kitt Peak	Spacewatch	·	2.0 km	MPC · JPL
771660	2016 PP_{46}	—	October 8, 2008	Mount Lemmon	Mount Lemmon Survey	·	1.2 km	MPC · JPL
771661	2016 PG_{48}	—	October 9, 2013	Mount Lemmon	Mount Lemmon Survey	·	970 m	MPC · JPL
771662	2016 PP_{52}	—	April 27, 2012	Haleakala	Pan-STARRS 1	V	440 m	MPC · JPL
771663	2016 PV_{52}	—	February 10, 2014	Mount Lemmon	Mount Lemmon Survey	·	2.2 km	MPC · JPL
771664	2016 PU_{53}	—	October 12, 2010	Kitt Peak	Spacewatch	SYL	2.9 km	MPC · JPL
771665	2016 PN_{54}	—	March 11, 2014	Mount Lemmon	Mount Lemmon Survey	·	2.4 km	MPC · JPL
771666	2016 PW_{60}	—	September 24, 2012	Kitt Peak	Spacewatch	HNS	950 m	MPC · JPL
771667	2016 PQ_{61}	—	October 23, 2013	Mount Lemmon	Mount Lemmon Survey	·	680 m	MPC · JPL
771668	2016 PQ_{62}	—	October 18, 2009	Kitt Peak	Spacewatch	·	940 m	MPC · JPL
771669	2016 PP_{63}	—	April 27, 2012	Haleakala	Pan-STARRS 1	·	500 m	MPC · JPL
771670	2016 PO_{69}	—	November 27, 2013	Haleakala	Pan-STARRS 1	·	950 m	MPC · JPL
771671	2016 PZ_{74}	—	February 5, 2011	Haleakala	Pan-STARRS 1	·	560 m	MPC · JPL
771672	2016 PS_{82}	—	September 16, 2009	Kitt Peak	Spacewatch	V	500 m	MPC · JPL
771673	2016 PM_{85}	—	August 3, 2016	Haleakala	Pan-STARRS 1	V	510 m	MPC · JPL
771674	2016 PQ_{91}	—	December 14, 2013	Mount Lemmon	Mount Lemmon Survey	V	450 m	MPC · JPL
771675	2016 PA_{92}	—	September 25, 2011	Haleakala	Pan-STARRS 1	·	2.1 km	MPC · JPL
771676	2016 PV_{93}	—	August 3, 2016	Haleakala	Pan-STARRS 1	·	1.2 km	MPC · JPL
771677	2016 PK_{94}	—	August 10, 2016	Haleakala	Pan-STARRS 1	·	1.2 km	MPC · JPL
771678	2016 PF_{99}	—	September 19, 2009	Mount Lemmon	Mount Lemmon Survey	·	760 m	MPC · JPL
771679	2016 PP_{100}	—	May 20, 2015	Haleakala	Pan-STARRS 1	EOS	1.4 km	MPC · JPL
771680	2016 PP_{103}	—	February 16, 2010	Kitt Peak	Spacewatch	·	1.9 km	MPC · JPL
771681	2016 PB_{104}	—	January 23, 2011	Mount Lemmon	Mount Lemmon Survey	·	490 m	MPC · JPL
771682	2016 PH_{106}	—	November 4, 2004	Kitt Peak	Spacewatch	EUN	820 m	MPC · JPL
771683	2016 PL_{111}	—	August 2, 2016	Haleakala	Pan-STARRS 1	PHO	630 m	MPC · JPL
771684	2016 PW_{112}	—	August 2, 2016	Haleakala	Pan-STARRS 1	·	1.4 km	MPC · JPL
771685	2016 PU_{118}	—	September 19, 1998	Apache Point	SDSS	·	740 m	MPC · JPL
771686	2016 PE_{119}	—	July 11, 2016	Haleakala	Pan-STARRS 1	PHO	670 m	MPC · JPL
771687	2016 PP_{119}	—	October 26, 2013	Kitt Peak	Spacewatch	V	510 m	MPC · JPL
771688	2016 PX_{119}	—	October 22, 2011	Mount Lemmon	Mount Lemmon Survey	·	2.2 km	MPC · JPL
771689	2016 PN_{122}	—	February 1, 2011	Kitt Peak	Spacewatch	·	850 m	MPC · JPL
771690	2016 PG_{124}	—	February 19, 2014	Mount Lemmon	Mount Lemmon Survey	·	980 m	MPC · JPL
771691	2016 PF_{128}	—	October 9, 2007	Kitt Peak	Spacewatch	KOR	1.1 km	MPC · JPL
771692	2016 PC_{131}	—	August 3, 2016	Haleakala	Pan-STARRS 1	·	2.7 km	MPC · JPL
771693	2016 PF_{141}	—	August 29, 2016	Mount Lemmon	Mount Lemmon Survey	·	750 m	MPC · JPL
771694	2016 PU_{147}	—	October 25, 2009	Kitt Peak	Spacewatch	·	910 m	MPC · JPL
771695	2016 PM_{148}	—	August 8, 2016	Haleakala	Pan-STARRS 1	·	840 m	MPC · JPL
771696	2016 PT_{150}	—	August 14, 2016	Haleakala	Pan-STARRS 1	·	2.8 km	MPC · JPL
771697	2016 PL_{151}	—	August 1, 2016	Haleakala	Pan-STARRS 1	·	2.8 km	MPC · JPL
771698	2016 PM_{153}	—	August 10, 2016	Haleakala	Pan-STARRS 1	·	1.8 km	MPC · JPL
771699	2016 PS_{153}	—	August 2, 2016	Haleakala	Pan-STARRS 1	EOS	1.5 km	MPC · JPL
771700	2016 PN_{154}	—	August 1, 2016	Haleakala	Pan-STARRS 1	·	1.9 km	MPC · JPL

== 771701–771800 ==
back to top

Designation			Discovery			Properties		Ref
Permanent	Provisional	Named after	Date	Site	Discoverer(s)	Category	Diam.	Ref
771701	2016 PG_{155}	—	August 10, 2016	Haleakala	Pan-STARRS 1	T_{j} (2.92)	3.4 km	MPC · JPL
771702	2016 PN_{155}	—	August 2, 2016	Haleakala	Pan-STARRS 1	·	1.4 km	MPC · JPL
771703	2016 PG_{157}	—	August 2, 2016	Haleakala	Pan-STARRS 1	·	1.6 km	MPC · JPL
771704	2016 PQ_{158}	—	August 10, 2016	Haleakala	Pan-STARRS 1	·	2.3 km	MPC · JPL
771705	2016 PM_{165}	—	August 3, 2016	Haleakala	Pan-STARRS 1	·	770 m	MPC · JPL
771706	2016 PV_{167}	—	August 8, 2016	Haleakala	Pan-STARRS 1	VER	2.2 km	MPC · JPL
771707	2016 PE_{174}	—	August 2, 2016	Haleakala	Pan-STARRS 1	TEL	1.1 km	MPC · JPL
771708	2016 PY_{175}	—	August 14, 2016	Haleakala	Pan-STARRS 1	·	880 m	MPC · JPL
771709	2016 PM_{177}	—	August 3, 2016	Haleakala	Pan-STARRS 1	·	830 m	MPC · JPL
771710	2016 PE_{180}	—	August 1, 2016	Haleakala	Pan-STARRS 1	·	2.4 km	MPC · JPL
771711	2016 PF_{183}	—	August 11, 2016	Haleakala	Pan-STARRS 1	V	450 m	MPC · JPL
771712	2016 PM_{184}	—	August 10, 2016	Haleakala	Pan-STARRS 1	·	1.4 km	MPC · JPL
771713	2016 PQ_{184}	—	August 2, 2016	Haleakala	Pan-STARRS 1	V	460 m	MPC · JPL
771714	2016 PO_{186}	—	August 14, 2016	Haleakala	Pan-STARRS 1	·	710 m	MPC · JPL
771715	2016 PM_{188}	—	August 8, 2016	Haleakala	Pan-STARRS 1	·	630 m	MPC · JPL
771716	2016 PH_{202}	—	September 16, 2017	Haleakala	Pan-STARRS 1	SYL	2.8 km	MPC · JPL
771717	2016 PT_{209}	—	August 8, 2016	Haleakala	Pan-STARRS 1	·	2.2 km	MPC · JPL
771718	2016 PD_{236}	—	August 3, 2016	Haleakala	Pan-STARRS 1	JUN	900 m	MPC · JPL
771719	2016 PJ_{239}	—	August 8, 2016	Haleakala	Pan-STARRS 1	KOR	980 m	MPC · JPL
771720	2016 PA_{243}	—	January 10, 2008	Mount Lemmon	Mount Lemmon Survey	·	2.1 km	MPC · JPL
771721	2016 PH_{252}	—	August 9, 2016	Haleakala	Pan-STARRS 1	·	1.6 km	MPC · JPL
771722	2016 PY_{257}	—	April 7, 2014	Mount Lemmon	Mount Lemmon Survey	·	2.3 km	MPC · JPL
771723	2016 PO_{259}	—	August 6, 2016	Haleakala	Pan-STARRS 1	T_{j} (2.98)	2.9 km	MPC · JPL
771724	2016 PF_{260}	—	August 3, 2016	Haleakala	Pan-STARRS 1	·	2.3 km	MPC · JPL
771725	2016 PY_{260}	—	August 10, 2016	Haleakala	Pan-STARRS 1	·	2.8 km	MPC · JPL
771726	2016 PS_{263}	—	August 9, 2016	Haleakala	Pan-STARRS 1	·	1.8 km	MPC · JPL
771727	2016 PO_{265}	—	August 3, 2016	Haleakala	Pan-STARRS 1	·	1.5 km	MPC · JPL
771728	2016 PD_{274}	—	November 9, 2013	Mount Lemmon	Mount Lemmon Survey	·	630 m	MPC · JPL
771729	2016 QM_{4}	—	February 10, 2008	Mount Lemmon	Mount Lemmon Survey	NYS	870 m	MPC · JPL
771730	2016 QK_{5}	—	January 22, 2015	Haleakala	Pan-STARRS 1	·	580 m	MPC · JPL
771731	2016 QT_{5}	—	July 12, 2005	Mount Lemmon	Mount Lemmon Survey	NYS	890 m	MPC · JPL
771732	2016 QA_{22}	—	January 25, 2014	Haleakala	Pan-STARRS 1	LIX	2.7 km	MPC · JPL
771733	2016 QM_{42}	—	January 29, 2014	Kitt Peak	Spacewatch	HNS	1.1 km	MPC · JPL
771734	2016 QL_{43}	—	October 8, 2012	Mount Lemmon	Mount Lemmon Survey	·	1.1 km	MPC · JPL
771735	2016 QQ_{50}	—	January 12, 2011	Mount Lemmon	Mount Lemmon Survey	CLA	1.2 km	MPC · JPL
771736	2016 QY_{51}	—	February 12, 2008	Mount Lemmon	Mount Lemmon Survey	V	490 m	MPC · JPL
771737	2016 QV_{72}	—	October 13, 2001	Socorro	LINEAR	·	860 m	MPC · JPL
771738	2016 QL_{73}	—	August 29, 2016	Mount Lemmon	Mount Lemmon Survey	·	950 m	MPC · JPL
771739 Joseph	2016 QS_{82}	Joseph	August 31, 2016	Big Water	D. Rankin	V	430 m	MPC · JPL
771740	2016 QV_{89}	—	August 25, 2016	Cerro Tololo	Dark Energy Survey	SDO	243 km	MPC · JPL
771741	2016 QN_{94}	—	June 10, 2015	Haleakala	Pan-STARRS 1	·	1.8 km	MPC · JPL
771742	2016 QH_{96}	—	August 24, 2016	XuYi	PMO NEO Survey Program	·	860 m	MPC · JPL
771743	2016 QB_{105}	—	August 28, 2016	Mount Lemmon	Mount Lemmon Survey	THM	2.0 km	MPC · JPL
771744	2016 QP_{107}	—	August 29, 2016	Mount Lemmon	Mount Lemmon Survey	·	1.9 km	MPC · JPL
771745	2016 QF_{111}	—	August 30, 2016	Haleakala	Pan-STARRS 1	·	1.3 km	MPC · JPL
771746	2016 QN_{111}	—	August 28, 2016	Mount Lemmon	Mount Lemmon Survey	·	900 m	MPC · JPL
771747	2016 QX_{113}	—	August 30, 2016	Mount Lemmon	Mount Lemmon Survey	·	920 m	MPC · JPL
771748	2016 QG_{114}	—	August 30, 2016	Haleakala	Pan-STARRS 1	·	1.0 km	MPC · JPL
771749	2016 QX_{116}	—	August 30, 2016	Haleakala	Pan-STARRS 1	·	1.5 km	MPC · JPL
771750	2016 QB_{119}	—	August 29, 2016	Mount Lemmon	Mount Lemmon Survey	·	810 m	MPC · JPL
771751	2016 QK_{119}	—	August 26, 2016	Haleakala	Pan-STARRS 1	·	2.6 km	MPC · JPL
771752	2016 QS_{120}	—	August 27, 2016	Haleakala	Pan-STARRS 1	V	500 m	MPC · JPL
771753	2016 QQ_{126}	—	August 27, 2016	Haleakala	Pan-STARRS 1	·	2.3 km	MPC · JPL
771754	2016 QR_{129}	—	August 30, 2016	Mount Lemmon	Mount Lemmon Survey	·	2.1 km	MPC · JPL
771755	2016 QD_{143}	—	August 26, 2016	Haleakala	Pan-STARRS 1	·	1.6 km	MPC · JPL
771756	2016 QF_{146}	—	August 26, 2016	Haleakala	Pan-STARRS 1	V	480 m	MPC · JPL
771757	2016 RK_{2}	—	January 11, 2008	Kitt Peak	Spacewatch	EUP	3.3 km	MPC · JPL
771758	2016 RX_{14}	—	March 28, 2015	Haleakala	Pan-STARRS 1	·	2.7 km	MPC · JPL
771759	2016 RS_{25}	—	January 1, 2014	Mount Lemmon	Mount Lemmon Survey	PHO	820 m	MPC · JPL
771760	2016 RW_{26}	—	September 8, 2016	Haleakala	Pan-STARRS 1	·	2.5 km	MPC · JPL
771761	2016 RM_{37}	—	September 30, 2005	Mount Lemmon	Mount Lemmon Survey	MAS	550 m	MPC · JPL
771762	2016 RB_{38}	—	February 26, 2014	Haleakala	Pan-STARRS 1	EUN	910 m	MPC · JPL
771763	2016 RO_{41}	—	October 27, 2005	Mount Lemmon	Mount Lemmon Survey	·	910 m	MPC · JPL
771764	2016 RL_{46}	—	October 22, 2012	Haleakala	Pan-STARRS 1	·	1.2 km	MPC · JPL
771765	2016 RV_{46}	—	November 16, 2001	Kitt Peak	Spacewatch	·	950 m	MPC · JPL
771766	2016 RL_{48}	—	September 8, 2016	Haleakala	Pan-STARRS 1	·	2.6 km	MPC · JPL
771767	2016 RG_{56}	—	September 12, 2016	Haleakala	Pan-STARRS 1	H	400 m	MPC · JPL
771768	2016 RE_{60}	—	September 5, 2016	Mount Lemmon	Mount Lemmon Survey	·	2.5 km	MPC · JPL
771769	2016 RR_{60}	—	September 11, 2016	Mount Lemmon	Mount Lemmon Survey	PHO	1.0 km	MPC · JPL
771770	2016 RX_{61}	—	September 10, 2016	Mount Lemmon	Mount Lemmon Survey	·	1.8 km	MPC · JPL
771771	2016 RQ_{63}	—	September 12, 2016	Mount Lemmon	Mount Lemmon Survey	·	1.4 km	MPC · JPL
771772	2016 RF_{65}	—	November 17, 2007	Kitt Peak	Spacewatch	·	1.2 km	MPC · JPL
771773	2016 RQ_{69}	—	September 6, 2016	Mount Lemmon	Mount Lemmon Survey	V	540 m	MPC · JPL
771774	2016 RE_{71}	—	September 10, 2016	Mount Lemmon	Mount Lemmon Survey	·	940 m	MPC · JPL
771775	2016 RC_{95}	—	September 12, 2016	Mount Lemmon	Mount Lemmon Survey	T_{j} (2.99) · 3:2	2.8 km	MPC · JPL
771776	2016 SU_{8}	—	December 17, 2009	Kitt Peak	Spacewatch	·	1.0 km	MPC · JPL
771777	2016 SW_{13}	—	July 12, 2005	Mount Lemmon	Mount Lemmon Survey	V	490 m	MPC · JPL
771778	2016 SA_{18}	—	September 12, 2016	Haleakala	Pan-STARRS 1	·	1.9 km	MPC · JPL
771779	2016 SJ_{22}	—	August 2, 2016	Haleakala	Pan-STARRS 1	·	920 m	MPC · JPL
771780	2016 SP_{23}	—	October 24, 2011	Haleakala	Pan-STARRS 1	·	1.5 km	MPC · JPL
771781	2016 SP_{24}	—	August 27, 2006	Kitt Peak	Spacewatch	·	540 m	MPC · JPL
771782	2016 SV_{26}	—	January 2, 2014	Kitt Peak	Spacewatch	·	1.0 km	MPC · JPL
771783	2016 SM_{31}	—	October 30, 2005	Catalina	CSS	·	1.1 km	MPC · JPL
771784	2016 SA_{34}	—	July 9, 2005	Kitt Peak	Spacewatch	·	790 m	MPC · JPL
771785	2016 SU_{38}	—	April 22, 2009	Mount Lemmon	Mount Lemmon Survey	·	1.8 km	MPC · JPL
771786	2016 SW_{46}	—	April 2, 2005	Kitt Peak	Spacewatch	H	420 m	MPC · JPL
771787	2016 SR_{64}	—	September 26, 2016	Mount Lemmon	Mount Lemmon Survey	·	2.2 km	MPC · JPL
771788	2016 SU_{72}	—	September 26, 2016	Haleakala	Pan-STARRS 1	·	790 m	MPC · JPL
771789	2016 SV_{73}	—	September 27, 2016	Haleakala	Pan-STARRS 1	·	960 m	MPC · JPL
771790	2016 SU_{75}	—	September 27, 2016	Haleakala	Pan-STARRS 1	H	350 m	MPC · JPL
771791	2016 SW_{81}	—	September 22, 2016	Cerro Paranal	Gaia Ground Based Optical Tracking	·	2.0 km	MPC · JPL
771792	2016 SV_{89}	—	September 26, 2016	Haleakala	Pan-STARRS 1	·	820 m	MPC · JPL
771793	2016 SW_{90}	—	September 26, 2016	Haleakala	Pan-STARRS 1	V	460 m	MPC · JPL
771794	2016 SX_{90}	—	September 27, 2016	Haleakala	Pan-STARRS 1	MAR	780 m	MPC · JPL
771795	2016 SE_{97}	—	September 30, 2016	Haleakala	Pan-STARRS 1	VER	2.0 km	MPC · JPL
771796	2016 SF_{98}	—	September 25, 2016	Mount Lemmon	Mount Lemmon Survey	PHO	580 m	MPC · JPL
771797	2016 SF_{106}	—	September 27, 2016	Haleakala	Pan-STARRS 1	·	2.2 km	MPC · JPL
771798	2016 SV_{116}	—	September 26, 2016	Mount Lemmon	Mount Lemmon Survey	SYL	3.2 km	MPC · JPL
771799	2016 ST_{120}	—	September 25, 2016	Mount Lemmon	Mount Lemmon Survey	ELF	2.4 km	MPC · JPL
771800	2016 TU_{38}	—	August 13, 2012	Haleakala	Pan-STARRS 1	V	440 m	MPC · JPL

== 771801–771900 ==
back to top

Designation			Discovery			Properties		Ref
Permanent	Provisional	Named after	Date	Site	Discoverer(s)	Category	Diam.	Ref
771801	2016 TD_{41}	—	October 7, 2005	Mount Lemmon	Mount Lemmon Survey	·	2.3 km	MPC · JPL
771802	2016 TO_{54}	—	September 21, 2012	Mount Lemmon	Mount Lemmon Survey	·	1.1 km	MPC · JPL
771803	2016 TU_{54}	—	April 13, 2015	Haleakala	Pan-STARRS 1	H	290 m	MPC · JPL
771804	2016 TV_{56}	—	May 18, 2012	Mount Lemmon	Mount Lemmon Survey	·	680 m	MPC · JPL
771805	2016 TO_{74}	—	August 2, 2003	Haleakala	NEAT	·	830 m	MPC · JPL
771806	2016 TH_{78}	—	September 30, 1997	Kitt Peak	Spacewatch	NYS	910 m	MPC · JPL
771807	2016 TN_{82}	—	October 10, 2016	Mount Lemmon	Mount Lemmon Survey	·	1.8 km	MPC · JPL
771808	2016 TD_{98}	—	December 30, 2013	Mount Lemmon	Mount Lemmon Survey	·	980 m	MPC · JPL
771809	2016 TS_{98}	—	December 23, 2012	Haleakala	Pan-STARRS 1	·	1.6 km	MPC · JPL
771810	2016 TA_{101}	—	October 5, 2016	Mount Lemmon	Mount Lemmon Survey	T_{j} (2.98) · 3:2	3.8 km	MPC · JPL
771811	2016 TS_{120}	—	October 18, 2011	Mount Lemmon	Mount Lemmon Survey	HOF	2.0 km	MPC · JPL
771812	2016 TB_{123}	—	October 7, 2016	Haleakala	Pan-STARRS 1	·	1.9 km	MPC · JPL
771813	2016 TB_{126}	—	October 12, 2016	Haleakala	Pan-STARRS 1	·	1.2 km	MPC · JPL
771814	2016 TH_{129}	—	October 12, 2016	Haleakala	Pan-STARRS 1	·	1.6 km	MPC · JPL
771815	2016 TA_{135}	—	October 7, 2016	Haleakala	Pan-STARRS 1	·	1.1 km	MPC · JPL
771816	2016 TC_{141}	—	October 1, 2016	Mount Lemmon	Mount Lemmon Survey	·	900 m	MPC · JPL
771817	2016 TO_{145}	—	October 9, 2016	Mount Lemmon	Mount Lemmon Survey	·	790 m	MPC · JPL
771818	2016 TL_{148}	—	October 7, 2016	Haleakala	Pan-STARRS 1	·	990 m	MPC · JPL
771819	2016 TL_{151}	—	October 12, 2016	Haleakala	Pan-STARRS 1	·	830 m	MPC · JPL
771820	2016 TQ_{152}	—	October 10, 2016	Mount Lemmon	Mount Lemmon Survey	·	880 m	MPC · JPL
771821	2016 TX_{168}	—	October 10, 2016	Haleakala	Pan-STARRS 1	·	2.9 km	MPC · JPL
771822	2016 TG_{169}	—	October 6, 2016	Haleakala	Pan-STARRS 1	VER	1.9 km	MPC · JPL
771823	2016 TN_{170}	—	October 11, 2016	Mount Lemmon	Mount Lemmon Survey	·	2.1 km	MPC · JPL
771824	2016 TH_{171}	—	October 13, 2016	Mount Lemmon	Mount Lemmon Survey	·	2.3 km	MPC · JPL
771825	2016 TX_{177}	—	May 8, 2014	Haleakala	Pan-STARRS 1	·	2.2 km	MPC · JPL
771826	2016 TX_{181}	—	October 6, 2016	Haleakala	Pan-STARRS 1	VER	2.0 km	MPC · JPL
771827	2016 TP_{197}	—	October 12, 2016	Haleakala	Pan-STARRS 1	·	1.1 km	MPC · JPL
771828	2016 UH_{5}	—	December 24, 2014	Mount Lemmon	Mount Lemmon Survey	H	420 m	MPC · JPL
771829	2016 UK_{11}	—	August 10, 2016	Haleakala	Pan-STARRS 1	·	2.3 km	MPC · JPL
771830	2016 UZ_{12}	—	August 14, 2012	Haleakala	Pan-STARRS 1	MAS	590 m	MPC · JPL
771831	2016 UX_{49}	—	November 18, 2007	Mount Lemmon	Mount Lemmon Survey	HOF	2.0 km	MPC · JPL
771832	2016 UO_{54}	—	April 23, 2014	Cerro Tololo-DECam	DECam	·	2.3 km	MPC · JPL
771833	2016 UK_{73}	—	October 18, 1995	Kitt Peak	Spacewatch	EOS	1.4 km	MPC · JPL
771834	2016 UC_{89}	—	September 2, 2011	Haleakala	Pan-STARRS 1	·	1.4 km	MPC · JPL
771835	2016 UJ_{108}	—	September 17, 2003	Kitt Peak	Spacewatch	·	930 m	MPC · JPL
771836	2016 UF_{116}	—	January 16, 2013	Mount Lemmon	Mount Lemmon Survey	·	1.4 km	MPC · JPL
771837	2016 UE_{124}	—	May 3, 2014	Mount Lemmon	Mount Lemmon Survey	EOS	1.7 km	MPC · JPL
771838	2016 UG_{141}	—	October 9, 2016	Haleakala	Pan-STARRS 1	·	1.4 km	MPC · JPL
771839	2016 UV_{146}	—	July 29, 2009	Kitt Peak	Spacewatch	·	600 m	MPC · JPL
771840	2016 US_{150}	—	October 25, 2016	Haleakala	Pan-STARRS 1	·	1.1 km	MPC · JPL
771841	2016 UK_{151}	—	October 23, 2016	Mount Lemmon	Mount Lemmon Survey	·	1.6 km	MPC · JPL
771842	2016 UU_{155}	—	October 25, 2016	Haleakala	Pan-STARRS 1	H	290 m	MPC · JPL
771843	2016 UU_{218}	—	June 26, 2015	Haleakala	Pan-STARRS 1	KOR	840 m	MPC · JPL
771844	2016 US_{247}	—	October 26, 2016	Kitt Peak	Spacewatch	3:2	4.3 km	MPC · JPL
771845	2016 UG_{251}	—	October 31, 2016	Mount Lemmon	Mount Lemmon Survey	·	1.5 km	MPC · JPL
771846	2016 UX_{260}	—	February 28, 2014	Haleakala	Pan-STARRS 1	·	880 m	MPC · JPL
771847	2016 UF_{262}	—	October 21, 2016	Mount Lemmon	Mount Lemmon Survey	·	940 m	MPC · JPL
771848	2016 UN_{265}	—	October 21, 2016	Mount Lemmon	Mount Lemmon Survey	·	930 m	MPC · JPL
771849	2016 UA_{266}	—	October 28, 2016	Haleakala	Pan-STARRS 1	·	820 m	MPC · JPL
771850	2016 UA_{267}	—	September 26, 2011	Haleakala	Pan-STARRS 1	·	1.3 km	MPC · JPL
771851	2016 UY_{267}	—	October 25, 2016	Haleakala	Pan-STARRS 1	·	940 m	MPC · JPL
771852	2016 UN_{269}	—	October 26, 2016	Mount Lemmon	Mount Lemmon Survey	VER	1.9 km	MPC · JPL
771853	2016 UF_{272}	—	October 25, 2016	Haleakala	Pan-STARRS 1	VER	2.1 km	MPC · JPL
771854	2016 UJ_{280}	—	October 10, 2016	Mount Lemmon	Mount Lemmon Survey	·	2.1 km	MPC · JPL
771855	2016 UF_{282}	—	October 28, 2016	Haleakala	Pan-STARRS 1	·	1.2 km	MPC · JPL
771856	2016 UW_{282}	—	October 29, 2016	Mount Lemmon	Mount Lemmon Survey	RAF	730 m	MPC · JPL
771857	2016 VP_{14}	—	November 8, 2016	Mount Lemmon	Mount Lemmon Survey	(5)	780 m	MPC · JPL
771858	2016 VP_{16}	—	October 29, 2016	Mount Lemmon	Mount Lemmon Survey	·	1.7 km	MPC · JPL
771859	2016 VK_{20}	—	March 6, 2013	Haleakala	Pan-STARRS 1	·	1.8 km	MPC · JPL
771860	2016 VF_{22}	—	November 10, 2016	Haleakala	Pan-STARRS 1	H	510 m	MPC · JPL
771861	2016 VF_{25}	—	October 8, 2007	Catalina	CSS	ADE	1.6 km	MPC · JPL
771862	2016 VS_{28}	—	November 6, 2016	Haleakala	Pan-STARRS 1	L5	6.8 km	MPC · JPL
771863	2016 VR_{32}	—	November 8, 2016	Haleakala	Pan-STARRS 1	JUN	860 m	MPC · JPL
771864	2016 VX_{37}	—	November 3, 2016	Haleakala	Pan-STARRS 1	·	990 m	MPC · JPL
771865	2016 VA_{42}	—	November 5, 2016	Haleakala	Pan-STARRS 1	·	1.2 km	MPC · JPL
771866	2016 VD_{43}	—	November 10, 2016	Mount Lemmon	Mount Lemmon Survey	·	970 m	MPC · JPL
771867	2016 VP_{43}	—	November 10, 2016	Haleakala	Pan-STARRS 1	·	930 m	MPC · JPL
771868	2016 VQ_{43}	—	November 10, 2016	Haleakala	Pan-STARRS 1	BRG	1.2 km	MPC · JPL
771869	2016 VM_{47}	—	November 4, 2016	Haleakala	Pan-STARRS 1	EOS	1.3 km	MPC · JPL
771870	2016 VC_{49}	—	November 11, 2016	Mount Lemmon	Mount Lemmon Survey	·	1.3 km	MPC · JPL
771871	2016 WN_{16}	—	October 2, 1999	Kitt Peak	Spacewatch	·	670 m	MPC · JPL
771872	2016 WF_{18}	—	November 25, 2005	Mount Lemmon	Mount Lemmon Survey	V	540 m	MPC · JPL
771873	2016 WY_{21}	—	December 11, 2013	Haleakala	Pan-STARRS 1	·	560 m	MPC · JPL
771874	2016 WX_{27}	—	September 22, 2008	Mount Lemmon	Mount Lemmon Survey	T_{j} (2.96) · 3:2	3.2 km	MPC · JPL
771875	2016 WD_{29}	—	July 18, 2001	Kitt Peak	Spacewatch	·	810 m	MPC · JPL
771876	2016 WU_{32}	—	September 23, 2011	Haleakala	Pan-STARRS 1	·	1.5 km	MPC · JPL
771877	2016 WK_{40}	—	November 10, 2010	Mount Lemmon	Mount Lemmon Survey	·	2.4 km	MPC · JPL
771878	2016 WB_{47}	—	January 27, 2006	Kitt Peak	Spacewatch	·	1.0 km	MPC · JPL
771879	2016 WA_{48}	—	October 31, 2006	Mount Lemmon	Mount Lemmon Survey	TRE	1.8 km	MPC · JPL
771880	2016 WA_{50}	—	March 16, 2015	Haleakala	Pan-STARRS 1	H	430 m	MPC · JPL
771881	2016 WZ_{55}	—	October 12, 2009	Mount Lemmon	Mount Lemmon Survey	(2076)	750 m	MPC · JPL
771882	2016 WD_{60}	—	November 20, 2016	Mount Lemmon	Mount Lemmon Survey	H	370 m	MPC · JPL
771883	2016 WT_{61}	—	November 27, 2016	Haleakala	Pan-STARRS 1	H	470 m	MPC · JPL
771884	2016 WV_{66}	—	November 26, 2016	Mount Lemmon	Mount Lemmon Survey	·	1.2 km	MPC · JPL
771885	2016 WA_{69}	—	November 20, 2016	Mount Lemmon	Mount Lemmon Survey	·	990 m	MPC · JPL
771886	2016 WA_{70}	—	November 23, 2016	Mount Lemmon	Mount Lemmon Survey	·	990 m	MPC · JPL
771887	2016 WJ_{70}	—	November 28, 2016	Haleakala	Pan-STARRS 1	·	1.2 km	MPC · JPL
771888	2016 WZ_{71}	—	November 23, 2016	Mount Lemmon	Mount Lemmon Survey	·	1.1 km	MPC · JPL
771889	2016 XT_{3}	—	November 11, 2016	Mount Lemmon	Mount Lemmon Survey	MAR	1.0 km	MPC · JPL
771890	2016 XB_{8}	—	July 24, 2015	Haleakala	Pan-STARRS 1	·	2.4 km	MPC · JPL
771891	2016 XN_{19}	—	May 18, 2015	Haleakala	Pan-STARRS 1	H	410 m	MPC · JPL
771892	2016 XA_{23}	—	December 22, 2008	Kitt Peak	Spacewatch	·	750 m	MPC · JPL
771893	2016 XO_{23}	—	December 8, 2016	Mount Lemmon	Mount Lemmon Survey	APO · PHA	240 m	MPC · JPL
771894	2016 XS_{24}	—	August 23, 2011	Haleakala	Pan-STARRS 1	AEO	760 m	MPC · JPL
771895	2016 XB_{26}	—	December 9, 2016	Mount Lemmon	Mount Lemmon Survey	H	380 m	MPC · JPL
771896	2016 XZ_{26}	—	December 5, 2016	Mount Lemmon	Mount Lemmon Survey	·	630 m	MPC · JPL
771897	2016 XR_{29}	—	December 5, 2016	Mount Lemmon	Mount Lemmon Survey	·	1.0 km	MPC · JPL
771898	2016 XF_{31}	—	December 4, 2016	Mount Lemmon	Mount Lemmon Survey	HNS	920 m	MPC · JPL
771899	2016 XV_{31}	—	December 5, 2016	Mount Lemmon	Mount Lemmon Survey	·	760 m	MPC · JPL
771900	2016 XZ_{31}	—	December 4, 2016	Mount Lemmon	Mount Lemmon Survey	·	990 m	MPC · JPL

== 771901–772000 ==
back to top

Designation			Discovery			Properties		Ref
Permanent	Provisional	Named after	Date	Site	Discoverer(s)	Category	Diam.	Ref
771901	2016 XV_{34}	—	December 4, 2016	Kitt Peak	Spacewatch	·	3.2 km	MPC · JPL
771902	2016 XM_{38}	—	December 5, 2016	Mount Lemmon	Mount Lemmon Survey	·	1.1 km	MPC · JPL
771903	2016 YW_{1}	—	May 28, 2014	Haleakala	Pan-STARRS 1	(5)	940 m	MPC · JPL
771904	2016 YA_{4}	—	June 6, 2010	Kitt Peak	Spacewatch	H	450 m	MPC · JPL
771905	2016 YL_{12}	—	December 23, 2016	Haleakala	Pan-STARRS 1	HNS	790 m	MPC · JPL
771906	2016 YJ_{14}	—	October 12, 2015	Haleakala	Pan-STARRS 1	·	1.4 km	MPC · JPL
771907	2016 YR_{16}	—	December 24, 2016	Haleakala	Pan-STARRS 1	·	1.4 km	MPC · JPL
771908	2016 YX_{16}	—	December 23, 2016	Haleakala	Pan-STARRS 1	·	1.1 km	MPC · JPL
771909	2016 YA_{17}	—	November 25, 2016	Mount Lemmon	Mount Lemmon Survey	H	340 m	MPC · JPL
771910	2016 YM_{19}	—	January 12, 2016	Haleakala	Pan-STARRS 1	L5	6.1 km	MPC · JPL
771911	2016 YQ_{23}	—	December 22, 2016	Haleakala	Pan-STARRS 1	·	1.0 km	MPC · JPL
771912	2016 YU_{27}	—	December 25, 2016	Haleakala	Pan-STARRS 1	H	460 m	MPC · JPL
771913	2016 YO_{28}	—	December 22, 2016	Haleakala	Pan-STARRS 1	·	1.5 km	MPC · JPL
771914 Dawsoncharles	2016 YD_{36}	Dawsoncharles	December 29, 2016	Big Water	D. Rankin	·	920 m	MPC · JPL
771915	2017 AW_{1}	—	March 25, 2009	Mount Lemmon	Mount Lemmon Survey	·	1.2 km	MPC · JPL
771916	2017 AO_{7}	—	July 1, 2014	Haleakala	Pan-STARRS 1	·	2.2 km	MPC · JPL
771917	2017 AU_{7}	—	January 2, 2017	Haleakala	Pan-STARRS 1	·	1.5 km	MPC · JPL
771918	2017 AZ_{7}	—	January 2, 2017	Haleakala	Pan-STARRS 1	·	920 m	MPC · JPL
771919	2017 AS_{11}	—	September 12, 2005	Kitt Peak	Spacewatch	·	1.7 km	MPC · JPL
771920	2017 AO_{17}	—	November 26, 2012	Mount Lemmon	Mount Lemmon Survey	·	1.2 km	MPC · JPL
771921	2017 AK_{19}	—	January 10, 2017	Haleakala	Pan-STARRS 1	·	1.9 km	MPC · JPL
771922	2017 AX_{22}	—	September 1, 2014	Mount Lemmon	Mount Lemmon Survey	·	2.2 km	MPC · JPL
771923	2017 AY_{23}	—	February 13, 2013	Haleakala	Pan-STARRS 1	·	840 m	MPC · JPL
771924	2017 AA_{24}	—	May 6, 2014	Haleakala	Pan-STARRS 1	·	810 m	MPC · JPL
771925	2017 AL_{27}	—	January 4, 2017	Haleakala	Pan-STARRS 1	H	400 m	MPC · JPL
771926	2017 AF_{28}	—	March 24, 2013	Mount Lemmon	Mount Lemmon Survey	·	970 m	MPC · JPL
771927	2017 AT_{28}	—	January 4, 2017	Haleakala	Pan-STARRS 1	·	1.1 km	MPC · JPL
771928	2017 AZ_{29}	—	January 2, 2017	Haleakala	Pan-STARRS 1	·	1.5 km	MPC · JPL
771929	2017 AC_{30}	—	January 3, 2017	Haleakala	Pan-STARRS 1	HNS	730 m	MPC · JPL
771930	2017 AM_{30}	—	January 3, 2017	Haleakala	Pan-STARRS 1	MAR	670 m	MPC · JPL
771931	2017 AD_{31}	—	January 2, 2017	Haleakala	Pan-STARRS 1	H	410 m	MPC · JPL
771932	2017 AH_{31}	—	January 4, 2017	Haleakala	Pan-STARRS 1	·	900 m	MPC · JPL
771933	2017 AP_{31}	—	December 10, 2016	Kitt Peak	Spacewatch	H	430 m	MPC · JPL
771934	2017 AA_{33}	—	January 2, 2017	Haleakala	Pan-STARRS 1	·	1.4 km	MPC · JPL
771935	2017 AF_{34}	—	January 5, 2017	Mount Lemmon	Mount Lemmon Survey	·	1.6 km	MPC · JPL
771936	2017 AH_{34}	—	January 4, 2017	Haleakala	Pan-STARRS 1	·	970 m	MPC · JPL
771937	2017 AZ_{37}	—	January 9, 2017	Kitt Peak	Spacewatch	V	400 m	MPC · JPL
771938	2017 AS_{39}	—	January 8, 2017	Mount Lemmon	Mount Lemmon Survey	·	2.4 km	MPC · JPL
771939	2017 AH_{40}	—	January 9, 2017	Mount Lemmon	Mount Lemmon Survey	·	1.3 km	MPC · JPL
771940	2017 AQ_{40}	—	January 4, 2017	Haleakala	Pan-STARRS 1	·	1.4 km	MPC · JPL
771941	2017 AB_{45}	—	January 5, 2017	Mount Lemmon	Mount Lemmon Survey	·	1.1 km	MPC · JPL
771942	2017 AX_{52}	—	January 4, 2017	Haleakala	Pan-STARRS 1	EUN	830 m	MPC · JPL
771943	2017 BS_{1}	—	January 22, 2004	Socorro	LINEAR	HNS	1.2 km	MPC · JPL
771944	2017 BB_{10}	—	October 1, 2003	Kitt Peak	Spacewatch	(5)	850 m	MPC · JPL
771945	2017 BC_{12}	—	December 18, 2007	Mount Lemmon	Mount Lemmon Survey	ADE	1.4 km	MPC · JPL
771946	2017 BN_{14}	—	February 10, 2013	Nogales	M. Schwartz, P. R. Holvorcem	·	1.1 km	MPC · JPL
771947	2017 BR_{14}	—	February 14, 2009	Kitt Peak	Spacewatch	·	1.1 km	MPC · JPL
771948	2017 BZ_{14}	—	July 30, 2014	Haleakala	Pan-STARRS 1	EOS	1.7 km	MPC · JPL
771949	2017 BQ_{17}	—	February 14, 2002	Kitt Peak	Spacewatch	MAS	540 m	MPC · JPL
771950	2017 BF_{19}	—	October 5, 2015	Haleakala	Pan-STARRS 1	·	1.4 km	MPC · JPL
771951	2017 BS_{19}	—	September 19, 2001	Kitt Peak	Spacewatch	·	1.5 km	MPC · JPL
771952	2017 BO_{27}	—	February 8, 2008	Mount Lemmon	Mount Lemmon Survey	·	1.5 km	MPC · JPL
771953	2017 BU_{27}	—	October 21, 2006	Mount Lemmon	Mount Lemmon Survey	·	1.4 km	MPC · JPL
771954	2017 BR_{28}	—	November 27, 2011	Mount Lemmon	Mount Lemmon Survey	·	1.1 km	MPC · JPL
771955	2017 BV_{29}	—	January 26, 2017	Mount Lemmon	Mount Lemmon Survey	H	390 m	MPC · JPL
771956	2017 BC_{33}	—	January 9, 2013	Kitt Peak	Spacewatch	·	1.3 km	MPC · JPL
771957	2017 BF_{36}	—	September 10, 2007	Mount Lemmon	Mount Lemmon Survey	·	980 m	MPC · JPL
771958	2017 BG_{37}	—	March 12, 2013	Mount Lemmon	Mount Lemmon Survey	RAF	690 m	MPC · JPL
771959	2017 BY_{38}	—	October 1, 1999	Kitt Peak	Spacewatch	(5)	830 m	MPC · JPL
771960	2017 BT_{39}	—	January 9, 2017	Mount Lemmon	Mount Lemmon Survey	·	1.3 km	MPC · JPL
771961	2017 BE_{42}	—	November 1, 2007	Kitt Peak	Spacewatch	MIS	1.8 km	MPC · JPL
771962	2017 BJ_{46}	—	December 17, 2007	Mount Lemmon	Mount Lemmon Survey	·	1.4 km	MPC · JPL
771963	2017 BU_{49}	—	March 1, 2009	Kitt Peak	Spacewatch	·	1.1 km	MPC · JPL
771964	2017 BL_{51}	—	February 12, 2004	Kitt Peak	Spacewatch	·	1.5 km	MPC · JPL
771965	2017 BZ_{51}	—	November 17, 2007	Kitt Peak	Spacewatch	·	1.1 km	MPC · JPL
771966	2017 BY_{53}	—	December 23, 2016	Haleakala	Pan-STARRS 1	·	1.1 km	MPC · JPL
771967	2017 BT_{54}	—	May 16, 2009	Mount Lemmon	Mount Lemmon Survey	·	1.4 km	MPC · JPL
771968	2017 BG_{57}	—	November 20, 2003	Kitt Peak	Spacewatch	·	900 m	MPC · JPL
771969	2017 BV_{58}	—	February 15, 2013	Haleakala	Pan-STARRS 1	ADE	1.3 km	MPC · JPL
771970	2017 BQ_{59}	—	March 6, 2013	Haleakala	Pan-STARRS 1	·	990 m	MPC · JPL
771971	2017 BD_{60}	—	March 13, 2008	Mount Lemmon	Mount Lemmon Survey	·	1.3 km	MPC · JPL
771972	2017 BT_{61}	—	December 23, 2012	Haleakala	Pan-STARRS 1	·	860 m	MPC · JPL
771973	2017 BZ_{63}	—	December 4, 2016	Mount Lemmon	Mount Lemmon Survey	(194)	1.1 km	MPC · JPL
771974	2017 BS_{66}	—	October 10, 2015	Haleakala	Pan-STARRS 1	·	1.8 km	MPC · JPL
771975	2017 BU_{66}	—	November 3, 2015	Mount Lemmon	Mount Lemmon Survey	·	2.6 km	MPC · JPL
771976	2017 BU_{69}	—	February 5, 2013	Kitt Peak	Spacewatch	·	1.2 km	MPC · JPL
771977	2017 BL_{72}	—	September 23, 2011	Haleakala	Pan-STARRS 1	·	980 m	MPC · JPL
771978	2017 BD_{73}	—	October 26, 2011	Haleakala	Pan-STARRS 1	·	1.4 km	MPC · JPL
771979	2017 BB_{75}	—	October 26, 2011	Haleakala	Pan-STARRS 1	·	1.1 km	MPC · JPL
771980	2017 BX_{78}	—	February 26, 2008	Mount Lemmon	Mount Lemmon Survey	·	1.5 km	MPC · JPL
771981	2017 BZ_{78}	—	March 19, 2013	Haleakala	Pan-STARRS 1	·	1.4 km	MPC · JPL
771982	2017 BX_{82}	—	January 27, 2017	Haleakala	Pan-STARRS 1	HNS	880 m	MPC · JPL
771983	2017 BS_{85}	—	February 21, 2012	Kitt Peak	Spacewatch	·	2.0 km	MPC · JPL
771984	2017 BY_{85}	—	August 20, 2001	Cerro Tololo	Deep Ecliptic Survey	·	1.3 km	MPC · JPL
771985	2017 BF_{91}	—	November 8, 2016	Haleakala	Pan-STARRS 1	H	480 m	MPC · JPL
771986	2017 BL_{96}	—	March 8, 2013	Haleakala	Pan-STARRS 1	·	1.2 km	MPC · JPL
771987	2017 BM_{96}	—	September 8, 2015	Haleakala	Pan-STARRS 1	·	1.4 km	MPC · JPL
771988	2017 BR_{97}	—	January 7, 2017	Mount Lemmon	Mount Lemmon Survey	L5	7.7 km	MPC · JPL
771989	2017 BQ_{98}	—	July 14, 2015	Haleakala	Pan-STARRS 1	·	1.4 km	MPC · JPL
771990	2017 BW_{99}	—	November 18, 2007	Mount Lemmon	Mount Lemmon Survey	·	1.1 km	MPC · JPL
771991	2017 BY_{99}	—	April 10, 2013	Haleakala	Pan-STARRS 1	·	1.4 km	MPC · JPL
771992	2017 BW_{101}	—	November 18, 2015	Haleakala	Pan-STARRS 1	EOS	1.3 km	MPC · JPL
771993	2017 BK_{102}	—	April 12, 2013	Haleakala	Pan-STARRS 1	·	1.1 km	MPC · JPL
771994	2017 BW_{102}	—	November 12, 2015	Mount Lemmon	Mount Lemmon Survey	·	2.7 km	MPC · JPL
771995	2017 BE_{103}	—	October 30, 2007	Kitt Peak	Spacewatch	·	1.0 km	MPC · JPL
771996	2017 BV_{103}	—	November 30, 2003	Kitt Peak	Spacewatch	EUN	710 m	MPC · JPL
771997	2017 BD_{104}	—	October 26, 2011	Haleakala	Pan-STARRS 1	·	1.3 km	MPC · JPL
771998	2017 BJ_{107}	—	February 20, 2006	Kitt Peak	Spacewatch	THB	2.7 km	MPC · JPL
771999	2017 BJ_{109}	—	January 20, 2017	Haleakala	Pan-STARRS 1	H	500 m	MPC · JPL
772000	2017 BP_{113}	—	July 27, 2015	Haleakala	Pan-STARRS 1	·	960 m	MPC · JPL

== Meaning of names ==
As minor planet discoveries are confirmed, they are given a permanent number by the IAU's Minor Planet Center (MPC), and the discoverers can then submit names for them, following the IAU's naming conventions. The list below concerns those minor planets in the specified number-range that have received names, and explains the meanings of those names.

Official naming citations of newly named small Solar System bodies are approved and published in a bulletin by IAU's Working Group for Small Bodies Nomenclature (WGSBN). Before May 2021, citations were published in MPC's Minor Planet Circulars for many decades. Recent citations can also be found on the JPL Small-Body Database (SBDB). Until his death in 2016, German astronomer Lutz D. Schmadel compiled these citations into the Dictionary of Minor Planet Names (DMP) and regularly updated the collection.

Based on Paul Herget's The Names of the Minor Planets, Schmadel also researched the unclear origin of numerous asteroids, most of which had been named prior to World War II. This article incorporates text from this source, which is in the public domain: SBDB New namings may only be added to this list below after official publication as the preannouncement of names is condemned. The WGSBN publishes a comprehensive guideline for the naming rules of non-cometary small Solar System bodies.

Named minor planet	Provisional	This minor planet was named for...	Ref · Catalog
771739 Joseph	2016 QS_{82}	Joseph Alexander Rankin (b. 1990) is the brother of the discoverer. He works in information technology.	IAU · 771739
771914 Dawsoncharles	2016 YD_{36}	Dawson Charles Rankin (b. 2009) is the son of the discoverer.	IAU · 771914
