= Elizabeth Mooney Kirk =

- Born: February 23, 1914
- Died: June 29, 2004 (aged 90)
- Other name: Betty Kirk
- Education: George Washington University; Syracuse University
- Occupations: Author, humanitarian
- Relatives: Addison Clark (grandfather)

Elizabeth Mooney Kirk (February 23, 1914 – June 29, 2004), known by many as "Betty", spent her entire life advancing adult literacy. She worked with Frank Laubach using his "Each One Teach One" reading method. She traveled and taught in India, Africa and the United States. While working in Kenya, she provided the financial support for Barack Obama Sr. to come to the United States to study.

Kirk co-authored many books with Dr. Frank Laubach and son Dr. Robert Laubach, which are still in use for teaching adults to read English. In this role, her work included running a mission boarding school in India and for two years she was head of a project for the British Government in Kenya training teachers and adults to read in some of the tribal languages.

Kirk and her literacy associate Helen M. Roberts of Palo Alto often helped find sponsorships for promising Kenyan students to study in the United States. An article by Michael Dobbs in The Washington Post states that Kirk provided most of the financial support during Obama Sr's early years in the United States, according to the Tom Mboya archives at Stanford University. Kirk and Roberts are mentioned in Barack Obama's 1995 book, Dreams from My Father (pg 427 hardcover). Roberts encouraged and supported his many college applications and correspondences, while Kirk provided college recommendation letters.

Kirk and Roberts raised the money necessary for Barack to travel to America.

Kirk's grandfather was Addison Clark who, with his brother, founded the Addran Male and Female Academy which became Texas Christian University. She earned master's degrees from George Washington University and Syracuse University. In 1960, she married Elmer LeValley Kirk. They lived for a time in West Africa before moving to California. Kirk taught school in the Oakland area for many years before retiring to central California.

== Sources ==
- San Luis Obispo Tribune 7/8/2004, Elizabeth Mooney Kirk Obituary
- Washington Post 3/30/2008. "Obama Overstates Kennedy's Role in Helping His Father" Michael Dobbs.
