= David Moessner =

American theologian

David P. Moessner
- Born: United States
- Occupations: American biblical theologian, academic, and author

Academic background
- Education: A.B. M.Div. B.A. M.A. Dr. theol.
- Alma mater: Princeton University; Princeton Theological Seminary; University of Oxford; University of Basel

David P. Moessner is an American biblical theologian, academic, and author. He is the A. A. Bradford Chair as well as a Professor of Religion at Texas Christian University.

Moessner is most known for his research on Jewish Christianity, exploring the use of scripture in early Judaism and the New Testament, Hellenistic influences, and contemporary biblical theology. His authored works encompass publications in academic journals, including Journal of Biblical Literature as well as books such as Lord of the Banquet: The Literary and Theological Significance of the Lukan Travel Narrative and Luke the Historian of Israel's Legacy, Theologian of Israel's 'Christ': A New Reading of the 'Gospel Acts' of Luke. He is a longtime co-editor of the Supplements to Novum Testamentum.

== Education ==
Moessner earned his A.B. degree from Princeton University in 1971 and subsequently obtained a Master of Divinity from Princeton Theological Seminary in 1975. In 1976, he completed a Bachelor of Arts through the Honours School of Theology of the University of Oxford, followed by a Master of Arts from the same institution in 1980. Writing his dissertation under the supervision of Bo Reicke on the literary and theological significances of the many meal scenes and banquet parables in the two volume Luke and Acts, he achieved his Doctor of Theology from the University of Basel in 1983.

== Works ==
Moessner's body of research comprises journal articles, essays, and books. In 1989, he authored the monograph Lord of the Banquet: The Literary and Theological Significance of the Lukan Travel Narrative, wherein he explored the "travel" section of the Gospel of Luke, addressing narrative confusion by focusing on Jesus's eating and drinking. The book argued that these meal scenes illuminated the section's structure together with its theological significance not only within the broader context of Luke-Acts but especially through the many intertextual connections to the history of Israel. In 1999, he edited volume 1 of the series Luke the Interpreter of Israel. The book examined how scholars argued that Luke presented Jesus as the fulfillment of Israel's legacy, analyzing Luke's narrative techniques, use of Greco-Roman conventions, and the thematic coherence between the Gospel and Acts. Later in 2012, he edited its 2nd volume, evaluating the complex relationship between Paul, early Christianity, and Jewish heritage, centering on Paul's portrayal in Luke's writings as well as within Paul's own letters, while exploring Paul's considerable influence on early Christian identity and his connection to Jesus and Israel.

In 2016, Moessner authored the book Luke the Historian of Israel's Legacy, Theologian of Israel's 'Christ': A New Reading of the 'Gospel Acts' of Luke. In this work, he reinterpreted the Gospel of Luke and Acts as a unified narrative, challenging the view of Acts as disconnected, and explored Luke's use of narrative Greek rhetoric and Jewish traditions to present a cohesive theological message. Luke Timothy Johnson, the Robert W. Woodruff Professor of New Testament and Christian Origins at Emory University, reviewed the book, stating: "Professor Moessner has for many years made significant contributions to our understanding of Luke-Acts, contributions based in part on his deep learning in ancient literary theory, in part on his close exegesis of Luke's language, and in part on his firm grasp of the theological framework within which Luke works." Four years later in 2020, he co-edited a book titled Modern and Ancient Literary Criticism of the Gospels: Continuing the Debate on Gospel Genre(s) with R. M. Calhoun and T. Nicklas.

Moessner served as the book editor for the Gospel of Luke in the New Revised Standard Version, Updated Edition (2021), in which, he argued for a "sea change" in Luke's self-description in Luke 1:3 by changing "I too decided, after investigating everything carefully from the very first, to write...for you" — to — "I too decided, as one having a grasp of everything from the start, to write...for you". This modification reflected a shift in the interpretation of Luke's role within the Jesus traditions. Rather than portraying Luke as an outsider conducting historical research, the revised translation suggests that Luke had been a part of the Jesus movement for some time, possessing a foundational understanding before deciding to write. Later in 2023, he coedited another book titled Paul, Christian Textuality, and the Hermeneutics of Late Antiquity: Essays in Honor of Margaret M. Mitchell. The volume celebrated Professor Mitchell's scholarship by exploring Pauline letters, the development of early Christian literary culture, and Late Antique interpretive practices.

== Bibliography ==
=== Selected books ===
- Lord of the Banquet: The Literary and Theological Significance of the Lukan Travel Narrative (1989) ISBN 9780800608934
- Luke the Historian of Israel’s Legacy, Theologian of Israel’s ‘Christ’: A New Reading of the ‘Gospel Acts’ of Luke (2016) ISBN 9783110255393

=== Selected articles and book chapters ===
- Moessner, D. P. (1983). Luke 9:1-50: Luke's preview of the journey of the prophet like Moses of Deuteronomy. Journal of Biblical Literature, 102(4), 575–605.
- Moessner, D. P. (1986). "The Christ must suffer": New light on the Jesus-Peter, Stephen, Paul parallels in Luke-Acts. Novum Testamentum, 28(3), 220–256.
- Moessner, D. P. (1988). Paul in Acts: Preacher of eschatological repentance to Israel. New Testament Studies, 34(1), 96–104.
- Moessner, D. P. (1996). ‘Eyewitnesses,’ ‘informed contemporaries,’ and ‘unknowing inquirers’: Josephus' criteria for authentic historiography and the meaning of παρακολουθέω. In Festschrift for J. Smit Sibinga, Novum Testamentum, 38, 105–122.
- Moessner, D. P. (2004). Paul, the ‘gospel,’ and ‘narrative prompts’: ‘Just the same thing, forever.’ Horizons in Biblical Theology, 26, 94–114.
- Moessner, D. P. (2007). ‘How he was known in the breaking of the bread’ (Luke 24:1-35). In Honor of Prof. Ulrich Luz, Sacra Scripta, 221–238.
- Moessner, D. P. (2009). Turning status ‘upside down' in Philippi: Christ Jesus’s ‘emptying himself’ as forfeiting any acknowledgment of his ‘equality with God' (Phil 2:6-11). Horizons in Biblical Theology, 31(2), 123-143.
- Moessner, D. P. (2011). ‘Abraham saw my day’: Making greater sense of John 8:48-59 from the LXX version than the MT Genesis 22. In T. S. Caulley & H. Lichtenberger (Eds.), Die Septuaginta und das frühe Christentum (pp. 329–338). Mohr Siebeck
- Moessner, D. P. (2015). Redemption. In S. E. Ballentine (Ed.), The Oxford encyclopedia of the Bible and theology (Vol. 2, pp. 222–227).
- Moessner, D. P. (2018). ‘The living and enduring voice’: Papias as guarantor of early apostolic plotting of incipient synoptic traditions. Early Christianity, 9(4), 484–519.
- Moessner, D. P. (2020). Mark's mysterious ‘beginning’ (1:1–3) as the hermeneutical code to Mark's ‘messianic secret.’ In R. M. Calhoun, D. P. Moessner, & T. Nicklas (Eds.), Modern and ancient literary criticism of the Gospels: Continuing the debate on Gospel genre(s) (pp. 336–377).
- Moessner, D. P. (2020). The problem of the continuity of Acts with Luke, the Church's reception of two separated volumes, and the construction of Luke's theology. In T. Nicklas, K.-W. Niebuhr, & M. Seleznev (Eds.), History and theology in the Gospels: Seventh International East-West Symposium of New Testament Scholars, Moscow, 2016 (pp. 147–167). WUNT.
- Moessner, D. P. (2023). The ‘arc of glory’ in the archē of John (1:1). In D. P. Moessner, P. B. Duff, J. E. Spittler, & R. M. Calhoun (Eds.), Paul, Christian textuality, and the hermeneutics of late antiquity: Essays in honor of Margaret M. Mitchell (pp. 214–237).
