= Helen M. Roberts =

Canadian-American writer and photographer (1896–1983)

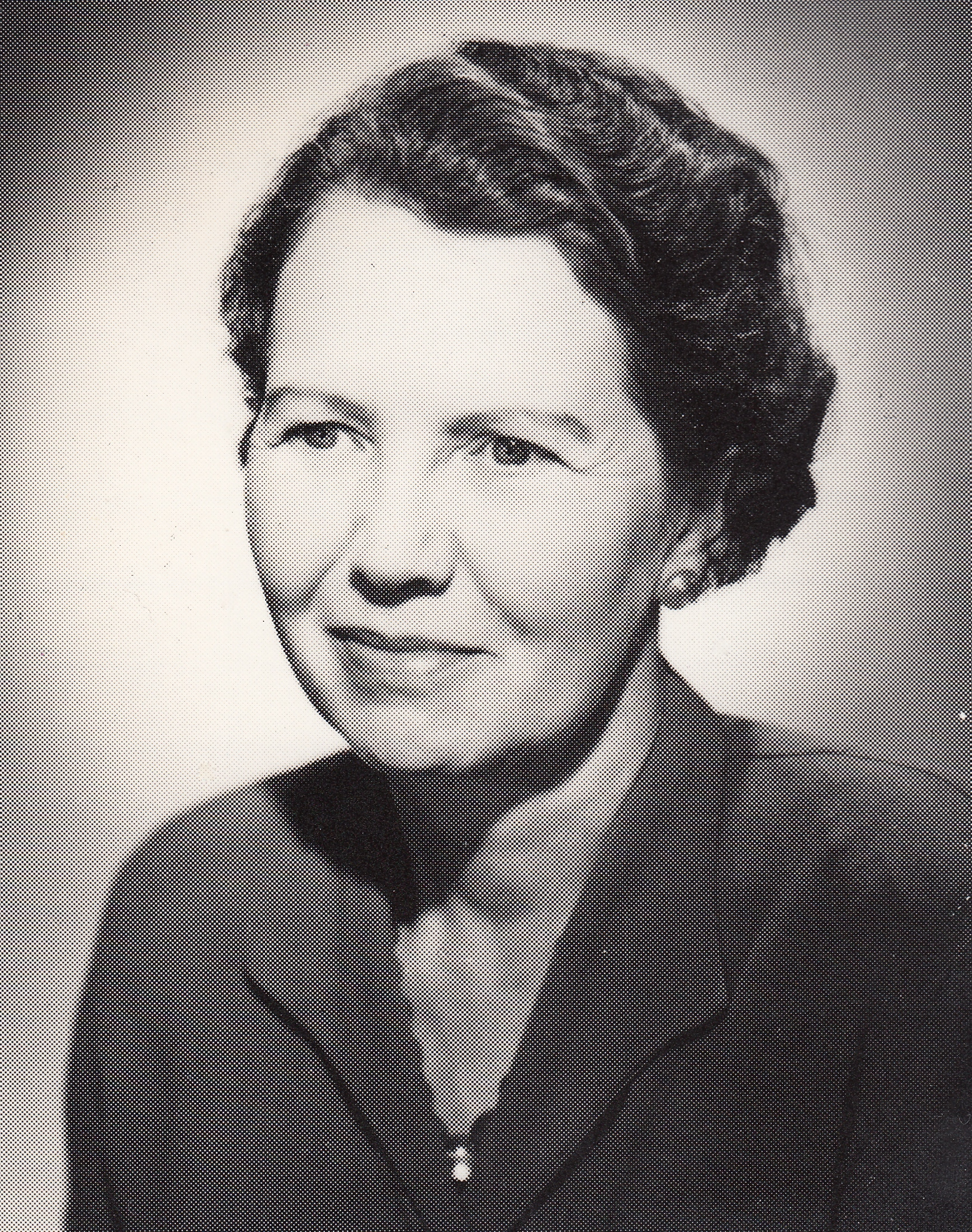
- c. 1945
- Born: January 20, 1896; Toronto, Ontario, Canada
- Died: June 22, 1983 (aged 87); Los Angeles, California, U.S.
- Occupations: Multilingual literacy educator, writer, photographer
- Spouse: Jewell A. Roberts (m. 1916; died 1952)
- Children: Howard Emery, Walter Kenneth, Ethel Muriel, Lawrence, Blasing, Donald Van Norman

Helen Marguerite (Emery) Roberts (January 20, 1896 – June 22, 1983) was an American writer, photographer, and multilingual educator. From 1958 to 1975, she battled illiteracy in Africa, teaching reading, writing, health and Christian religion to thousands of illiterate adults. In the course of her African work, she mentored and sponsored many promising young Africans, encouraging them to pursue higher education, including Barack H. Obama, the father of President of the United States Barack Obama.

== Early life ==
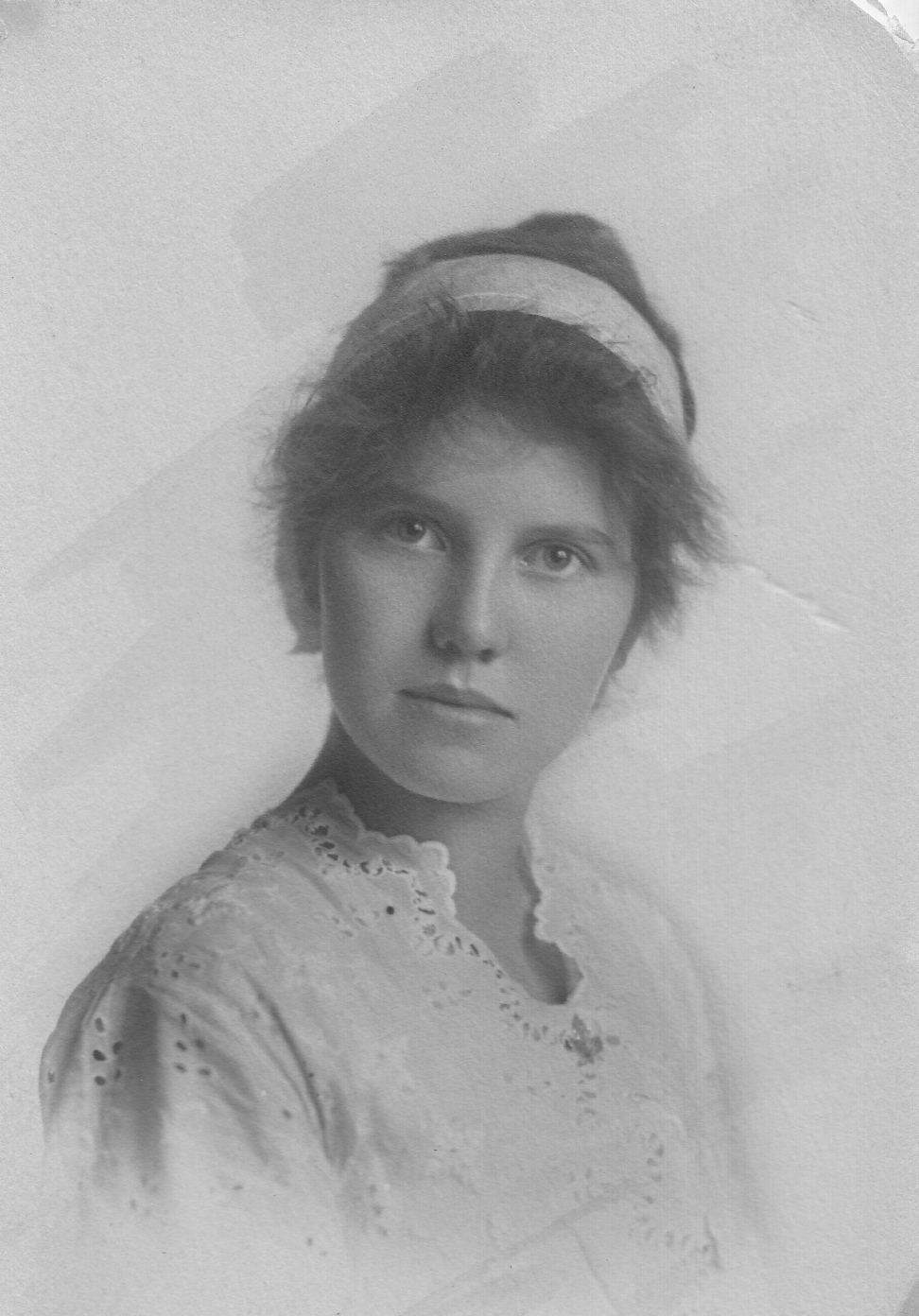
Helen Emery as a college freshman at USC, 1912

Helen Marguerite Emery was born in Toronto, Ontario, Canada, as the daughter of Dr. William John Hunter Emery (a Canadian surgeon) and his wife, Ethel Margaret (Job). In 1911, she moved with her family to Porterville, California, where her father had purchased an orange ranch in pursuit of a less stressful lifestyle. In September 1912, Helen attended University of Southern California, studying pre-med. She became a Student Volunteer, which meant that she pledged herself for missionary service – as a medical missionary. By the end of her second year at USC, family financial struggles resulted in terminating further classwork. In 1916, she married Jewell Roberts (1893–1952). From 1916 to 1927, they lived in Porterville, Bakersfield, Sacramento, Oregon, and Fresno, and during this time had four children: Howard, Kenneth, Muriel, and Donald. While living in Fresno, Helen entered Fresno State University to resume her college education. She practiced teaching in the adult education program, helping Mexican women to read, write and speak English, through practical situations. She graduated and received an Elementary and Jr. High School teaching credential. By 1952, her four children were married, and had graduated from Stanford University. Jewell died February 2, leaving Helen a widow at 56 years old.

== Early literature ==
In 1935 she and her family moved to Berkeley for two years and then to Palo Alto. For the next 23 years, Helen actively wrote and produced more than 60 children's plays for the Palo Alto Children's Theater. She averaged 3 plays per year, while in some years produced as many as 13. She also pursued photography and had her own dark room for her enlargements. She wrote several articles and illustrated them with her photographs in Peninsula Life and other magazines.

In the mid-1940s she became interested in the California Missions. In 1948 to usher in the centennial of California's Gold Rush, Stanford University Press published Mission Tales in 21 small booklets, one for each California mission. While they were still in galley proof, three newspapers – The Fresno Bee, The Sacramento Bee and The Bakersfield Bee, produced them as educational material in 13 episodes of Cavalcade of California, which were transmitted into the schools via Radio KFWB. Later Mission Tales were republished in 7 volumes with three of the small books in each volume. Helen's daughter Muriel provided the more than 250 illustrations for the stories.

== African literacy missionary ==
In 1953, she began her pursuit of battling illiteracy, which resulted in an assignment to help in the Migrant Ministry in California. For the next few years, Helen applied herself as a volunteer to help Santa Clara Valley migrant camp adults and children. She held worship services, and taught the children and the mothers who weren't working by holding classes on sewing, crafts, reading and writing. Helen wrote, photographed and recorded a filmstrip which the migrant ministry used as training in other places. In 1957, Helen met Dr. Frank C. Laubach, who at the time was nicknamed the "Apostle of Literacy". Dr. Laubach was a Methodist teacher and writer, who developed a method of teaching people of remote cultures how to read and write in their own language. The program was called "Each One, Teach One", which has influenced a worldwide literacy movement over many decades. Her meeting with Dr. Laubach ultimately resulted in her assignment to a new 2 year Laubach Literacy program in Africa.

1958 was to be the first of 17 years that Helen spent in Kenya and later in Rhodesia. Africa at that time was a country where eight of every ten adults could not read or write. At first, she assisted with English language classes for African adults who were literate in their own language. Then she learned the native Swahili and helped teach classes of adult illiterates. She continued her writing of books on language, health, family finance, religion, and a variety of other subjects in the Swahili language. She also trained many teachers in the Laubach method of attacking adult illiteracy. While in Kenya, she wrote the scripts for 26 television lessons, and assisted with the filming details, thus pioneering the use of television in battling illiteracy in Africa. She also wrote many plays as another means to teach life lessons. During her early years in Kenya, Helen wrote Dr. Laubach's biography entitled Champion of the Silent Billion.

In Dr. Laubach's book Forty Years With The Silent Billion, he mentions that Helen Roberts was one of the most dedicated workers that the literacy campaign had ever had. In spite of her advanced age (she was a grandmother of fifteen when she moved to Africa), her work in Kenya contributed much to the remarkable progress of literacy in that country. The Kenyan leaders were enthusiastic about her work, and paid her high tribute.

In 1959, students traveled to the US in a coordinated "airlift", substantially sponsored by Harry Belafonte, Jackie Robinson, Sidney Poitier, and Senator John F. Kennedy's family foundation. Helen Roberts is mentioned in the detailed accounting of this initiative in Tom Shachtman's Airlift to America. According to Shachtman, subsequent airlifts coordinated by a nonprofit entity known as the African American Students Foundation would send hundreds of East African students to the US. These students would achieve a remarkable record of accomplishment, many of whom returned to Africa, to significant positions in government and society. One member was Wangari Maathai, who became the first African woman to become a Nobel Peace Prize laureate.

Tom Mboya, a Kenyan politician during Jomo Kenyatta's government, was founder of the Nairobi People's Congress Party. He was particularly instrumental in coordinating the airlifts, and securing financial aid for those Kenyan students. Mboya was a strong supporter of the Kenyan literacy campaign, as he felt strongly that literacy was an important fundamental step towards political independence. He mentions in his book Freedom and After, that the literacy 'picture' in Kenya was growing brighter, due to the "tireless work by an American lady, Mrs. Helen Roberts, in organizing 'workshops' for literacy teachers, writing Laubach primers in vernacular languages, and preparing literacy lessons for television".

In 1960, Helen was contacted by two women, Stella Greenway and Margaret Carmody, who had been seeking to establish a literacy program in Rhodesia. Helen in Kenya and Louise d'Oliveira in the Congo, visited Harara (then Salisbury) and provided charts, copies of primers and the encouragement to form the Adult Literacy Organization (ALO). This provided a turning point in Rhodesia's literacy movement, as Helen provided the essential know-how for the early campaign. In 1963, Helen moved to Salisbury with her friend, Alice Sanderson, and provided the fledgling ALO with material and training for volunteer tutors. By 1965, they had trained 715 volunteer teachers in Rhodesia. By the 1970s, ALO was renamed Adult Literacy Organization of Rhodesia (ALOR) and in 1980 following Helen's return to America, it was renamed the Adult Literacy Organization of Zimbabwe. Alice Sanderson had resigned as director in 1974, but remained a literacy consultant until the late 1980s.

Helen spent 12 years in Rhodesia, teaching, writing, and training volunteer workers and teachers. While In Rhodesia, she wrote their first Shona language primer, and published African Scenes and Symbols, a book of forty meditations and forty full page photographs of African Scenes. She published two additional books entitled Search for Love and If You Only Knew. She also wrote a variety of religious novels, meditations, and prayers, many of which were eventually published.

== Mentor to Barack Obama Sr. ==
In the course of her teachings and writings in Kenya and Rhodesia, Roberts and her literacy associate Elizabeth "Betty" Mooney Kirk would cross paths with many inspired and gifted Africans, in whom they saw great promise. Helen and Betty were instrumental in coordinating passage for many of these students to America to further their education, with the hopes that they would return to Africa to aid in the literacy cause and improve African leadership.

One young man who showed particular promise was named Barack Hussein Obama. Helen and Betty hired him, first as a literacy program office clerk. Later when Helen and Betty decided to publish reading primers in five tribal languages—Kikuyu, Kamba, Kalenjin, Masai, and Dholuo, they chose Obama to write three primers in his native Luo language. They coordinated first the completion of his correspondence school certificate, and later his American college applications which culminated in his acceptance to the University of Hawaii. When he missed the first airlift to America, Helen and Betty stepped in and raised money for him to travel on a parallel flight. Betty paid his entire first year tuition. Helen committed herself to watching over and financially supporting the family that he had left behind, for as long as she remained in Nairobi. She accepted this responsibility in spite of her very limited source of income, which consisted of a small social security check each month. Obama met Stanley Ann Dunham in 1960, while at the University of Hawaii, and they married in 1961. Their son, the future President Barack Hussein Obama II, was born that year.

Helen is also referenced in Barack Obama's Dreams from my Father. Her participation in Obama Sr's mentoring was further mentioned in Mike Seccombe's Unlikely Events Recall Story of This President.

== Final years ==
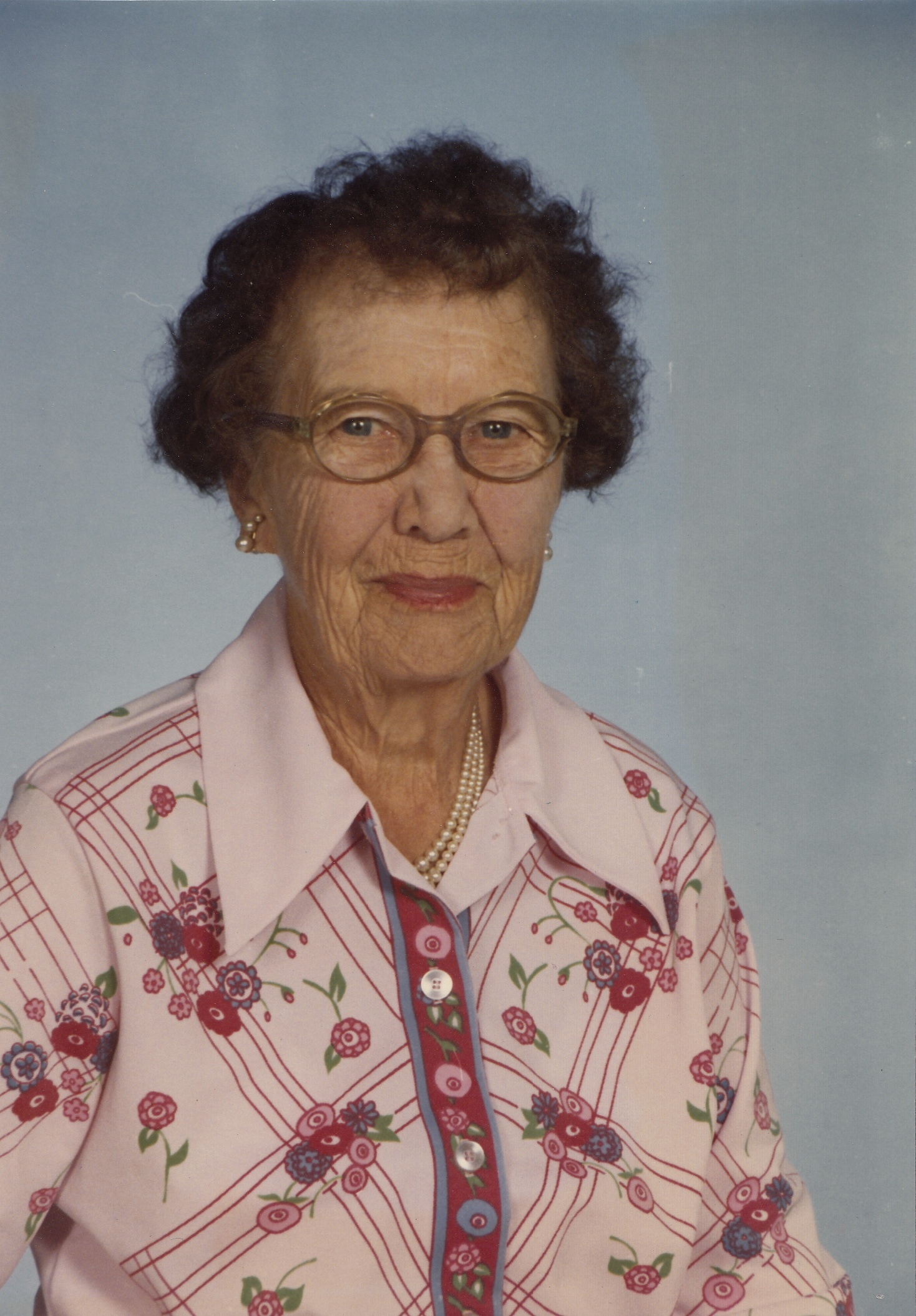
Helen in California, c. 1980

In 1975 at the age of 79, Roberts returned to Los Angeles, where she retired to Leisure World. She joined a writing group that wrote and produced television plays. At 85 years old, she wrote a series of books relating to religious themes, wherein each book contained a collection of images that she painted, based on her many photographs taken while abroad.

In 1982, Helen began her final project; her autobiography. This 305-page project, The Unfolding Trail, was completed shortly before her death in 1983.

== Bibliography ==
=== Children's stories, plays, and pageants ===
- The Little Shepherd Who Was Left Behind (1938) A Christmas play in three parts. Banner Play Bureau, Inc.
- Path to the Left (1939) A one-act comedy. Eldridge Entertainment House, Inc.
- The Fourth King (December 1940) A children's radio play. The Gospel Trumpet, vol. 60, n49, pp. 20–22
- The Miracle of The Christmas Creche (1941) A Christmas play in one act. Banner Play Bureau, Inc.
- The Keys to Happiness (1942) A Christmas play in one act. Banner Play Bureau, Inc.
- A Candle For The Prince (1943) A Christmas play in one act. Banner Play Bureau, Inc.
- The Boy Dreamer (1943) 3-act play on Columbus. Plays: The Drama Magazine for Young People, Vol. 3, pp. 25–?
- No More Christmas (1944) A Christmas play in one act. Minneapolis: T. S. Denison
- Pinkie and The Tin Bugler (1944) A Christmas play in one act. Banner Play Bureau, Inc.
- Ghosts or Guests (1944) A comedy in one act for nine women. Banner Play Bureau.
- The Mad Tea Party (1945) A farce comedy in one act for eight women. Banner Play Bureau.
- The Little Lame Shepherd (1945) A Christmas play in two parts. Banner Play Bureau, Inc.
- Double, Double Trouble (1945) A comedy in one act for 8 women or teen age girls. Banner Play Bureau, Inc
- And Lo, The Stars (1946) A Christmas play in two scenes. Banner Play Bureau, Inc.
- The Hope of The World (1946) A Christmas Pageant in eight episodes. Banner Play Bureau, Inc.
- Aunt Kitty to the Rescue (1946) A comedy in one act for eight women. Banner Play Bureau, Inc.
- The Warrior of San Raphael (March 1946) The Catholic Student Magazine, pages 14–15, 26, 28
- Beneath the Thunderoak (December 1946) A children's play in two scenes. The Catholic Miss of America, pp. 12–13, 18, 38
- The Song of the Calliope (March 1947) Catholic Youth, pages 18–19
- The Star Grew Dim (1947) A play with all-male cast. Standard Christmas Book, n7, pp. 21–30
- Lincoln the Immortal (February 1947) A children's play. The Catholic Boy, pp. 6–7,18
- He Lives (April 1947) Trails for Juniors, v6, n4, pages 1–2
- The Littlest Angel (1947) A Christmas play in one act. Banner Play Bureau, Inc.
- Mother Cabrini (November 1947) A three-scene play for children. Manna, pp. 264–273
- Mission Tales (1947) A collection of children's stories each based on a historical accounting of the California Missions. Stanford University Press.
- The Lost Garment (March 1948) A children's play. The Catholic Boy, pp. 10–11,20,24
- Parade of California's Progress (1948) Banner Play Bureau, Inc.
- They Found Gold in California (1948) A discovery of gold play in one act. Banner Play Bureau, Inc.
- Junior High Plays for Special Occasions (1948) A collection of ten- to twenty-minute plays for junior high and the upper grades. Banner Bureau.
- The Golden Moth (November 1949) Wee Wisdom, a magazine for boys and girls, pp. 12–14, 27
- The Cathedral Miracle (1950) A Christmas play in two short scenes. Banner Play Bureau, Inc.
- Joseph's Garden (March 1951) A two scene play for Eastertime. Country Gentlewoman League, pp. 1–14
- Pedro the In-Between (1951) Our Little Friend, Mountain View, Calif., v62, n37, pp. 1–2
- The Servant at the Inn (1955) A Christmas play in one act. Banner Play Bureau.
- The Light of The World (1958) A Christmas pageant in six episodes. Banner Play Bureau, Inc.
- The Long Road to Bethlehem (19??) A Christmas play. Eldridge Publishing Company, Franklin, Ohio, Eldridge Christmas Entertainments.
- The Lonely Fir Tree (19??) A children's play in 3 scenes. Plays, Inc.
- Pocahontas, the Tomboy Princess (19??) An historical play.

=== Biographies and other works ===
- Discovery By Accident? (March 1947) Peninsula Life, pp. 18, 50–51
- Highroad of The Spaniards (March 1947) Peninsula Life, pp. 20, 26–27
- Follow the Joshua Trail (March 1947) Westways, pages 20–21
- Father Junipera Serra (April 1947) Peninsula Life, pages 16, 49–50
- Carrera De Gallo or Cock Chase (April 1947) Peninsula Life, page 48
- Mission San Jose – 150 Years Old (May 1947) Peninsula Life, pages 19,48–49
- California (June 1947) Peninsula Life, page 10
- The Show-Offs (June 1947) Peninsula Life, pages 25, 47–48
- San Francisco (July 1947) Peninsula Life, page 15
- Roundup Time in Early California (July 1947) Peninsula Life, pages 24, 50, 51
- Santa Clara (August 1947) Peninsula Life, page 7
- The Staff of Life (August 1947) Peninsula Life, pages 25, 37–40
- Ibsen And I (August 1947) The Author & Journalist, page 11
- San Mateo's Saints (September 1947) Peninsula Life, page 7
- Rosicrucian "Theatre of the Sky" (September 1947) Peninsula Life, pages 21, 39–41
- The Bay Islands (October 1947) Peninsula Life, page 6
- San Jose (November 1947) Peninsula Life, page 11
- Christmas in Early California (December 1947) Peninsula Life, pages 27, 52, 54
- New Year's Point (January 1948) Peninsula Life, page 12
- Canoes, Caravels and Clippers (January 1948) Peninsula Life, pages 18, 47–49g
- "Mission Tales" (March 1948) Peninsula Life, page 22
- Helen M. Roberts (March 1948) Peninsula Life, pages 42–43
- Glamorous Queen Nefertiti (March 1948) Peninsula Life, pages 31, 65–66
- Gold Empire Builder (April 1948) Peninsula Life, pages 25–26, 50–51
- Royalty in a Tree-Top Cradle (May 1948) Peninsula Life, pages 42, 50–51
- How Long Will Redwoods Reign? (June 1948) Peninsula Life, pages 24–25, 32
- Autumn Calls You (September 1948) Peninsula Life, pages 26–27
- Imprint of Historic Trek On Our Land (October 1948) Peninsula Life, pages 21–22
- Early Education Trails (February 1949) Peninsula Life, pages 12–13
- The Miracle of the Monarchs (February 1951) Our Little Friend, Mountain View CA, v62, n8, pages 1–2
- Champion of the Silent Billion (1961). The story of Dr. Frank C. Laubach, Apostle of Literacy

=== African publications ===
- Kuanza Kusoma (1959–1962) – Swahili Primers. Nairobi: East African Literature Bureau.
- Kuanza Kusoma Kitabu cha II
- Kuanza Kusoma Kitabu cha III
- Kuanza Kusoma - Kitabu cha Tatu
- Njia Za Afya (1959). Swahili: Ways to Health. Prepared Under the Direction of Helen M. Roberts. Illustrated by Sheila Mayo. Eagle Press
- Njia Za Kutunza Pesa Zako: kituba cha watu wazima wanaojifunza kusoma (1960) – (How to Look After Your Money. A Reader for Adult Literacy Schemes. Prepared Under the Direction of Helen M. Roberts for Adult Literacy Section, Kenya Education Department.). Swahili. Eagle Press
- Kuanza kusoma: usomaji wa watu wazima (1962). Literacy centre, kitabu hiki chafuata niija ya kusomesha inayotumiwa na Frank Laubach. Eagle Press.
- Kitabu cha kuandika kwa kuanza kusoma (1962). Eagle Press.
- In the Beginning; Retold from the Bible (1962). East African Literature Bureau.
- Kitabu cha kuhesabu kwa Kuanza kusoma Kenya Broadcasting Corp (television script), East African Literature Bureau, 1963
- Know Yourself (1963) – A guide for adolescent girls. East African Literature Bureau.
- Mother and Child (1963) – Child rearing. East African Literature Bureau.
- Ekuqaleni [In the Beginning] (1965) Bulawayo Daystar Publications.
- African Scenes and Symbols (1965). A book of forty meditations and forty full page photographs of African Scenes. Rhodesian Christian Press, Daystar Publications.
- Munho Woruzivo (1966) Parables, Shona – Bulawayo: Daystar Publications
- Kuanza Kusoma, kimetungwa kwa usomaji wa watu wazima, Volume 2 (1969). East African Literature Bureau. Swahili language.
- Search for Love (1975). Mambo Press, Senga Road, Gwelo.
- If You Only Knew (1976) – Reflections based on Scripture. Mambo Press, Senga Road, Gwelo.
