= Texas Christian University =

Private research university in Fort Worth, Texas, US

- Motto: Disciplina est Facultas
- Motto in English: "Knowledge is power"
- Type: Private research university
- Established: 1873; 153 years ago
- Accreditation: SACS
- Religious affiliation: Christian Church (Disciples of Christ)
- Academic affiliations: CIC; CONAHEC; ORAU; NAICU
- Endowment: $3 billion (FY2026)
- Budget: $779.9 million (FY2026)
- Chancellor: Victor J. Boschini Jr.
- Provost: Floyd L. Wormley, Jr.
- Academic staff: 748 (fall 2024)
- Students: 12,980 (fall 2025)
- Undergraduates: 11,152 (fall 2025)
- Postgraduates: 1,828 (fall 2025)
- Location: Fort Worth, Texas, United States; 32.7096°N 97.3640°W
- Campus: 325 acres (132 ha); Large city
- Newspaper: TCU 360
- Colors: Purple and white
- Nickname: Horned Frogs
- Sporting affiliations: NCAA Division I FBS – Big 12; PRC
- Mascot: Horned Frog
- Website: tcu.edu

Texas Christian University (TCU) is a private research university in Fort Worth, Texas, United States. It was established in 1873 by brothers Addison and Randolph Clark as the AddRan Male & Female College. It is affiliated with the Christian Church (Disciples of Christ).

The campus is located on 302 acres (122 ha) about 4 miles (6.5 km) from downtown Fort Worth. The university consists of nine constituent colleges and schools. It is classified among "R2: Doctoral Universities – High research spending and doctorate production". According to the National Science Foundation, the university received approximately $24 million in research and development funding for fiscal year 2023, ranking it 284th in the nation for research revenue and expenditures.

TCU's mascot is Superfrog, based on the Texas state reptile, the horned frog. For most varsity sports, TCU competes in NCAA Division I as a member of the Big 12 Conference. As of fall 2025, the university enrolled 12,980 students, with 11,152 being undergraduates.

== History ==
=== Origins in Fort Worth, 1869–1873 ===
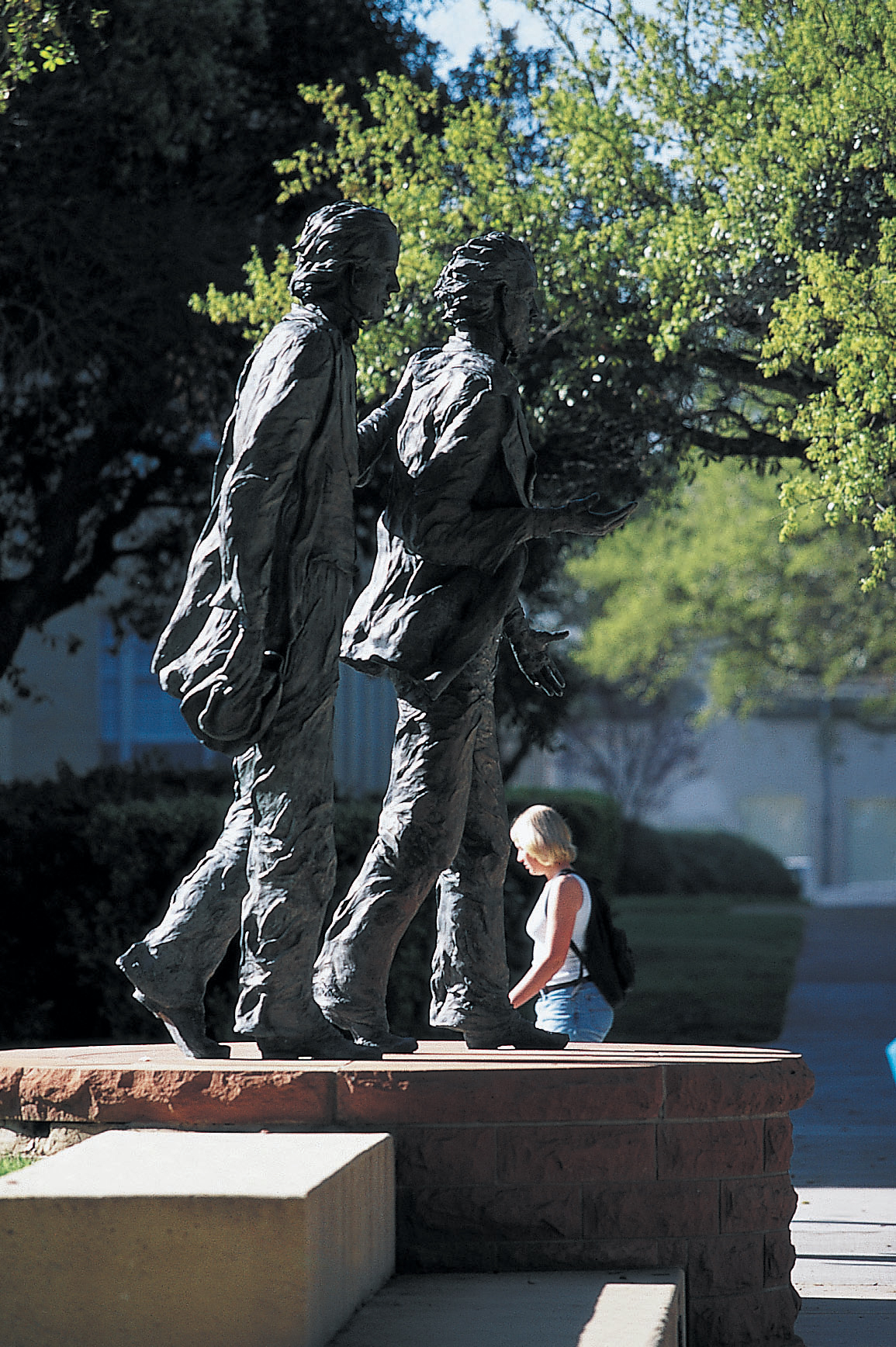
Statue of TCU founders Addison and Randolph Clark

The East Texas brothers Addison and Randolph Clark, with the support of their father Joseph A. Clark, first founded Texas Christian University. The Clarks were scholar-preacher/teachers associated with the Restoration Movement. These early leaders of the Restoration Movement were the spiritual ancestors of the modern Disciples of Christ and the Churches of Christ, as well as being major proponents of education.

Upon their return from service in the Confederacy during the Civil War, brothers Addison and Randolph embarked on a mission to establish a children's preparatory school in Fort Worth. This educational institution, known as the Male & Female Seminary of Fort Worth, was in operation from 1869 to 1874. The Clarks shared a collective vision of creating a higher education institution that would embody Christian values while maintaining a non-sectarian and intellectually open-minded spirit. To realize this vision, they procured five city blocks in downtown Fort Worth in 1869.

But from 1867 to 1874, the character of Fort Worth changed substantially due to the commercial influence of the Chisholm Trail, the principal route for moving Texas cattle to the Kansas rail heads. An influx of cattle, men, and money transformed the sleepy frontier village. The area around the property purchased by the Clarks for their college soon housed stretch of saloons, gambling halls, dance parlors, and brothels. By 1872, it had acquired it the nickname of "Hell's Half Acre". The Clarks found an alternative site for their college at Thorp Spring, a small community 40 miles (60 km) in Hood County to the southwest near the frontier of Comanche and Kiowa territory.

=== Move to Thorp Spring, 1873–1895 ===
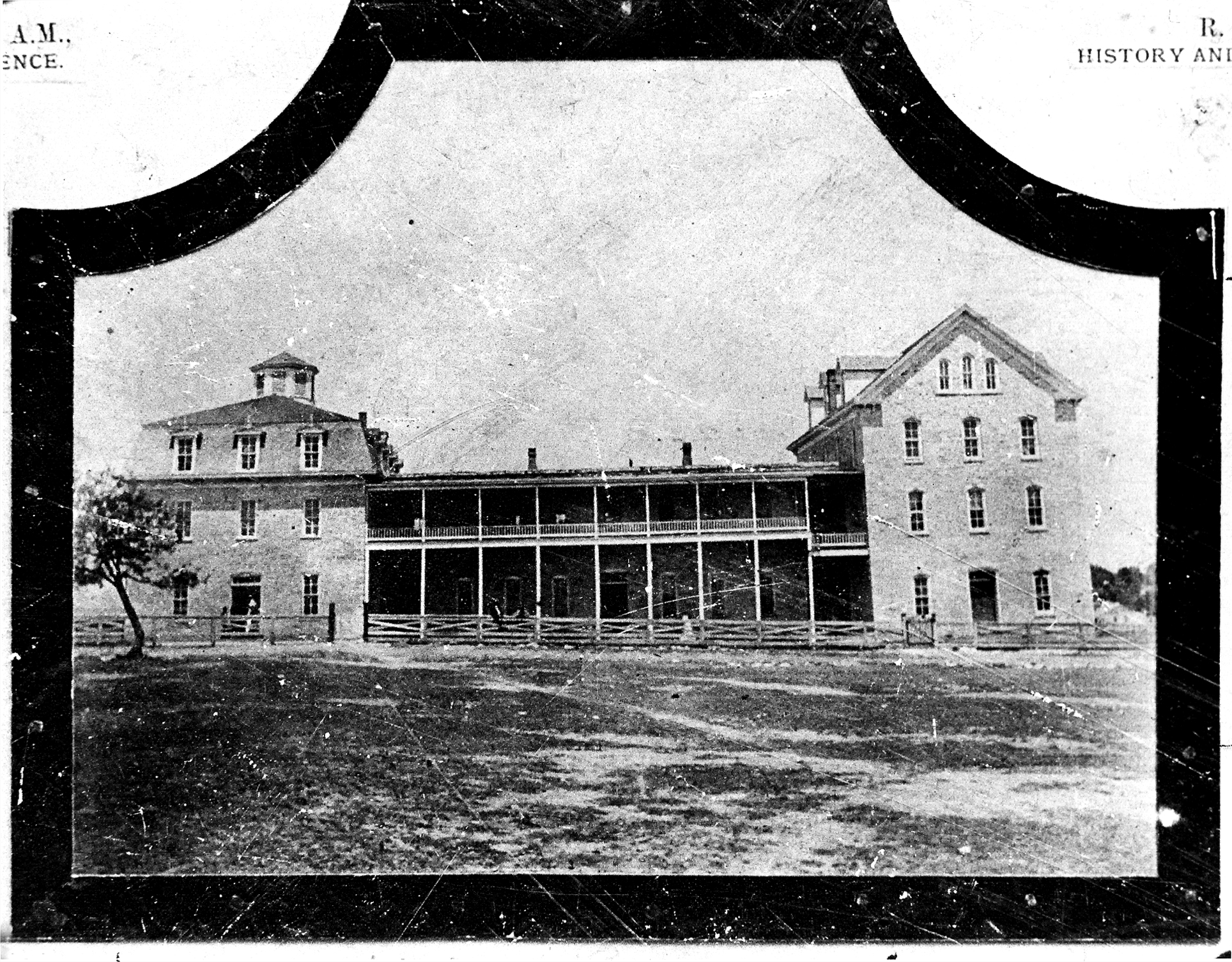
Thorp Spring, Texas, campus

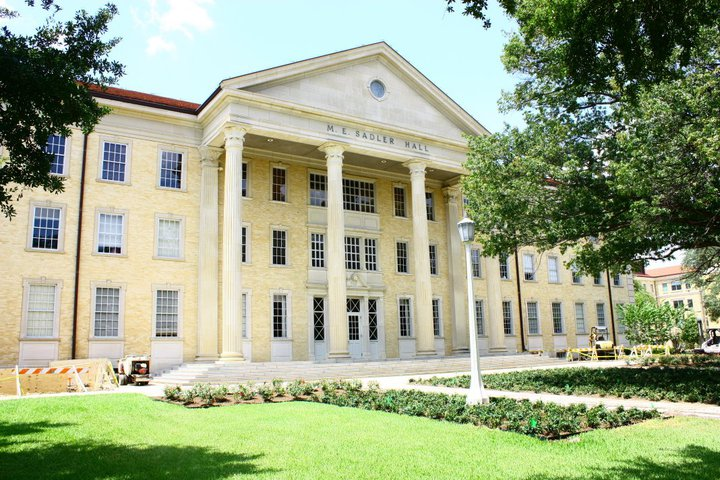
Sadler Hall, home to the TCU John V. Roach Honors College and other academic and administrative units

In 1873 the Clark brothers moved South to Thorp Spring and founded Add-Ran Male & Female College. TCU recognizes 1873 as its founding year, as it continues to preserve the original college through the AddRan College of Liberal Arts.

Add-Ran College was one of the first coeducational institutions of higher education west of the Mississippi River. The college expanded quickly from its first enrollment in fall 1873 of 13 students. Shortly thereafter, annual enrollment ranged from 200 to 400. At one time more than 100 counties of Texas were represented in the student body. The Clark brothers also recruited prestigious professors from all over the South to join them at Thorp Spring.

In 1889 Add-Ran College formed an official partnership with what would become the Christian Church (Disciples of Christ), though the church never enjoyed any administrative role at TCU. In 1889 the school was renamed Add-Ran Christian University.

=== Move to Waco, roots of rivalry, 1895–1910 ===
The need for a larger population and transportation base prompted the university to relocate to Waco from 1895 to 1910; it purchased the campus of the defunct Waco Female College. The institution was renamed Texas Christian University in 1902, often called TCU. It was during this 15-year sojourn in Waco that TCU in 1896 entered the ranks of intercollegiate football and adopted its school colors of purple and white, as well as its distinctive Horned Frog mascot. A rivalry developed between TCU and nearby Baylor University.

=== Return to Fort Worth, 1910–present ===
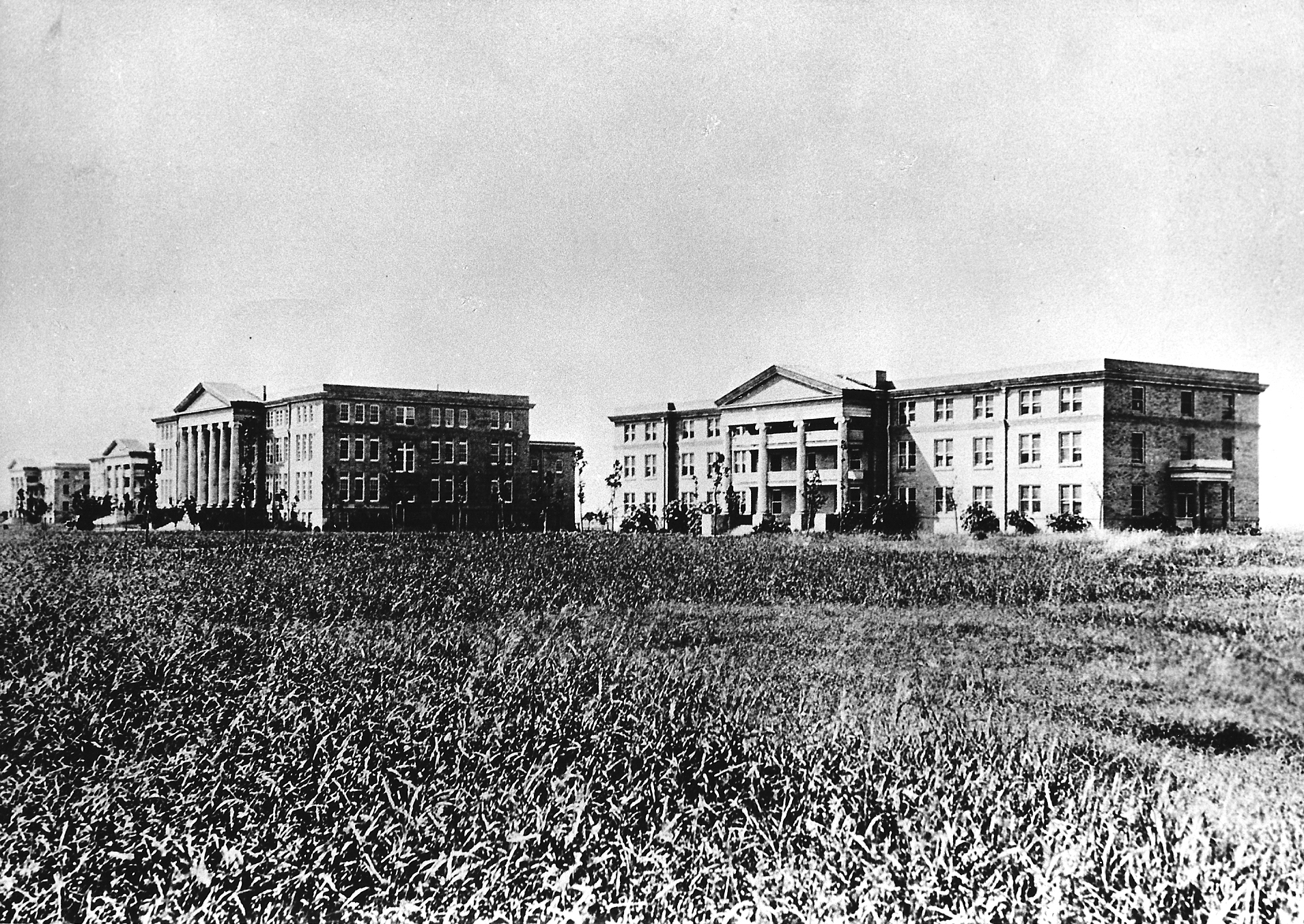
Early image of the TCU campus in Fort Worth

In 1910, a fire of unknown origin destroyed the university's Main Administration building. A rebuilding project was planned, but before reconstruction could begin, a group of enterprising Fort Worth businessmen offered the university $200,000 in rebuilding money ($6,614,210 in 2024) and a 50-acre (200,000 m^{2}) campus as an inducement to return to Fort Worth.

The university received its first charitable endowment in 1923, from Mary Couts Burnett, the recent widow of Samuel Burk Burnett, a rancher, banker, and oilman. Burnett received half of her late husband's estate of $6 million ($110 million in 2024), and in her 1923 will she bequeathed her entire estate, including a half-interest in the substantial 6666 ("Four Sixes") Ranch, to TCU. Mary Couts Burnett Library is named after her. In 1948, the Ed Landreth Hall and Auditorium was built.

John Lord was a native of Deer Island, New Brunswick who became dean of Texas Christian University but was murdered by 18-year old Arthur Clayton Hester.

== Campus ==
TCU's campus sits on 302 acres (1.22 km^{2}) of developed campus (325 acres total) which is located four miles (6.5 km) from downtown Fort Worth.

The TCU campus is divided into roughly three areas: a residential area, an academic area, and Worth Hills. The two main areas of campus, the residential and academic areas, are separated by University Drive, an oak-lined street that bisects the campus. Residence halls, the Student Union, and the Campus Commons are all located to the West of University Drive, while the library, chapel, and most academic buildings are located to the east of it. All of TCU's surrounding streets are lined by live oaks.

Roughly half of TCU undergraduate students live on campus. Housing is divided among 16 residence halls and on-campus apartment complexes.

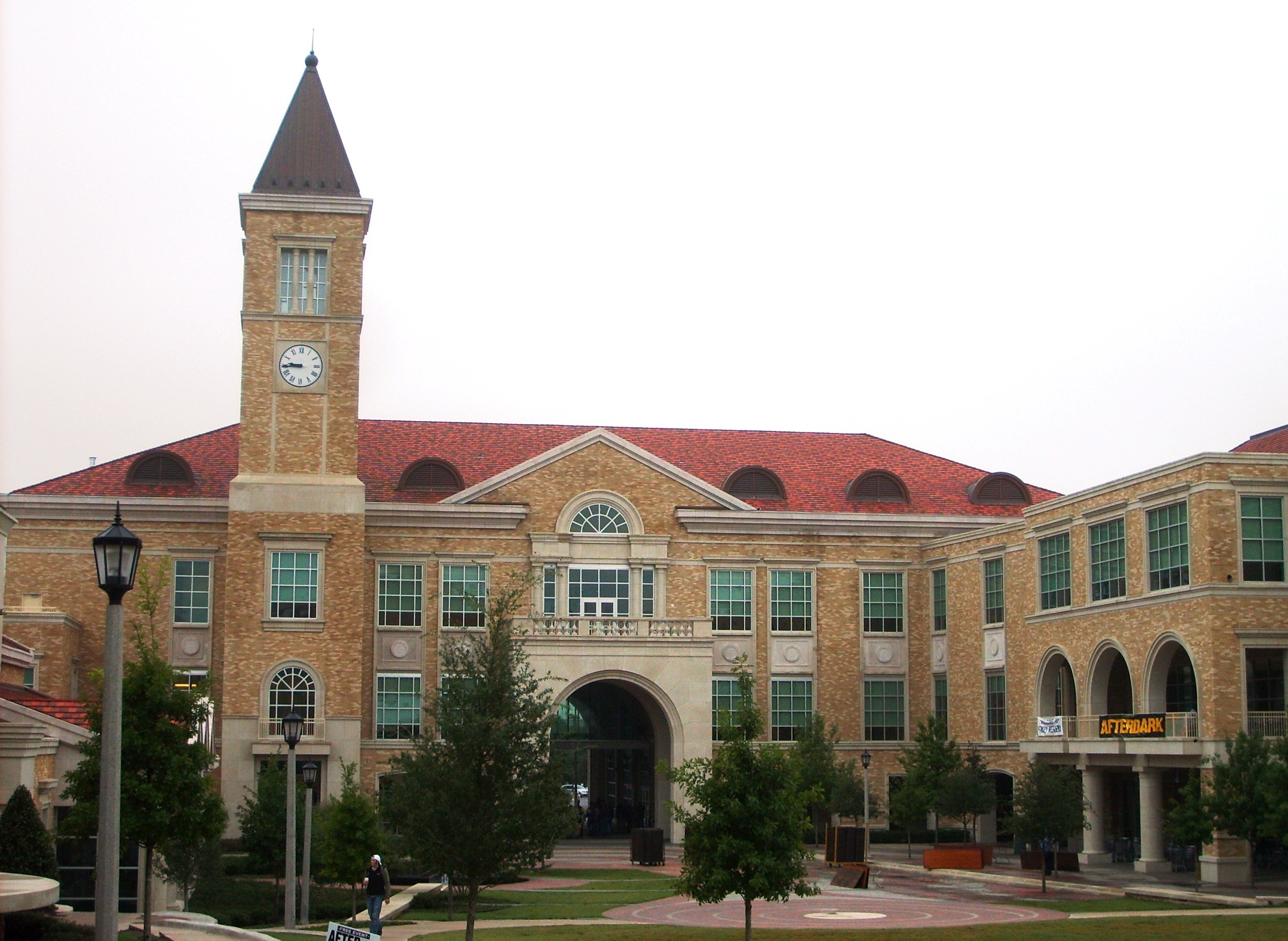
Brown-Lupton University Union

The neo-classical beaux-arts architecture at TCU incorporates features consistent with much of the Art Deco-influenced architecture of older buildings throughout Fort Worth. Most of the buildings at TCU are constructed with a specially blended golden brick tabbed by brick suppliers as "TCU buff." Nearly all of the buildings have red-tile roofs, while the oldest buildings on campus are supported by columns of various styles.

A notable exception to this rule is Robert Carr Chapel, which was the first building on campus to be constructed of bricks other than TCU buff. The chapel is built of a distinctive salmon-colored brick, a deviation that caused alumni to protest when the building opened in 1953.

TCU is home to the Starpoint School, a laboratory school for children with dysgraphia, dyslexia, ADHD, and other learning disabilities. KinderFrogs School, an early-intervention laboratory pre-school for children with Down syndrome, is housed in the same building as Starpoint.

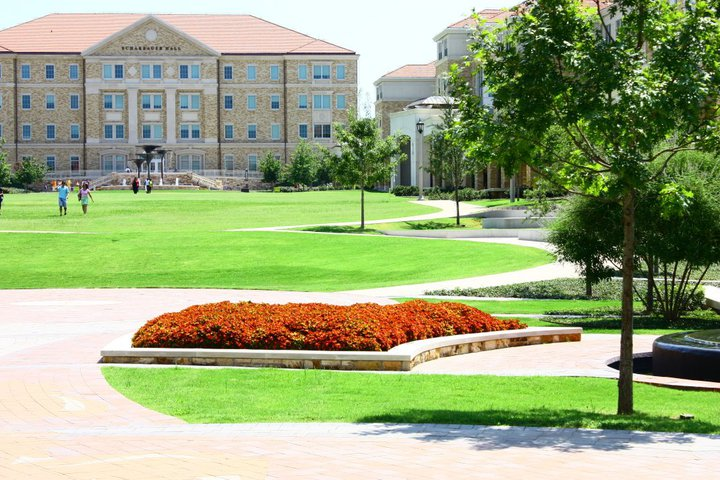
Scharbauer Hall

Since 2006, much of the campus has been under construction, and many buildings have been either renovated or replaced. The old Student Center was demolished in 2008 and replaced with Scharbauer Hall, which opened in 2010 and houses the bulk of AddRan College's offices and classrooms. Renovations to Erma Lowe Hall, the building that houses the School for Classical & Contemporary Dance, were completed in 2011. A new academic building for Brite Divinity School – the W. Oliver and Nell A. Harrison Building – was completed in 2012.

The 717-seat Van Cliburn Concert Hall at TCU opened in 2022; the TCU Music Center had opened in 2020.

== Academics ==
=== Undergraduate admissions ===
Undergraduate admissions statistics
- 2023 entering class
- Admit rate: 42.6% (▲ +16)
- Yield rate: 24.1% (▼ −1.1)

Test scores middle 50%
- SAT Total: 1140–1345
- ACT Composite: 26–31

The 2022 annual ranking of U.S. News & World Report categorizes TCU as "more selective". For the Class of 2027 (enrolled fall 2023), TCU received 20,517 applications and accepted 8,740 (42.6%). Of those accepted, 2,488 enrolled, a yield rate (the percentage of accepted students who choose to attend the university) of 28.5%. TCU's freshman retention rate is 94.3%, with 85.6% going on to graduate within six years.

The enrolled first-year class of 2025 had the following standardized test scores: the middle 50% range (25th–75th percentile) of SAT scores was 1140–1345, while the middle 50% range of ACT scores was 26–31.

The university experienced a record number of applicants in 2011, when over 19,000 students applied (a 5,000-student increase from 2010). The applicant pool also set a record with 60% applicants from out of state, whereas usually 1/3 of applicants were from out-of-state. While heightened national recognition due to TCU's victory in the 2011 Rose Bowl is one contributing factor, the university has experienced a steady growth for some time. In 2000, only 4,500 students applied. In 2023, out-of-state students accounted for 52 percent of the undergraduate student body, with the majority of those students coming from California.

High school seniors who have been accepted must maintain solid academic performance senior year during the spring and not show signs of senioritis; in 2012, national media reported on a letter the admissions dean had sent to 100 college-bound seniors, threatening to rescind offers of admission without satisfactory letters of explanation for the slump.

Fall first-time freshman statistics
	2021	2020	2019	2018	2017	2016
Applicants	19,782	21,145	19,028	20,156	19,740	19,972
Admits	10,606	10,155	8,966	8,210	8,110	7,506
Admit rate	53.6	48.0	47.1	40.7	41.1	37.6
Enrolled	2,560	2,287	2,159	2,194	1,955	1,888
Yield rate	24.1	22.5	24.1	26.7	24.1	25.2
ACT composite* (out of 36)	26–31	25–31	25–31	26–30	25–30	25–30
SAT composite* (out of 1600)	1140–1345	1120–1310	1150–1340	1150–1343	1130–1330	—
* middle 50% range

=== Reputation and rankings ===
Academic rankings

National
- Forbes: 120
- U.S. News & World Report: 97 (tie)
- Washington Monthly: 922
- WSJ/College Pulse: 214

Global
- U.S. News & World Report: 1,752 (tie)

USNWR graduate school rankings
Business	43 (tie)
Education	114 (tie)
Medicine: Primary Care	
Medicine: Research	Tier 4

USNWR departmental rankings
Chemistry	161 (tie)
English	131 (tie)
Fine Arts	178 (tie)
History	104 (tie)
Mathematics	173 (tie)
Nursing: Anesthesia	12 (tie)
Physics	167 (tie)
Psychology	214 (tie)
Social Work	142 (tie)
Speech-Language Pathology	74 (tie)

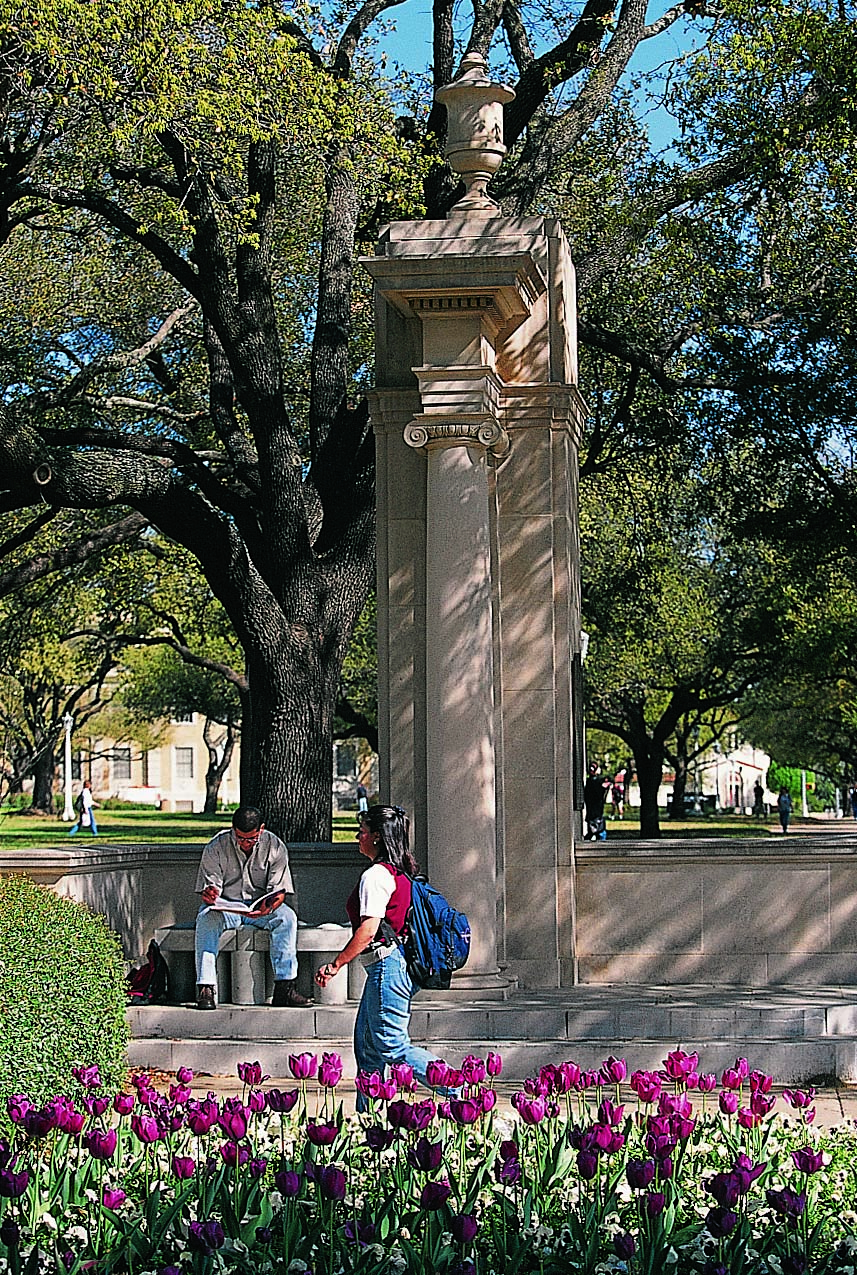
Veterans Plaza

TCU is classified as a Doctoral University: Higher Research Activity. TCU is accredited by the Southern Association of Colleges and Schools. As of 2025, TCU is ranked by U.S. News & World Report as No. 105 (tied) among National Universities.

=== Academic divisions ===
The university offers 117 undergraduate majors, 62 master's programs, and 25 doctoral programs. Among the university's most popular majors are Business, which accounts for roughly 25% of TCU undergraduates, and Journalism/Strategic Communications, which accounts for roughly 20% of TCU undergraduates. Nursing and Education are also popular majors, and many students choose to major in more than one field.

- AddRan College of Liberal Arts
- Bob Schieffer College of Communication
- College of Education
- College of Fine Arts
- College of Science and Engineering
- Harris College of Nursing and Health Sciences
- M. J. Neeley School of Business
- Anne Burnett Marion School of Medicine
- School of Interdisciplinary Studies
- John V. Roach Honors College

In addition, TCU hosts the Brite Divinity School, a related institution run by the Disciples of Christ that is housed on TCU's campus and whose students have full access and use of TCU facilities. Graduates of Brite receive their degrees from TCU directly and are considered full graduates of the university.

In 2015, TCU and the University of North Texas Health Science Center announced the creation of an MD-granting medical school jointly administered by the two institutions. The school accepted its first class of 60 students in 2019 with plans for 240 students when fully enrolled.

The Neeley School of Business ranked as the No. 25 best undergraduate business school in the country in2023 by Poets and Quants.

TCU is an educational partner to the US military and serves host to reserve officer training corps (ROTC) programs for two different service branches, the US Air Force ROTC's Detachment 845 "Flying Frogs" and the US Army ROTC's "Horned Frog Battalion". Since 1951, nearly 1000 TCU graduates have received Army commissions through the ROTC program.

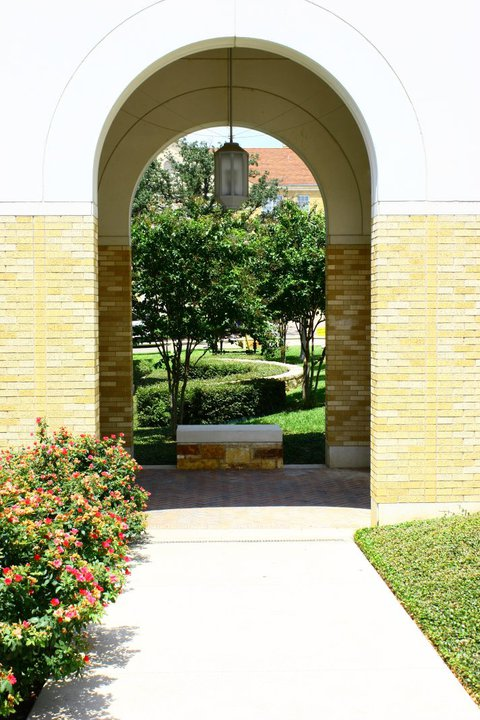
Archway

During World War II, TCU was one of 131 colleges and universities nationally that took part in the V-12 Navy College Training Program which offered students a path to a Navy commission.

The university operates the 450-acre southern white rhinoceros preserve, TCU Rhino Initiative. Doctor Michael Slattery established it in 2014.

== Student life ==
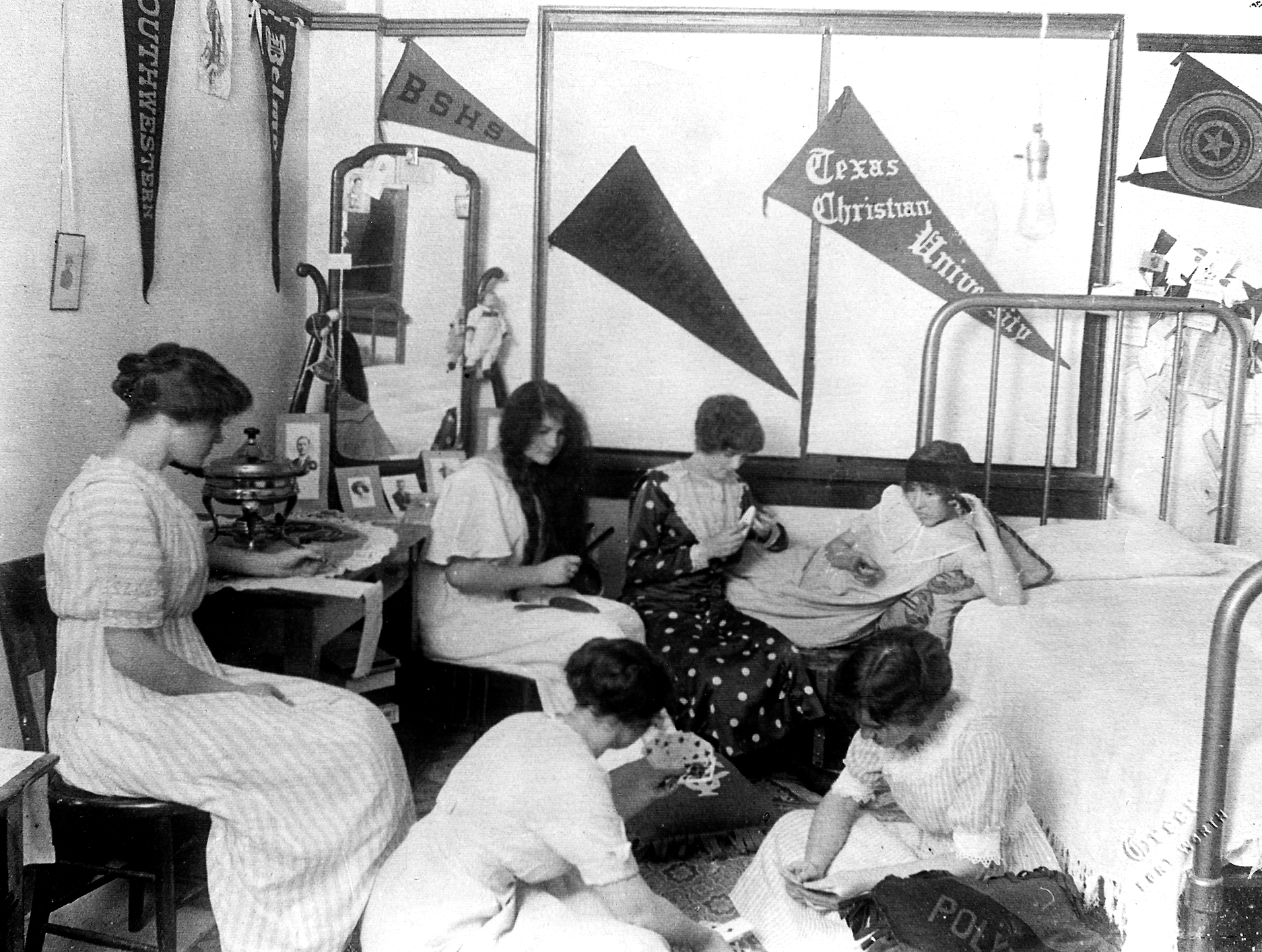
Female students in a dorm room at Jarvis Hall

=== Student body ===
Student body composition as of May 2, 2022
Race and ethnicity	Total
White	68%
Hispanic	16%
Black	5%
Foreign national	4%
Other (Note: Other consists of multiracial Americans and those who prefer to not say.)	4%
Asian	3%
Economic diversity
Low-income (Note: The percentage of students who received an income-based federal Pell grant intended for low-income students.)	12%
Affluent (Note: The percentage of students who are a part of the American middle class at the bare minimum.)	88%

The student population at TCU in 2024–2025 was 12,938, with 11,049 undergraduates and 1,889 graduate students. Women made up about 61% of the student population, while men made up about 39%. Undergraduates matriculate from all fifty states, including Texas at 48%. The fields of nursing, education, and advertising-public relations tend to be the majors that attract the most women, while business, political science, and a host of liberal arts majors are more balanced. A few areas of study at TCU, such as engineering and the sciences, are typically disproportionate with men, though even in those areas the percentage of female students tends to be higher than those of other comparable universities.

The student and faculty populations are overwhelmingly non-Hispanic white, but the minority population has seen increased rates over the past few years, especially for Hispanics. The school has also tried to achieve stronger diversity by hosting "Black Senior Weekend", "Hispanic Senior Experience", and offering full scholarships to a select number of exceptional minority high school students in North Texas with economically disadvantaged backgrounds.

=== Student organizations and events ===
TCU sponsors over 200 official student organizations including Amnesty International, Habitat for Humanity, Invisible Children and others. Students may also compete in intramural sports including basketball and shuffleboard, or join various other sport-hobby groups, such as the TCU Quidditch League.

Many students involve themselves in various campus ministries, such as Disciples on Campus, a Christian Church (Disciples of Christ) student group. Other groups include Ignite, a nondenominational campus ministry; Catholic Community, a large and active group; TCU Wesley, a Methodist group; the Latter-Day Saint Student Association (LDSSA); and Cru, a nondenominational evangelical student ministry. Most religious groups on campus are Christian-based, although TCU also sponsors Hillel, a Jewish student group, and the Muslim Students Association (MSA). Additionally, each year TCU Housing and Residential Life allows students to apply to live in the Interfaith Living Learning Community (LLC), in which the residents spend the year living alongside neighbors of various religious beliefs.

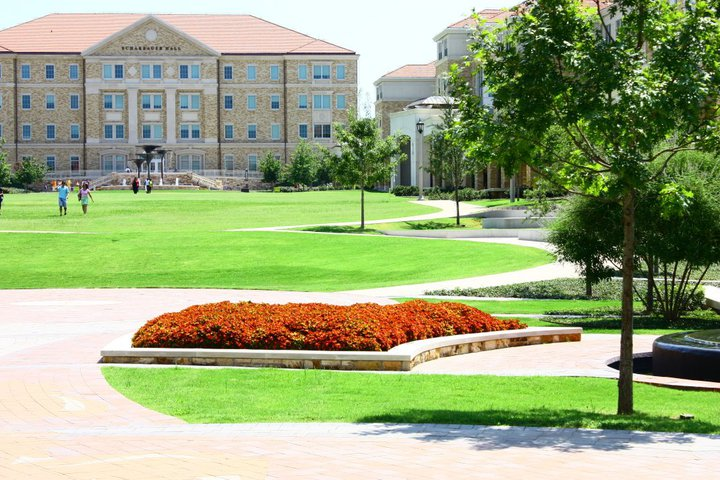
TCU Commons

At the beginning of each fall semester, TCU's student government holds a large concert on the Campus Commons. In 2008, TCU celebrated completion of the Brown-Lupton Union by hosting popular country artist Pat Green. In Fall of 2009, it held a concert by OneRepublic following a football victory over Texas State. Lady Antebellum performed in 2010, and The Fray in 2011. Blake Shelton performed in 2012, Little Big Town in 2013 and Jason Derulo performed in the campus commons in 2014. These fall concerts are free to all students.

=== Student media ===
The Bob Schieffer College of Communication circulates a number of student-run publications:

- The Skiff, a weekly print newspaper, began publication in 1902 and is one of the oldest continuously printing newspapers in Tarrant County.
- TCU360.com is the student-led, faculty-advised news website of TCU Student Media.
- Image Magazine, TCU's student magazine, published once a semester and focuses on investigative, in-depth campus issues
- TCU broadcasts its own radio station, KTCU-FM 88.7, "The Choice." KTCU can be heard throughout much of Fort Worth/Dallas, and offers programming which includes music, talk, and live broadcasts Horned Frog football, basketball, and baseball games.

Other student-run media include:

- eleven40seven, a literary magazine
- The Horned Frog, the school yearbook since 1897

=== Greek life ===
Approximately 50% of undergraduate students are active in TCU's Greek system: There are dozens of fraternities and sororities on campus.

=== Sustainability ===
A "Purple Bike" program was instituted to allow students to use purple bicycles free of charge as an alternative to motor vehicles. Scharbauer Hall, which opened for classes in 2010, is a Gold US Green Building Council's Leadership in Energy and Environmental Design (LEED) certified facility.

In 2010 TCU faculty and staff held a conference for Service-Learning for Sustainability and Social Justice with keynote speaker Robert Egger, founder of D.C. Central Kitchen. Also, sustainability and social justice are emphasized areas in the curriculum and programs offered by the Department of Sociology and Anthropology located in Scharbauer Hall.

== Athletics ==
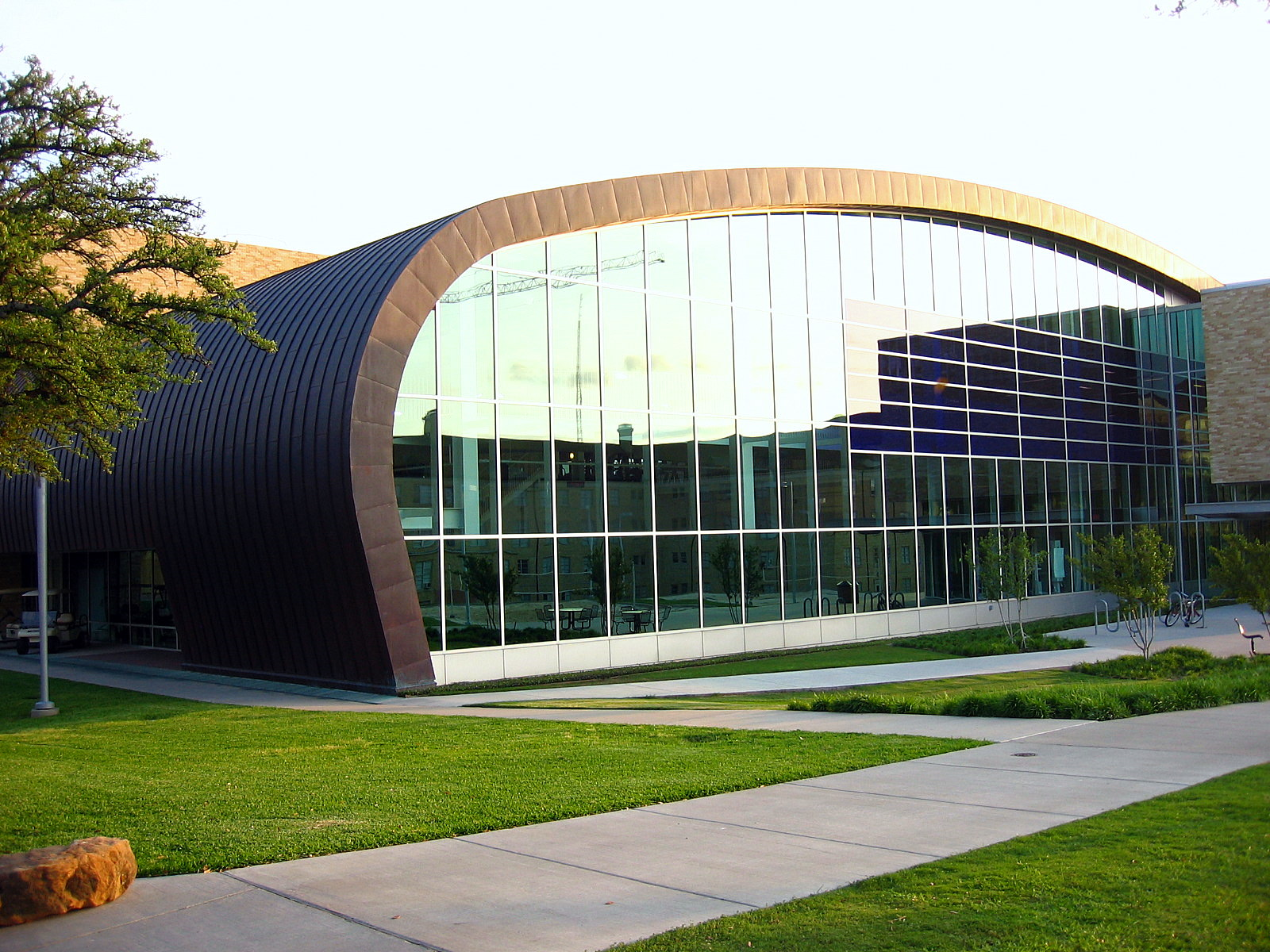
Recreation Center

TCU competes in NCAA Division I athletics as a member of the Big 12 Conference (Big XII). For most of its history (1923–1996), TCU was a member of the now defunct Southwest Conference (SWC). Prior to joining the Big XII in 2012, TCU spent seven years in the Mountain West Conference (MWC) (2005–2011), where they were the only school to join from a conference other than the Western Athletic Conference (WAC), having come from Conference USA (C-USA), of which they were a member from 2001 to 2005. Before joining C-USA, TCU teams competed in the WAC for five years, from 1996 to 2001, after the SWC dissolved.

TCU's varsity sports have eight men's and twelve women's squads. Men's sports include baseball, basketball, football, golf, swimming and diving, track and field, cross country, and tennis. Women's sports include basketball, volleyball, beach volleyball, golf, swimming and diving, cross country, track and field, triathlon, soccer, rifle, equestrian, and tennis.

In recent years the university has made significant upgrades to its athletics facilities, including construction of the Abe-Martin Academic Enhancement Center, which was completed in August 2008. The university finished reconstruction of the entire Amon G. Carter Football Stadium in September 2012, with an additional expansion on the east side of the stadium being completed in 2019. The Daniel-Meyer Coliseum underwent a reconstruction and was completed as Ed and Rae Schollmaier Arena for the 2015–16 basketball season, with expanded seating, concessions, office and locker room space, better sight lines, and luxury fan facilities.

=== Football ===
The Horned Frogs have won two national championships, one in 1935 and the other in 1938. The Horned Frogs also competed in the 2023 College Football Playoff National Championship game, losing 65-7 to the Georgia Bulldogs. Additionally, the team has captured eighteen conference championships. Many notable football players have played for TCU, including Sammy Baugh, Davey O'Brien, Jim Swink, Bob Lilly, LaDainian Tomlinson, and Andy Dalton.

=== Rivalries ===
The oldest rivalry, which has become nationally famous since TCU joined the Big 12 Conference, is The Revivalry with Baylor University. The Revivalry is unique in that it is a major FBS rivalry between two church affiliated schools. It is also one of the oldest rivalries in the nation, with the series currently led by TCU 59-54-7 since 1899.

The TCU Horned Frogs also share a historic rivalry with the Southern Methodist University Mustangs, located in Fort Worth's sister (and rival) city, Dallas. In football, teams from TCU and SMU have competed annually in the Battle for the Iron Skillet since 1946 when, during pre-game festivities, an SMU fan was frying frog legs as a joke before the game. A TCU fan, seeing this as a desecration of their "Horned Frog", told him that eating the frog legs was going well beyond the rivalry and that they should let the game decide who would get the skillet and the frog legs. SMU won the game, and the skillet and frog legs went to SMU that year. The tradition spilled over into the actual game and the Iron Skillet is now passed to the winner as the rivalry's traveling trophy.

== Notable faculty ==
- Richard J. Allen, writer
- Stanley Block, emeritus professor of Finance
- Teresa Abi-Nader Dahlberg, academic administrator and engineering professor
- Freeman Dyson, Cecil H. and Ida Green Honors Chair professor
- Lydia Mackay, professor of theater; voice and stage actress
- Efstathios E. Michaelides, engineering professor
- David Moessner, A A. Bradford Chair and professor of religion
- Susan E. Ramírez, Neville G. Penrose chair emeritus of history and Latin American studies
- Lois Rhea, composer, organist and music educator
- Gene A. Smith, historian
- Steven E. Woodworth, Civil War historian

== Alumni ==
TCU has more than 100,000 living alumni.
