= Addison Clark =

American university president

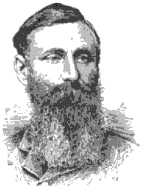
- Born: December 11, 1842; Red River County, Republic of Texas (Note: (today Titus County, Texas, US))
- Died: May 1911 (aged 68); Comanche, Texas, US
- Occupation: Educator

Addison Clark (1842–1911) was a co-founder and the first president of Texas Christian University (TCU).

== Biography ==
Addison Clark was born in Titus County, Texas (then part of Red River County) on December 11, 1842.

He served in the Confederate Army during the American Civil War.

In 1873, he and his brother Randolph founded Add-Ran Male & Female College in Thorp Spring, Texas, and he served as its first president. The school was later renamed Texas Christian University.

Addison Clark died at his daughter's home in Comanche, Texas in May 1911.
