= United Public Workers of America =

Former trade union of the United States

- Founded: May 1946
- Dissolved: February 1953
- Headquarters: 13 Astor Place, New York City, New York
- Location: United States
- Members: 100,000 in 1946 (claimed; at its height)
- Key people: Abram Flaxer
- Affiliations: Congress of Industrial Organizations (until February 1950); None (February 1950 – February 1953)

The United Public Workers of America (1946–1952) was an American labor union representing federal, state, county, and local government employees. The union challenged the constitutionality of the Hatch Act of 1939, which prohibited federal executive branch employees from engaging in politics. In United Public Workers of America v. Mitchell, 330 U.S. 75 (1947), the Supreme Court of the United States upheld the Hatch Act, finding that its infringement on the Constitutional rights was outweighed by the need to end political corruption. The union's leadership was Communist, and in a famous purge the union was ejected from its parent trade union federation, the Congress of Industrial Organizations, in 1950.

The union is sometimes confused with the United Federal Workers of America (a predecessor union) and the United Office and Professional Workers of America (UOPWA) (a union of white-collar, private-sector office workers which also belonged to the Congress of Industrial Organizations).

== Status of unions in the U.S. federal government ==
Workers in federal agencies had formed craft-based unions on the local level beginning in the early 1880s. The growing power of these and other unions in the federal government led President Theodore Roosevelt to issue two Executive Orders (in 1902 and 1906) essentially banning unions in the federal civil service. Under Congressional pressure, President William H. Taft made the Executive Orders less onerous in 1912. Unhappy with Taft's refusal to rescind the orders entirely, Congress passed the Lloyd-La Follette Act (§6, 37 Stat. 555, 5 U.S.C. § 7511) on August 24, 1912, declaring establishing the right of federal employees to join unions (albeit not the right for them to bargain collectively). Five years later, the American Federation of Labor (AFL) acted to bring the various local unions together to form a single national union, the National Federation of Federal Employees, in September 1917.

In December 1931, NFFE disaffiliated from the AFL, its national trade union center. The break occurred over the AFL's refusal to abandon its support for craft unionism and cease its attacks on industrial unions. The AFL responded by chartering a new federal employees union, the American Federation of Government Employees (AFGE), in October 1932 from several units of the NFFE which did not wish to leave the labor federation.

In 1936, the AFL chartered the American Federation of State, County and Municipal Employees (AFSCME) to represent non-federal government workers in the United States.

In the early 1930s, a fundamental dispute occurred within the U.S. labor movement over whether to organize workers by craft or on an industry-wide basis. After a contentious AFL convention in October 1935 (during which union leaders came to blows), eight unions engaged in industrial union organizing formed the Committee for Industrial Organizing. The AFL accused them of engaging in dual unionism, and on September 10, 1936, suspended them from the national labor federation. Efforts to reunify the two groups failed, and the Committee reconstituted itself as the Congress of Industrial Organizations (CIO) on November 9, 1936. The CIO quickly began forming unions to compete with their counterpart unions in the AFL.

=== The UFWA and SCMWA ===
In 1937, a number of AFSCME local unions, composed primarily of caseworkers, disaffiliated from that union and joined the CIO. The CIO allowed these local unions to form the State, County, and Municipal Workers of America (SCMWA), and charged the new organization with competing with AFSCME at the state and local levels for membership. Most of the leaders and many of the members of these local unions were strongly sympathetic to the beliefs and goals of the Communist Party USA. Former AFSCME executive board member Abram Flaxer was appointed the new union's president, and former AFSCME Secretary-Treasurer David Kanes held the same post in SCMWA. SCMWA membership grew quickly: It more than doubled the number of local unions (from 12 to 28) in a year, and its members rose from 25,000 in 1937 to more than 48,000 in 1946. In comparison, AFSCME's membership grew from 13,259 in 1947 to more than 73,000 in 1946.

In 1937, the CIO formed a new union for U.S. government employees, the United Federal Workers of America (UFWA), from elements of the AFGE. The UFWA's membership, however, remained static (as did the membership of nearly all federal government unions in the 1930s). Like SCMWA, the UFWA leadership was leftist. The leadership was militant in its advocacy of the rights of its members and most of the national and local union leadership advocated leftist ideals; associated with left-wing intellectuals, activists, and political people; and supported left-wing organizations. This led many politicians and others to believe the organization was Communist-controlled.

The political leanings of the UWFA led to passage of two pieces of legislation intended to restrict its political activities. In June 1938, Congress passed a rider to appropriations legislation with prevented the federal government from making payments (such as salaries) to any person or organization which advocated the overthrow of the federal government (as many communist organizations at the time proposed). In 1939, Congress passed the Hatch Act of 1939, which restricted political campaign activities by federal employees. A provision of the Hatch Act made it illegal for the federal government to employ anyone who advocated the overthrow of the federal government. The UFWA immediately hired lawyer Lee Pressman to challenge the constitutionality of the Hatch Act.

== Formation of the UPWA and its CIO history ==
On April 25, 1946, SCMWA merged with the UFWA to form the United Public Workers of America. Joining the new organization were several local unions which had been expelled from the American Federation of Teachers (AFT) for being communist-dominated. The impetus for the merger was the relative failure of the UFWA to attract new members, and SCMWA essentially absorbed the smaller federal union. The new union said its mission was to organize new members as well as raid the AFGE (the AFL affiliate) and the NFFE (now independent) for members. With a membership of more than 100,000 (out of six million public-sector workers at all levels nationwide), UPWA claimed to be the largest public employee union in the nation. About 7,000 of UPWA's members were welfare caseworkers. while the rest worked in private nonprofit hospitals, public utilities (such as water companies), and local government. The hospital workers numbered in the several thousand, and were primarily located in New York City. The union hired Elliot Godoff as a hospital organizer; after the collapse of UPWA, Godoff became a key organizer and leader for Local 1199 of the Drug, Hospital, and Health Care Employees Union.

The new union's president was Abram Flaxer, and its secretary-treasurer was Panamanian immigrant and scholar Ewart Guinier. The new union also began publishing a 16-page, tabloid-sized membership magazine, The Public Record. The UPWA formed a teachers division, and affiliated several local teachers unions which had been expelled from the American Federation of Teachers during an anti-communist purge in 1941. Among these were the Los Angeles Federation of Teachers, Local 430; the Philadelphia Teachers Union, Local 192; New York City Teachers Union, Local 5 (then the largest local union in the AFT); New York City College Teachers, Local 537; University of Washington, Local 401 (expelled in 1948, not 1941). Its teacher organizing efforts were particularly strong in New York City.

The union adopted a number of policies early on which were, at the time, considered militant and/or leftist (even communist). Although initially the union had a no-strike policy, it soon rescinded this in favor of the right of public employees to walk off the job. It proposed a collective bargaining law for federal public employees modeled on the National Labor Relations Act, and in 1949 began supporting legislation (the Rhodes-Johnston bill) which would implement such a system. Founded at the end of World War II, the union promoted policies designed to minimize the impact of economic conversion on women, African Americans, and other minorities. It also adopted a resolution applauding the foreign policy of the Soviet Union, which nearly led to an investigation of the union by the Civil Service Commission. These won the union significant support from leftists in the entertainment industry. Actor and singer Paul Robeson and classical pianist Ray Lev both played concerts which benefitted the union, and novelists Dashiell Hammett, Howard Fast, and others spoke at union rallies about being persecuted for their leftist political beliefs. The union, in turn, helped its allies. Secretary-Treasurer Ewart Guinier managed Henry A. Wallace's 1948 presidential campaign in New York City.

In the two years immediately following World War II, the UPWA threatened repeatedly to have its federal workers strike. A fearful Congress passed legislation in 1946 depriving federal workers of their salaries if they belonged to any union which advocated the right of federal workers to strike, and which required them to sign affidavits that they did not belong to any union which did. In 1947, Congress passed the Taft-Hartley Act, which made it illegal for federal employees to strike and penalized them with immediate dismissal. A third federal law, passed in 1955, made it illegal for federal workers to strike, advocate the right to strike, or belong to any organization which advocated the right for them to strike.

Congress repeatedly investigated the union for violations of the Hatch Act and prohibitions on advocacy of the right to strike. In January 1947, the House of Representatives Committee on Campaign Expenditures reported that it had found evidence that the UPWA (and other unions) had violated the Federal Corrupt Practices Act by failing to report expenditures in support of various political parties and candidates for federal office.

=== Opposition to racism ===
The UPWA also adopted policies and engaged in activities to oppose racism. Unlike many unions of the era, the UPWA insisted that white and African American employees receive the same wages, benefits, and workplace rights. The union's racial integration policies were among the strongest of any American union of the day. and the UPWA was the most integrated CIO union (by race and gender). The union's anti-discrimination efforts were a key part of its new member organizing strategy, and in time almost a third of the union's members were African American. The union also focused on organizing worksites which employed large numbers of black workers. In June 1947, it organized the faculty and services workers at Howard University, a historically black college. The first African American woman to lead a union in New York state was UPWA's Eleanor Godling (who also served on executive board of the New York State CIO). The UPWA made the federal government a primary target for its equality in employment efforts. In early 1947, UPWA accused nine federal agencies and the International Bank for Reconstruction and Development of blatantly refusing to hire African Americans. The Veterans' Administration and State Department were the agencies most resistant to the UPWA on racial issues. UPWA was also the only union to make a significant effort at integrating the United States Post Office Department. In August 1949, UPWA members (accompanied by actor and singer Paul Robeson) picketed the White House to protest racially discriminatory hiring and employment practices and the Bureau of Engraving and Printing.

The union also played a significant role within the CIO in lobbying for the strengthening of the Fair Employment Practices Commission, a federal agency established in 1941 to ensure that companies with government contracts did not discriminate on the basis of race or religion. When the FEPC was in danger of losing much of its power and being dismantled, UPWA introduced a successful resolution at the 1949 NAACP convention to hold an FEPC National Emergency Mobilization to push for legislation that would make the FEPC permanent. But the advent of the Korean War led to the defeat of legislation. These policies were not accepted by all UWPA locals, however. Ten UPWA locals disaffiliated partly because of the parent union's stand on racial equality.

In one case, a UPWA effort on behalf of black workers led to important political change. In 1947, the UPWA engaged in a campaign to save 2,200 African American jobs at a Bureau of Internal Revenue processing center in the Bronx in New York City. Ernest Campbell, an agency official, believed that the percentage of black employees among the workers should be the same as the percentage of blacks in the general population, and began an active campaign to fire African American workers (who constituted a majority of employees at the center) until this lower percentage was reached. The UPWA quickly formed a "black popular front" known as the Citizens Committee for the Job Security of Bronx Internal Revenue Employees to protest Campbell's actions. The movement was successful: in the spring of 1947, the U.S. Civil Service Commissioner ruled that Campbell's actions were illegal. Campbell managed to fire the black workers anyway by moving the processing center to Kansas City. The Bronx fight garnered national headlines, and UPWA vice president Thomas Richardson testified in mid-1947 before the President's Committee on Civil Rights in reference to Bronx case. This and other testimony led to the adoption of a to civil rights plank in the political platform of the Democratic Party.

=== Panama Canal Zone union ===
One of the union's most significant and historically important organizing campaigns occurred in the Panama Canal Zone.

For decades, workers in the Canal Zone had been classified as high-skilled, long-seniority, high-wage "Gold" workers or low-skilled, low-seniority, low-wage "Silver" workers. In practice, "Gold" workers regardless of skill, seniority or wage were white and non-white native Panamanians and workers of African descent always classified as "Silver" workers. Under this blatantly racist system, "Gold" workers received numerous privileges and rights (such as unrestricted access to the Canal Zone, and the right to shop at American-owned stores) that "Silver" workers did not, as well as much higher pay.

In 1939, the CIO began organizing "Silver" workers into a union, and established the Canal Zone Workers Organizing Committee. The UPWA sent several militant, leftist organizers to the area to assist with the organizing effort. In July 1946, the "Silver" workers formally established the Canal Zone Workers' Union, UPWA Local 713. Local 713 also incorporated elements of the old AFT Local 29 (a union of teachers chartered in 1918 that became inactive in the early 1920s). Within a year, Local 713 had nearly 16,000 members. In 1946, the House Un-American Activities Committee accused UPWA of conspiracy to sabotage U.S. military operations by organizing workers in the Panama Canal Zone. But Local 713 members said that if their union leaders or UPWA officials in the U.S. ordered them to do anything which would harm the Canal Zone, they would refuse. The union began holding large rallies to encourage organizing and win improvements to working conditions. Several thousand people attended a rally in January 1947. Paul Robeson traveled to Panama on May 25, 1947, to perform four concerts to support UPWA Local 713. One concert attracted 10,000 people; another was attended by the President of Panama, Enrique Adolfo Jiménez. By June 1947, Local 713 had won wage and overtime pay improvements, more vacation time, equal admission to civil service exams for non-whites, and removal of signs barring "Silver" workers from "Gold" facilities.

The Panama Canal Company, the private company which ran Canal operations (whose president was also Governor of the Panama Canal Zone and the head of the U.S. territorial government), began a campaign to have the UPWA ousted. Under pressure from the company, the government of Panama expelled UPWA regional director Max Brodsky in March 1949. Brodsky fled into the Canal Zone (then a U.S. territory, and not part of the nation of Panama), but the Governor of the Canal Zone ordered him deported from there as well. Brodsky returned to the U.S., and the Panama Canal Company successfully had the UPWA ousted as the representative of Local 713 in 1950.

=== Loyalty oath issue and court case ===
UPWA also mounted the only organized opposition to President Harry S. Truman's loyalty oath program. President Truman was deeply concerned about the rising tide of anti-communist feeling in the United States. Seeking to cut off what he saw as impending hysteria, he established the Temporary Committee on Employee Loyalty in 1946 to investigate allegations of communist political views among federal employees (and fire those found to be insufficiently patriotic, democratic, and capitalist), and in February 1947 announced the Truman Doctrine (under which the U.S. would support democratic regimes facing armed insurrection or interference in their political processes by outside parties). On March 21, 1947, Truman issued Executive Order 9835, which barred members of the Communist Party or anyone in "sympathetic association" with it from federal employment, required all federal employees to sign affidavits that affirmed they were not communists and did not seek the overthrow of the U.S. government, and authorized the Federal Bureau of Investigation and the Civil Service Commission to investigate allegations of disloyalty. The UPWA had continued to criticize the Hatch Act, the purpose of which (it felt) was to repress leftists rather than clean up the civil service (a purpose the head of the U.S. Civil Service Commission confirmed). The loyalty oaths were particularly vexing for the UPWA because only the most left-wing unions and organizations tended to support collective bargaining and the right to strike for public employees, and to strongly oppose racism in public employment. It was common for anyone who demanded equal rights for blacks and other minorities to be branded disloyal. On November 24, 1948, Flaxer sent a letter to Truman decrying the tendency to brand a person disloyal simply because they advocated for improvements in civil rights.

As the loyalty oath issue came to the fore, the UPWA's long-standing lawsuit (initiated by Lee Pressman under the auspices of the old UFWA) finally reached the Supreme Court. In the 19th century, American courts had established the doctrine of privilege. This legal doctrine concluded that public employment was a privilege, not a right, and subsequently significant restrictions could be placed on public employees that could not be constitutionally tolerated in the private sector. By the middle of the 20th century, however, the doctrine of privilege had been markedly weakened. Abuse of the privilege had led to widespread corruption; the tolerance of sexual harassment, racism, religious discrimination, and gender discrimination; and workplace abuse (such as forcing employees to buy goods and services from a supervisor, or forcing employees to run errands for the supervisor). The courts were becoming less and less tolerant of the doctrine of privilege. But in United Public Workers v. Mitchell, the Supreme Court upheld the doctrine of privilege. Writing for the majority, Associate Justice Stanley Forman Reed argued that the Hatch Act did not infringe on the First Amendment guarantees of free speech and free association but rather on rights guaranteed by the Ninth Amendment (guaranteeing non-enumerated rights to the people) and Tenth Amendment (guaranteeing non-enumerated rights to the states). These rights were not absolute, and could be subordinated to the "elemental need for order" without which all rights ceased to function. Additionally, the non-enumerated rights of the Ninth and Tenth Amendments were subordinate to the enumerated rights granted to the federal government by the Constitution. Reed upheld the Hatch Act as a legitimate exercise of the enumerated rights of the federal government. United Public Workers v. Mitchell was the last gasp of the doctrine of privilege. The Supreme Court openly rejected the doctrine in Wieman v. Updegraff, and a wide number of high court decisions in areas such as nonpartisan speech, due process, search and seizure, the right to marry, the right to bear children, equal protection, education, and receipt of public benefits over the next two decades continued to undermine the doctrine. Although the Supreme Court later reaffirmed Mitchell in 1973 in Civil Service Comm'n v. Letter Carriers, it did so on the grounds that permitting public employees to engage in political activity was dangerous.

=== Expulsion from the CIO ===
In 1946, the Congress of Industrial Organizations began a push to purge communists from the ranks of its membership and leadership. In part, the CIO was reacting to and even part of the growing national hysteria over communism that swept the nation from 1946 until the late 1950s. In 1947, Congress had overridden President Truman's veto of the Taft-Hartley Act, which, among other things, required union leaders to sign a non-communist affidavit. But by one estimate, half the CIO unions were communist-controlled, and the press reported that a third of the delegates at the CIO convention were communists or controlled by communist organizations. Although CIO President Philip Murray had tolerated communist influence in the CIO and its unions, many influential leaders in the labor federation did not. Among these were Walter Reuther, the newly elected head of the United Auto Workers, who had achieved a razor-thin victory over incumbent president R. J. Thomas by building an anti-communist coalition within the union. The AFL, which had largely abandoned craft unionism since 1935, was growing quickly and using the presence of large numbers of communists in the CIO as a way of turning workers away from the CIO. But, in part, the CIO was reacting to a change in foreign policy. The CIO had initially favored U.S.-Soviet cooperation in the post-war period (which communists within the CIO highly approved of), but the increasingly anti-Soviet foreign policies of the Truman administration left much of the CIO leadership advocating a break with this policy. This brought the anti-communist and communist factions within the CIO into conflict. The issue was exacerbated in late 1947 when the newly formed Cominform (the international Communist Party organization) strongly denounced the United States and directed communists in the West to abandon liberal and socialist political parties and form new, communist third parties. This policy directly conflicted with CIO support for the Democratic Party.

There were serious signs of discontent with the UPWA's political views as early as 1946. The CIO executive board had already adopted new rules in November 1946 that prohibited CIO unions from "adopting an outside party's line". In late 1946, UPWA local unions of federal postal workers in Chicago, Detroit, Duluth, and Pittsburgh disaffiliated, unhappy about the parent union's left-wing political positions.

During the January 1948 CIO executive board meeting, anti-communist union leaders argued bitterly and contentiously with left-wing union presidents about the nature and extent of Communist Party influence in the left-wing unions, and the conflict was exacerbated after the communist-influenced unions began backing the third-party presidential candidacy of Henry A. Wallace. In May 1948, an "anti-communist faction" within the UPWA announced it would leave to set up a new Government workers union within the CIO; it claimed to speak for 10,000 Federal, state, and municipal members. The leaders of this faction were Morton Liftin, then a Justice Department attorney, and William Mirengoff, then a Labor Department economist. They were negotiating with the Industrial Union of Marine and Shipbuilding Workers Union and the Utility Workers Union, both "vehemently anti-Communist."

The most serious attacks on the UPWA began in 1949, however. The UPWA was censured by the CIO executive board in May 1949 for violating the 1946 prohibitions on parroting the communist political line. CIO President Philip Murray began to vocally attack the communist-influenced CIO unions throughout the rest of 1949. He also blasted the UPWA's weak organizing efforts (the UPWA had about 82,000 members in August 1949). The UPWA countered in August that Murray and the CIO were committing fratricide and that his charges of undue influence were untrue. For a brief time in August the UPWA considered disaffiliating from the CIO because of these attacks, but did not. The CIO meanwhile, quietly established a new union—the Government and Civic Employees Organizing Committee (GCEOC)—to compete with the UPWA, and began organizing workers in the UPWA's stronghold in New York City.

The attack on the UPWA culminated at the CIO's November 1949 convention. The CIO passed resolutions barring members of the Communist Party from holding leadership positions in the labor federation, and barred its member unions from being controlled by the Communist Party or from adhering to the Party's program at the expense of the CIO. CIO convention delegates then charged 10 unions, the UPWA among them, of being communist-controlled.

A committee of anti-communist CIO vice presidents, chaired by Textile Workers Union of America President Emil Rieve, was established to try the union and (individually) Abram Flaxer on the charges. The UPWA immediately ceased paying its member dues to the CIO, and denounced the committee as biased due to the strong anti-communist feelings of its members. As the trial approached in January 1950, the UPWA issued a lengthy document which purported to show that it had not parroted the Communist Party line and had upheld the CIO political platform. When the informal trial opened on January 9, the UPWA attempted to bring more than 250 witnesses in its defense, but the crowd was barred on the grounds it would intimidate the committee. At the hearing, Transport Workers Union of America President and communist Mike Quill (who had broken with the Communist Party USA some years earlier but not abandoned his communist beliefs), testified that Flaxer had coordinated his organizing efforts and criticism of the CIO with CPUSA leaders.

The CIO executive board on February 16, 1950, voted 34-to-2 to expel the UPWA.

== Post-CIO history and dissolution ==
Within months after the expulsion from the CIO, the UPWA began to disintegrate. The Veterans' Administration and State Department both withdrew recognition of UPWA locals immediately. Secretary of State Dean Acheson threatened to fire anyone in his department who retained membership in UPWA. Mayor of New York City William O'Dwyer refused to recognize any of the union's locals in New York City, and the city formally refused to bargain with the union in October 1951. Nine days after UPWA's expulsion, the CIO announced that the GCEOC would immediately begin raiding UPWA locals and organizing new members on the state and local level. The GCEOC's new member organizing failed conspicuously, but the AFL and CIO both heavily raided the UPWA's locals. By May 1950, the union had shed 22,000 members. The UPWA executive board sponsored a union-wide vote of confidence in Flaxer in May 1950, who easily secured a large majority. The UPWA considered forming a new national labor federation with the other expelled CIO unions in November 1950, but this effort never coalesced. The CIO announced the formation of a national teachers' union in September 1952 to compete with the UPWA in that jurisdiction. causing the Teachers Guild (one of UPWA's largest and most active locals) to disaffiliate and become independent in February 1953.

Flaxer personally faced additional legal trouble. Testifying before a one-man subcommittee of the House Un-American Activities Committee in 1952, he refused to turn over the union's membership lists to Congress. He was cited for contempt of Congress in March 1952, and formally indicted four months later. A court overturned the indictment in November 1952, and was re-indicted three days later. He was convicted in March 1953 and ordered to serve two months in jail and pay a $1,000 fine. He appealed his conviction, but the appeal was denied.

The UPWA was dissolved in February 1953. In 1955, the AFL and CIO merged to form the AFL–CIO. The policy of the new union was to promote the merger of AFL and CIO counterpart unions. Subsequently, the GCEOC (with 30,000 members) merged with AFSCME in 1956. A few former UPWA social worker in New York City left AFSCME and formed the Social Service Employees Union in 1961. SSEU joined AFSCME in 1969.

== Notable members ==
A number of notable people belonged to or worked from the United Public Workers of America during the union's short life. Among these individuals were:

- Alfred Bernstein was director of negotiations for the UPWA from 1946 to 1952. He later represented hundreds of government employees before loyalty-oath committees. Bernstein had previously been a high-ranking official in the Office of Price Administration during World War II. From 1942 to 1947 he was a member of the Communist Party, and between 1947 and 1951 he was forced to testify five times before Congressional committees about his Party activities. Alfred Bernstein is the father of the former Washington Post journalist Carl Bernstein.
- Ewart Guinier was Secretary-Treasurer of the UPWA during its existence. Guinier later earned a master's degree in history and a J.D., and became the first chair of the Department of Afro-American Studies at Harvard University. He was the father of lawyer, civil rights activist, and Harvard law professor Lani Guinier.
- John Oliver Killens, an African American organizer for the UPWA and business agent for Local 10 in Washington, D.C. Killens would become a noted fiction writer and twice be nominated for the Pulitzer Prize.
- Arthur Stein had helped co-found the United Federal Workers of American (one of the UPWA's two predecessor unions), was elected president of its Works Progress Administration local, and later worked as a full-time organizer for the UPWA. He also knew Alfred Bernstein. He had joined the Communist Party some time in the late 1920s or early 1930s, and co-organized the 1932 Chicago Counter-Olympics (also known as the International Workers Athletic Meet, the first Olympic counter-protest). He later was an employee at the Works Progress Administration and then the War Production Board. In 1937, he helped Herbert Fuchs organize a secret cell of the Party within a subcommittee of the Senate Committee on Interstate and Foreign Commerce, and later at the National Labor Relations Board (where Fuchs had taken a job). His daughter, Eleanor Stein, would marry (taking her husband's last name, Raskin), divorce, join the Students for a Democratic Society, and become a leader in the Weather Underground domestic terrorist group. Eleanor would marry fellow Weatherman Jeff Jones in 1981. Their son, Thai Jones (born in 1977), is a nationally known journalist. In 2004, Thai Jones published a history of his family's leftist political involvement, A Radical Line: From the Labor Movement to the Weather Underground, One Family's Century of Conscience.

== See also ==
- United Federal Workers of America
- State, County, and Municipal Workers of America
- National Federation of Federal Employees
- American Federation of Government Employees

== Bibliography ==
- Arnesen, Eric. "United Federal Workers of America/United Public Workers of America." In Encyclopedia of U.S. Labor and Working-Class History. New York: Routledge, 2006.
- Beezley, William H. The Guman Tradition in Latin America: The 20th Century. Wilmington, Del.: Scholarly Resources, 1987.
- Bernstein, Carl. Loyalties. New York: Simon & Schuster, 1989.
- Billings, Richard N. and Greenya, John. Power to the Public Worker. Washington, D.C.: R.B. Luce, 1974.
- Biondi, Martha. To Stand and Fight: The Struggle for Civil Rights in Postwar New York City. Cambridge, Mass.: Harvard University Press, 2006.
- Boyer, Paul S. Boyer; Clark, Clifford; Kett, Joseph F.; Salisbury, Neal; and Sitkoff, Harvard. The Enduring Vision: A History of the American People. Boston: Houghton Mifflin, 2008.
- "Brodsky Ouster Fought." United Press International. March 17, 1949.
- "Charge of Committing 'Fratricidal Suicide' Is Hurled at CIO by Public Workers Union." New York Times. September 30, 1949.
- "C.I.O. Bars Crowd at Trial of Union." New York Times. January 10, 1950.
- "C.I.O. Expels Union of Public Workers." New York Times. February 17, 1950.
- "CIO Is Uniting Welfare Workers to Supplant Own Left-Wing Union." New York Times. September 3, 1949.
- "C.I.O. Teacher Drive Hit." New York Times. September 23, 1952.
- "C.I.O. to Recruit in Public Agencies." New York Times. February 26, 1950.
- Coleman, Charles J. Managing Labor Relations in the Public Sector. San Francisco: Jossey-Bass, 1990.
- "Contempt Appeal Lost." New York Times. June 22, 1956.
- "Contempt of Congress Denied." Associated Press. July 12, 1952.
- "Court Frees Flaxer in Contempt Charge." Associated Press. November 18, 1952.
- Dolgoff, Sam. Bakunin on Anarchism. Montréal: Black Rose Books, 2002.
- Dunn, Charles W. The Scarlet Thread of Scandal: Morality and the American Presidency. Lanham, Md: Rowman & Littlefield, 2001.
- DuPre, Flint. Your Career in Federal Civil Service. Paperback ed. New York: HarperCollins, 1981.
- Eaton, William Edward. The American Federation of Teachers, 1916–1961: A History of the Movement. Carbondale, Ill.: Southern Illinois University Press, 1975.
- "Ex-Union Head Loses 2d Contempt Appeal." New York Times. April 4, 1958.
- Faulkner, Harold Underwood. The Decline of Laissez Faire, 1897–1917. Armonk, N.Y.: M.E. Sharpe, 1951.
- Fink, Gary. Labor Unions. Westport, Conn: Greenwood Press, 1977.
- Fink, Leon and Greenberg, Brian. Upheaval in the Quiet Zone: A History of Hospital Workers' Union, Local 1199. Carbondale, Ill.: University of Illinois Press, 1989.
- "Flaxer Named Again on Contempt Charge." Associated Press. November 21, 1952.
- Fraser, C. Gerald. "Ewart Guinier, 79, Who Headed Afro-American Studies at Harvard." New York Times. February 7, 1990.
- Fraser, Nancy and Gordon, Linda. "A Genealogy of 'Dependency': Tracing a Keyword of the U.S. Welfare State." Signs. Winter 1994.
- Fried, Richard M. Nightmare in Red: The McCarthy Era in Perspective. New York: Oxford University Press, 1990.
- Friedman, Murray. Philadelphia Jewish life, 1940–2000. Philadelphia, Pa.: Temple University Press, 2003.
- Galenson, Walter. The CIO Challenge to the AFL: A History of the American Labor Movement. Cambridge, Mass.: Harvard University Press, 1960.
- Gall, Gilbert J. Pursuing Justice: Lee Pressman, the New Deal, and the CIO. Albany, N.Y.: State University of New York Press, 1999.
- Goldberg, Arthur J. AFL-CIO, Labor United. New York : McGraw-Hill, 1956.
- Goldberg, Chad Alan. Citizens and Paupers: Relief, Rights and Race, From the Freedmen's Bureau to Workfare. Chicago: University of Chicago Press, 2007.
- Goldstein, Robert Justin, Political Repression in Modern America (University of Illinois Press, 1978, 2001).
- Gross, James A. The Making of the National Labor Relations Board: A Study in Economics, Politics, and the Law. Albany, N.Y.: State University of New York Press, 1974.
- Halpern, Martin. Unions, Radicals, and Democratic Presidents: Seeking Social Change in the Twentieth Century. Westport, Conn.: Praeger, 2003.
- Hanlan, James P. and Weir, Robert E. Historical Encyclopedia of American Labor. Westport, Conn.: Greenwood, 2004.
- "Hatch Act 'Aimed At' Reds." New York Times. June 8, 1946.
- "Hold Canal Zone Protest." New York Times. January 20, 1947.
- Horowitz, Ruth L. Political Ideologies of Organized Labor. New Brunswick, N.J.: Transaction Books, 1977.
- Illson, Murray. "Ousted Unit Fights Teachers' Council." New York Times. August 23, 1949.
- Isaacson, Walter. "Books: My Father the Communist." Time. March 20, 1989.
- Jenkins, Philip. The Cold War At Home: The Red Scare in Pennsylvania, 1945–1960. Chapel Hill, N.C.: University of North Carolina Press, 1999.
- "John Oliver Killens." In Encyclopedia of Literature and Politics. Marvin Keith Booker, ed. Westport, Conn.: Greenwood Press, 2005.
- Joint Fact-Finding Committee on Un-American Activities. Senate. California Legislature. Ninth Report: Un-American Activities in California, 1952. Sacramento, Calif.: California State Printing Office, 1953.
- Jones, Thai. A Radical Line: From the Labor Movement to the Weather Underground, One Family's Century of Conscience. New York: The Free Press, 2004.
- Kahn, Marion Jacobs. Child of Madness. Minneapolis: Itasca Books, 2008.
- Klehr, Harvey. The Heyday of American Communism: The Depression Decade. New York: Basic Books, 1984.
- "Labor Study Bars Left-Wing Group." New York Times. October 30, 1951.
- Langer, Elinor. "The Left Side of Childhood." New York Times. March 5, 1989.
- Langston, Thomas S. The Cold War Presidency: A Documentary History. Washington, D.C.: CQ Press, 2007.
- Latham, Earl. The Communist Controversy in Washington: From the New Deal to McCarthy. New York: Atheneum, 1966.
- "Left-Wing Unions of Nation to Meet." New York Times. November 14, 1950.
- "Left-Wingers Face Trials By the CIO." New York Times. November 24, 1949.
- Levey, Stanley. "Left-Wing Group May Quit the CIO." New York Times. August 19, 1949.
- Lichtenstein, Nelson. Walter Reuther: The Most Dangerous Man in Detroit. Urbana, Ill.: University of Illinois Press, 1995.
- Loftus, Joseph A. "AFL Opens Parley; Green Assails CIO." New York Times. October 4, 1949.
- Loftus, Joseph A. "CIO Chiefs Censure Leftist Minority." New York Times. May 18, 1949.
- Loftus, Joseph A. "CIO Committee to Attempt Purge of Communist Ties." New York Times. November 16, 1946.
- Loftus, Joseph A. "Issue of Communism Is left Open By CIO." New York Times. November 24, 1946.
- Lowenberg, J. Joseph and Moskow, Michael H. Collective Bargaining in Government: Readings and Cases. Englewood Cliffs, N.J.: Prentice-Hall, 1972.
- Lyons, John F. Teachers and Reform: Chicago Public Education, 1929–1970. Urbana, Ill.: University of Illinois Press, 2008.
- Marshall, Ray. The Negro Worker. New York: Random House, 1967.
- Mayers, Lewis. The Federal Service: A Study of the System of Personnel Administration in the Federal Government. New York: D. Appleton and Co., 1922.
- McCartin, Joseph A. "Bringing the State's Workers In: Time to Rectify an Imbalanced U.S. Labor Historiography." Labor History. 47:1 (February 2006).
- McColloch, Mark. White Collar Workers in Transition: The Boom Years, 1940–1970. Westport, Conn.: Greenwood Press, 1983.
- Menez, Joseph Francis; Vile, John R.; and Bartholomew, Paul Charles. Summaries of Leading Cases on the Constitution. Lanham, Md.: Rowman & Littlefield, 2003.
- Moore, Wayne D. Constitutional Rights and Powers of the People. Princeton, N.J.: Princeton University Press, 1996.
- Morrison, Marjoie L. Handsaker. "Arbitration in Great Britain." Industrial Relations: A Journal of Economy and Society. 1961.
- Moskow, Michael H.; Loewenberg, J. Joseph; and Koziara, Edward Clifford. Collective Bargaining in Public Employment. New York, Random House, 1970.
- "Murray Cites 6 Units For Not Paying C.I.O." New York Times. December 17, 1949.
- "Must Waive Strike Right." New York Times. July 12, 1946.
- National Association of Social Workers. Social Work Year Book. New York: Russell Sage Foundation, 1939.
- "National Council for a Permanent FEPC." In Organizing Black America: An Encyclopedia of African American Associations. Nina Mjagkij, ed. New York: Routledge, 2001.
- "New Union Urges Wider Labor Law." New York Times. April 26, 1946.
- "O'Dwyer Shuns Union C.I.O. Ousted as Red." New York Times. March 11, 1950.
- O'Reggio, Trevor. Between Alienation and Citizenship: The Evolution of Black West Indian Society in Panama, 1914–1964. Lanham, Md.: University Press of America, 2006.
- "Office Union Loses Again." New York Times. February 21, 1950.
- Opdycke, Sandra. No One Was Turned Away: The Role of Public Hospitals in New York City Since 1900. New York: Oxford University Press, 2000.
- "Panama: Double Standard." Time. June 23, 1947.
- "Panama Expels Brodsky." United Press International. March 20, 1949.
- Phelan, Craig. William Green: Biography of a Labor Leader. Albany, N.Y.: State University of New York Press, 1989.
- Plummer, Brenda Gayle. Rising Wind: Black Americans and U.S. Foreign Affairs, 1935–1960. Chapel Hill, N.C.: University of North Carolina Press, 1996.
- Pope, Stephen W. The New American Sport History: Recent Approaches and Perspectives. Urbana, Ill.: University of Illinois Press, 1997.
- "Postal Union Quits UPW." New York Times. January 5, 1947.
- Rabin, Jack; Hildreth, W. Bartley; and Miller, Gerald J., eds. Handbook of Public Administration. 3d ed. Washington, D.C.: CRC Press, 2006.
- Raskin, A.H. "New Union Urges AFL Units Join CIO." New York Times. April 27, 1946.
- "Red Taint Charged in Welfare Union." New York Times. April 20, 1953.
- Reisch, Michael and Andrews, Janice. The Road Not Taken: A History of Radical Social Work in the United States. New York: Routledge, 2002.
- Repas, Robert F. Collective Bargaining in Federal Employment. Honolulu: University of Hawaii Industrial Relations Center, 1973.
- Robeson Jr., Paul. The Undiscovered Paul Robeson: Quest For Freedom, 1939–1976. Hoboken, N.J.: Wiley, 2010.
- Rosenbloom, David and O'Leary, Rosemary. Public Administration and Law. 2d ed. Washington, D.C.: CRC Press, 1996.
- Rubio, Philip F. There's Always Work at the Post Office: African American Postal Workers and the Fight for Jobs, Justice, and Equality. Chapel Hill, N.C.: University of North Carolina Press, 2010.
- Rung, Margaret. Servants of the State: Managing Diversity and Democracy in the Federal Workforce, 1933–1953. Athens, Ga.: University of Georgia Press, 2002.
- Selden, David. The Teacher Rebellion. Washington, D.C.: Howard University Press, 1985.
- Singer, Margaret Fuchs. Legacy of a False Promise: A Daughter's Reckoning. Tuscaloosa, Ala.: University of Alabama Press, 2009.
- Slater, Joseph E. Public Workers: Government Employee Unions, the Law, and the State, 1900–1962. Ithaca, N.Y.: ILR Press, 2004.
- Smith, Jessie Carney and Phelps, Shirelle. Notable Black American Women. Detroit: Gale Research, 2003.
- Spero, Sterling D. Government As Employer. New York: Remsen Press, 1948.
- Spero, Sterling D. and Blum, Albert A. Government As Employer. Carbondale, Ill.: Southern Illinois University Press, 1972.
- Stark, Louis. "Cries of Communism Stir Unions." New York Times. October 6, 1946.
- Stark, Louis. "Ouster of Leftists Is Pressed By C.I.O." New York Times. November 6, 1949.
- Stark, Louis. "Two Leftist Unions Expelled By C.I.O." New York Times. November 3, 1949.
- The Supreme Court of the United States: Hearings and Reports on Successful and Unsuccessful Nominations of Supreme Court Justices by the Senate Judiciary Committee, 1916–1972. Committee on the Judiciary. Senate. United States Congress. Buffalo: W.S. Hein, 1975.
- Taft, Philip. United They Teach: The Story of the United Federation of Teachers. Los Angeles: Nash Publishing, 1974.
- Taylor, Clarence and Galamison, Milton A. Knocking at Our Own Door: Milton A. Galamison and the Struggle to Integrate New York City Schools. Lanham, Md.: Lexington Books, 2001.
- "Teachers Union Quits Leftist Unit to Become an Unaffiliated Local." New York Times. February 14, 1953.
- "Ten Unions Accused Formally By C.I.O." New York Times. November 19, 1949.
- Thompson, Francis H. The Frustration of Politics: Truman, Congress and the Loyalty Issue, 1945–1953. Rutherford, N.J.: Dickinson, 1979.
- "Two CIO Unions Plan Fight." New York Times. September 7, 1949.
- "Union Accuses U.S. of Ban on Negroes." New York Times. January 11, 1947.
- "Union Facing Trial Accuses the C.I.O." New York Times. January 9, 1950.
- "Union Head Indicted." Associated Press. July 9, 1952.
- "Union Head Is Cited in Senate Contempt." United Press International. March 20, 1952.
- "Union Head Is Convicted of Contempt of Congress." United Press International. March 25, 1953.
- "Union Plans a Drive for Government Men." New York Times. May 31, 1950.
- "Unionist Gets Contempt Term." United Press International. October 17, 1953.
- "Unions Denounce C.I.O. Trial Board." New York Times. November 28, 1949.
- "University Staff in CIO." Associated Press. June 8, 1947.
- "U.S. 'Witch Hunt' Charged." New York Times. May 28, 1950.
- "Vote Aides Murray in Red-Ouster Plan." New York Times. November 1, 1949.
- "Voting Inquiry Hits 60 Unions, 11 Firms." New York Times. January 3, 1947.
- Wald, Alan M. Trinity of Passion: The Literary Left and the Antifascist Crusade. Chapel Hill, N.C.: University of North Carolina Press, 2007.
- "'Warfare' In CIO Is Hit." Associated Press. October 9, 1949.
- Weber, Clarence A. Personnel Problems of School Administrators. New York: McGraw-Hill, 1954.
- Zieger, Robert H. The CIO, 1935–1955. Chapel Hill, N.C.: University of North Carolina Press, 1995.
