= United Federal Workers of America =

Former trade union of the United States

United Federal Workers UFW
- United Federal Workers of America, CIO
- Merged into: United Public Workers of America
- Founded: 1937
- Dissolved: April 25, 1946
- Location: United States
- Key people: Alexander Frank (president), Eleanor Nelson (vice president)
- Affiliations: Congress of Industrial Organizations

The United Federal Workers of America (UFWA) was an American labor union representing federal government employees which existed from 1937 to 1946. It was the first union with this jurisdiction established by the Congress of Industrial Organizations (a national labor federation). In 1946 it merged with other unions to form the influential United Public Workers of America. The union challenged the constitutionality of the Hatch Act of 1939, which led to the Supreme Court decision in United Public Workers v. Mitchell, 330 U.S. 75 (1947).

The union is sometimes confused with the United Public Workers of America, its successor union.

== History ==
In 1937, the Congress of Industrial Organizations (CIO) formed a new union for U.S. government employees, the United Federal Workers of America (UFWA), from local unions which had disaffiliated from the American Federation of Labor-affiliated American Federation of Government Employees (AFGE). The UFWA's membership, however, remained static (as did the membership of nearly all federal government unions during the Great Depression of the 1930s, when people were grateful for work.). Much of the UFWA leadership was leftist. The leadership was militant in its advocacy of the rights of its members, and most of the national and local union leadership advocated leftist ideals; associated with left-wing intellectuals, activists, and political people; and supported left-wing organizations. This led many politicians and others to believe the organization was Communist-controlled.

The political leanings of the UWFA led to passage of two pieces of legislation intended to restrict its political activities. In June 1938, Congress passed a rider to appropriations legislation that prevented the federal government from making payments (such as salaries) to any person or organization which advocated the overthrow of the federal government (as many communist organizations at the time proposed). In 1939, Congress passed the Hatch Act of 1939, which restricted political campaign activities by federal employees. A provision of the Hatch Act made it illegal for the federal government to employ anyone who advocated the overthrow of the federal government. The UFWA hired lawyer Lee Pressman to challenge the constitutionality of the Hatch Act.

On April 25, 1946, the State, County, and Municipal Workers of America (SCMWA) merged with the UFWA to form the United Public Workers of America. The impetus for the merger was the relative failure of the UFWA to attract new members, and SCMWA essentially absorbed the smaller federal union.

The union's long-standing lawsuit against the Hatch Act of 1939 (with Lee Pressman representing the UFW) finally reached the Supreme Court in 1947. In United Public Workers v. Mitchell, 330 U.S. 75 (1947), the Supreme Court of the United States upheld the Act. Writing for the majority, Associate Justice Stanley Forman Reed argued that the Hatch Act did not infringe on the First Amendment guarantees of free speech and free association but rather on rights guaranteed by the Ninth Amendment (guaranteeing non-enumerated rights to the people) and Tenth Amendment (guaranteeing non-enumerated rights to the states). These rights were not absolute, and could be subordinated to the "elemental need for order" without which all rights ceased to function. Additionally, the non-enumerated rights of the Ninth and Tenth Amendments were subordinate to the enumerated rights granted to the federal government by the Constitution.

Reed upheld the Hatch Act as a legitimate exercise of the enumerated rights of the federal government. The decision in United Public Workers v. Mitchell relied heavily on the "doctrine of privilege," a legal doctrine that held that public employment was a privilege (not a right) and subsequently significant restrictions could be placed on public employees that could not be constitutionally tolerated in the private sector. United Public Workers v. Mitchell proved to be the last gasp of the doctrine of privilege.

The Supreme Court explicitly rejected the doctrine in Wieman v. Updegraff, 344 U.S. 183 (1952). A broad number of high court decisions in areas such as nonpartisan speech, due process, search and seizure, the right to marry, the right to bear children, equal protection, education, and receipt of public benefits over the next two decades continued to undermine the doctrine. Although the Supreme Court later reaffirmed Mitchell in 1973 in Civil Service Comm'n v. Letter Carriers, 413 U.S. 548 (1973), it did so on the grounds that permitting public employees to engage in political activity was dangerous.

== Leadership ==
- Alexander Frank - president
- Eleanor Nelson - vice president

== See also ==
- United Public Workers of America
- State, County, and Municipal Workers of America
- National Federation of Federal Employees
- American Federation of Government Employees
- Abram Flaxer
- United Public Workers v. Mitchell
- Lee Pressman

== Bibliography ==
- Arnesen, Eric. "United Federal Workers of America/United Public Workers of America." In Encyclopedia of U.S. Labor and Working-Class History. New York: Routledge, 2006.
- Gall, Gilbert J. Pursuing Justice: Lee Pressman, the New Deal, and the CIO. Albany, N.Y.: State University of New York Press, 1999.
- Goldstein, Robert Justin, Political Repression in Modern America (University of Illinois Press, 1978, 2001).
- Lyons, John F. Teachers and Reform: Chicago Public Education, 1929-1970. Urbana, Ill.: University of Illinois Press, 2008.
- Menez, Joseph Francis; Vile, John R.; and Bartholomew, Paul Charles. Summaries of Leading Cases on the Constitution. Lanham, Md.: Rowman & Littlefield, 2003.
- Moore, Wayne D. Constitutional Rights and Powers of the People. Princeton, N.J.: Princeton University Press, 1996.
- "New Union Urges Wider Labor Law." New York Times. April 26, 1946.
- Rabin, Jack; Hildreth, W. Bartley; and Miller, Gerald J., eds. Handbook of Public Administration. 3d ed. Washington, D.C.: CRC Press, 2006.
- Rosenbloom, David and O'Leary, Rosemary. Public Administration and Law. 2d ed. Washington, D.C.: CRC Press, 1996.
- Slater, Joseph E. Public Workers: Government Employee Unions, the Law, and the State, 1900-1962. Ithaca, N.Y.: ILR Press, 2004.
- Spero, Sterling D. Government As Employer. New York: Remsen Press, 1948.
- Spero, Sterling D. and Blum, Albert A. Government As Employer. Carbondale, Ill.: Southern Illinois University Press, 1972.
