= Margaret P. Gilmore =

Gilmore c. 1952

Margaret P. Gilmore was an African-American trade union leader and civil rights activist.

Gilmore was chairman of the United Public Workers Union local at the Bureau of Engraving and Printing of the United States Department of the Treasury, in Washington, D.C.. In 1949 she testified before Representative Adam Clayton Powell Jr.'s Fair Employment Practice Committee, reporting that there was rampant discrimination in the bureau. In 1950 she helped lead a picket by workers demanding equal treatment for women and Black employees. The action was successful, and in 1951 the bureau hired seventeen Black veterans as apprentice plate printers. Her contribution to the victory was recognized with a banquet, and by inclusion in the Afro-American newspaper's 1951 honor roll.

Gilmore was married to Dr. Allen C. Gilmore, and they had a daughter, Lydia Elizabeth Gilmore.
