= State, County, and Municipal Workers of America =

Former trade union of the United States

- Merged into: United Public Workers of America
- Founded: 1937
- Dissolved: April 25, 1946
- Location: United States
- Members: 100,000
- Key people: Abram Flaxer
- Affiliations: Congress of Industrial Organizations

The State, County, and Municipal Workers of America (SCMWA) was an American labor union representing state, county, and local government employees. It was created by the Congress of Industrial Organizations (CIO) in 1937 along with United Federal Workers of America. SCMWA's leaders Abram Flaxer and Henry Wenning had been leaders of the Association of Workers of Public Relief Agencies (AWPRA) in New York City prior to the formation of SCMWA.

Through informal negotiations in 1935, AWPRA persuaded the New York City Emergency Relief Board (ERB) to adopt a personnel policy that permitted union representation and granted due process protections against discipline including notice, an opportunity to be heard, and the right to appeal to a neutral board. In cases of general staff reductions, the policy all granted the right to hearing to determine allegations of discrimination because of race, creed. union activity or membership in any special group. The personnel policy was later extended to the entire New York City Welfare Department.

SCMWA is sometimes confused with the American Federation of State, County and Municipal Employees (AFSCME). AFSCME was an affiliate of the American Federation of Labor, and SCMWA was formed following the creation of the CIO. At the time SCMWA was created in 1937, its policies, principles, and tactics were aimed at the establishment of appropriate negotiation procedures and the development of cooperative relationships with employers. As part of its initial policies, SCMWA rejected the use of strikes and picketing; that policy changed a few years later.

SCMWA was active in many states, organizing state and local government workers decades before the enactment of public sector collective bargaining laws. SCMWA negotiated collective bargaining agreements with local public employers that provided for exclusive representation and prohibited discrimination. In 1943, SCMWA negotiated the first collective bargaining agreement for school district teachers and staff with the Board of Education of Gloucester City, New Jersey. It also negotiated some of the first contracts in higher education in the 1940s.

In 1946, the CIO merged SCMWA with United Federal Workers of America to form the United Public Workers of America (UPWA). In 1950, UPWA was purged from the CIO along with other radical unions.

== History ==
In 1937, a number of AFSCME local unions, composed primarily of caseworkers, disaffiliated from that union and joined the Congress of Industrial Organizations (CIO). The CIO allowed these local unions to form the State, County, and Municipal Workers of America, and charged the new organization with competing with AFSCME at the state and local levels for membership. Most of the leaders and many of the members of these local unions were strongly sympathetic to the beliefs and goals of the Communist Party USA. Former AFSCME executive board member Abram Flaxer was appointed the new union's president, and former AFSCME Secretary-Treasurer David Kanes held the same post in SCMWA. SCMWA membership grew quickly: It more than doubled the number of local unions (from 12 to 28) in a year, and its members rose from 25,000 in 1937 to more than 48,000 in 1946. In comparison, AFSCME's membership grew from 13,259 in 1937 to more than 73,000 in 1946.

On April 25, 1946, SCMWA merged with the United Federal Workers of America (UFWA) to form the United Public Workers of America. The impetus for the merger was the relative failure of the UFWA to attract new members, and SCMWA essentially absorbed the smaller federal union.

== See also ==
- United Public Workers of America
- National Federation of Federal Employees
- American Federation of Government Employees

== Bibliography ==
- Billings, Richard N. and Greenya, John. Power to the Public Worker. Washington, D.C.: R.B. Luce, 1974.
- Fink, Gary. Labor Unions. Westport, Conn: Greenwood Press, 1977.
- Galenson, Walter. The CIO Challenge to the AFL: A History of the American Labor Movement. Cambridge, Mass.: Harvard University Press, 1960.
- Lyons, John F. Teachers and Reform: Chicago Public Education, 1929-1970. Urbana, Ill.: University of Illinois Press, 2008.
- Herbert, William A. "Card Check Labor Certification: Lessons from New York." New York: Albany Law Review, Vol. 74, No. 1, 2010/2011.
- Herbert, William A. "The History Books Tell It: Collective Bargaining in Higher Education in the 1940s" The Journal of Collective Bargaining in the Academy, Vol. 9. Art. 3 2017.
- Herbert, William A. "Janus v. AFSCME Council 31: Judges Will Haunt You in the Second Gilded Age" Relations Industrielles/Industrial Relations, Vol. 74 Iss. 1, 2019.
- National Association of Social Workers. Social Work Year Book. New York: Russell Sage Foundation, 1939.
- "New Union Urges Wider Labor Law." New York Times. April 26, 1946.
- Slater, Joseph E. Public Workers: Government Employee Unions, the Law, and the State, 1900-1962. Ithaca, N.Y.: ILR Press, 2004.
- Spero, Sterling D. Government As Employer. New York: Remsen Press, 1948.
- Spero, Sterling D. and Blum, Albert A. Government As Employer. Carbondale, Ill.: Southern Illinois University Press, 1972.
