= Fay Allen (teacher) =

American educator (1887-1974)

Fay E. Allen
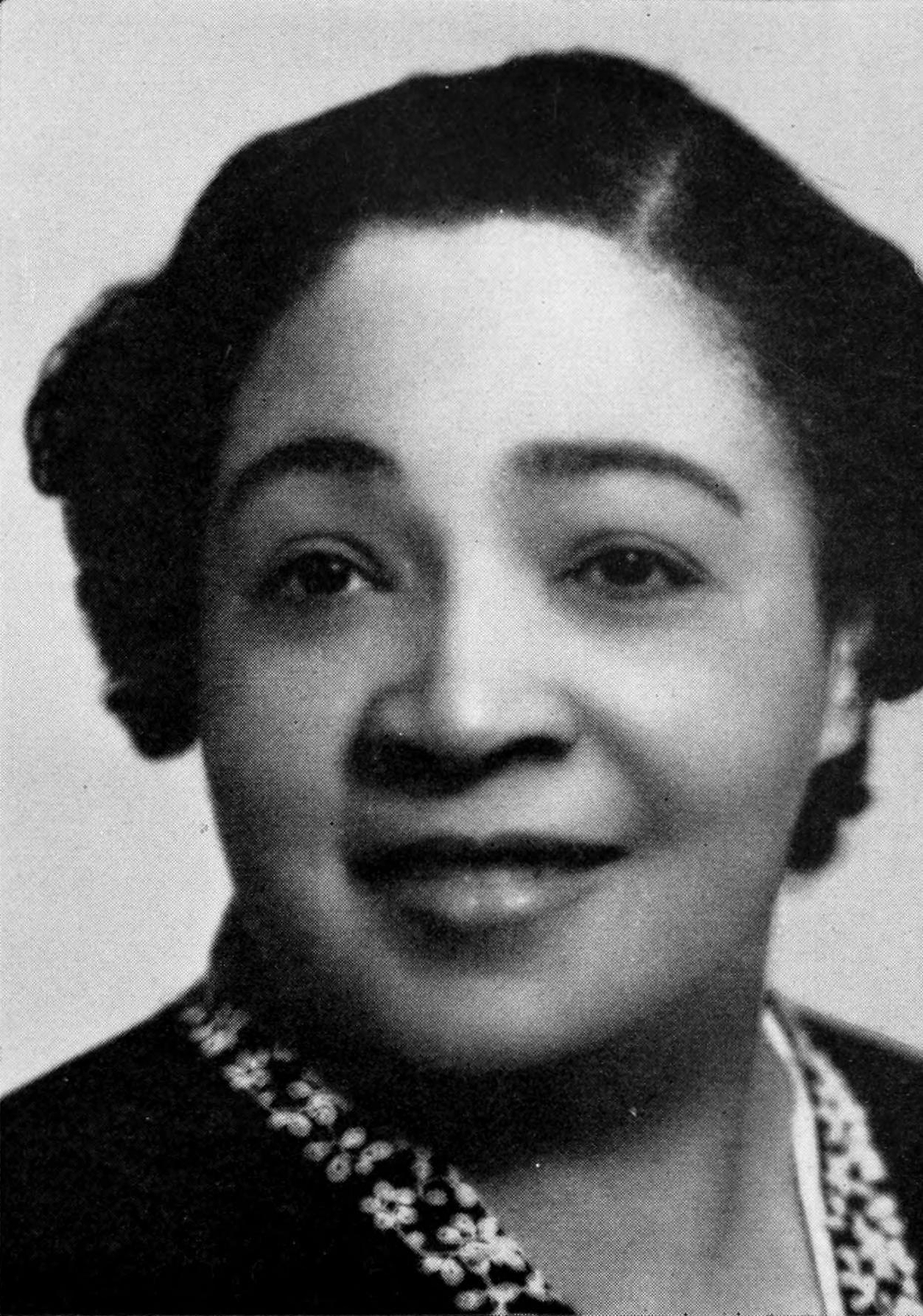
- Allen c. 1940

Member of the Los Angeles Board of Education
- In office May 26, 1939 – July 1, 1943
- Preceded by: Margarete Clark
- Succeeded by: Marie M. Adams

Personal details
- Born: January 4, 1887 Ottumwa, Iowa, U.S.
- Died: October 17, 1974 (aged 87) Los Angeles, California, U.S.
- Party: Democratic
- Children: 6 (adopted)
- Parent: Seth Weeks (father)
- Education: University of Illinois; University of California, Los Angeles
- Occupation: Musician, educator, school administrator, politician

Fay E. Allen (January 4, 1887 – October 17, 1974) was the first ever African American to serve on the Los Angeles Board of Education. She served two terms between 1939 and 1943. After she left the board, she continued to be politically active until her death.

== Background ==
Fay E. Allen was the daughter of Silas Seth Weeks, an internationally recognized musician, and the former Eliza Jane Clark. Her parents split up when Fay was a youngster (her father remarried in 1892). Her father, known professionally as S. S. Weeks, moved to Europe and became a member of the Society of Composers in France.

== Early education and career ==
Allen studied music in her native Iowa, Illinois, and Colorado. As a young woman, she would also frequently visit her father in Europe, where she would study piano, pipe organ, and orchestra. Father and daughter would frequently be invited to play for European royalty including King Gustav of Sweden.

Allen later pursued special studies at University of Illinois and University of California, Los Angeles.

== Educator and school administrator ==
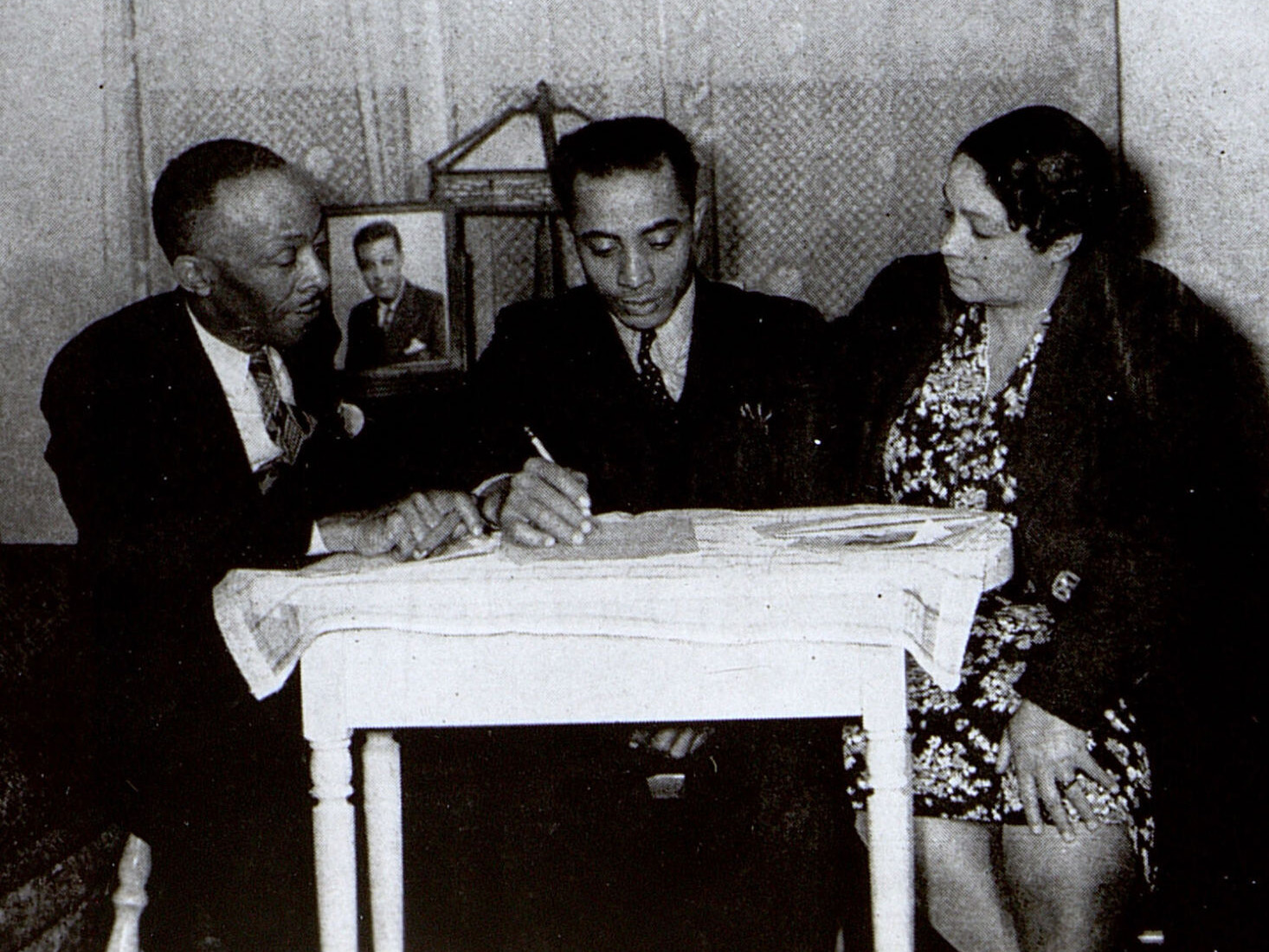
Allen (right) with Robert P. Strather and Gilbert W. Lindsay, 1937.

Allen was a music teacher at LAUSD and was described as "intelligent, traveled and experienced" in The Los Angeles Times. She was devoted to the students she worked with and wanted to make a greater impact. In 1937, Allen first ran for a seat on the board and lost.

Allen was not deterred by her initial failure and ran for the seat again in 1939, advocating for standardized, revised and modernized school curriculum, public education beyond just high school, and school board member elections according to district. In her second campaign, she was endorsed by the Federation for Civic Betterment, an organization that was considered radical at the time. Despite the media's view on the Federation, however, they helped secure Allen a seat on the board; she was elected on May 2 and sworn in on Friday, May 26, 1939 (rather than July 1, when the new term officially began), to complete the unexpired term of her predecessor, Margarete Clark. According to the Los Angeles Times, Mrs. Allen was the first African American woman to hold public office in a major American city.

Allen's campaign manager, Gilbert W. Lindsay, later became the first black member of the Los Angeles City Council.

During her time on the board, Allen received a significant amount of scrutiny, despite the fact that she had an overwhelming amount of support from organizations such as the Los Angeles Teachers Federation, the L.A. Industrial Union Council, and the L.A. Democratic Central Committee. The controversy surrounding her tenure on the board continued both during and after her term.

During the 1940 Democratic Party presidential primaries, Allen joined a left-wing slate pledged to lieutenant governor Ellis E. Patterson for president. They opposed incumbent Franklin D. Roosevelt on the grounds he was focusing too much on foreign affairs and not enough on domestic unemployment. The Patterson slate lost to Roosevelt's by a margin of fifteen to one.

One of Allen's biggest achievements while serving on the Board was in 1941, during discussions regarding the 1941-42 budget. There was a provision in the proposed budget to charge tuition for individuals attending adult education classes. At first, Mrs. Allen was the only one on the seven member panel who was opposed to the measure. However, after students, teachers, and citizens (including members of the Los Angeles County Democratic Central Committee) joined Mrs. Allen in opposition to the tuition fee at a public hearing, the other six board members reversed their support of the proposal.

In 1943, Mrs. Allen lost her bid for a third term despite endorsements from the American Federation of Teachers, Congress of Industrial Organizations. American Federation of Labor, Spanish Speaking People's Congress, SCMWA, and Musicians Union, Local 767. She also received endorsements from several prominent individuals including Charlotta Bass (publisher of the California Eagle), Assemblyman Augustus Hawkins, actor Clarence Muse, entertainer Ethel Waters, and Al S. Waxman (publisher of the Eastside Journal).

In the primary, Mrs. Allen finished fourth in a race for four at-large seats, but was the only one of the top vote getters not to receive a sufficient number of votes to avoid a run-off. On May 4 of that year, she faced Marie M. Adams, the fifth-place finisher, in the run-off. Mrs. Adams was endorsed by the Los Angeles Times and the Daily News. When backers of Mrs. Allen accused supporters of Mrs. Adams of injecting racial bias into the campaign, the Times defended their endorsement by stating, "This newspaper has opposed the election of Mrs. Allen heretofore because The Times has felt that she does not fill the requirements for school administration service. The election of Mrs. Adams is recommended. As in all other ballot recommendations, the suggestions of The Times with respect to Mrs. Allen and Mrs. Adams are based solely on the newspaper's opinion concerning their respective qualifications for office.

In contrast, Al S. Waxman, publisher of the Eastside Journal wrote a scathing editorial criticising the campaign of Mrs. Adams, which he felt placed an undue emphasis on the race of her opponent. This was after the paper received a written request by Richmond P. Benton & Sons, a public relations firm representing her campaign, to place a political ad in the Journal. In the letter, the firm indicated that their goal was "to defeat Mrs. Fay Allen, a Negress."

In an open letter to Richmond P. Benton & Sons, Waxman wrote:

Your letter lays unusual stress on the fact that Mrs. Allen is a Negress. (You do not even give her the courtesy of placing a capital letter at the head of Negress.) That type of politics would be in place in Germany or any Nazi dominated nation but this is democratic America. Remember? Where every man is equal!

After the votes were tabulated, Mrs. Adams, despite being a political novice, won decisively. She received more votes than even the three board members that won outright. Mrs. Allen, on the other hand, received even fewer votes than she received in the previous race.

After Mrs. Allen left office, over twenty years would pass before another African American would serve on the Board of Education. Rev. James E. Jones, pastor of the Westminster Presbyterian Church, was sworn in on Monday, June 14, 1965.

== Activities after leaving Board of Education ==
In 1954, Los Angeles County Supervisor Kenneth Hahn appointed Mrs. Allen to the Los Angeles County Music Commission. She was re-appointed by Hahn for another three-year term in 1957.

In 1962, she served as campaign manager in Don Derricks's unsuccessful bid for a seat on the California State Assembly. In a hotly contested seat, Derricks finished third out of eight candidates in the Democratic primary which included Mervyn Dymally (the eventual winner) and Edward A. Hawkins (the brother of the outgoing Assemblyman Augustus Hawkins, who was running for Congress), who finished in second place.
