= Nicolás García Uriburu =

Argentine artist and activist

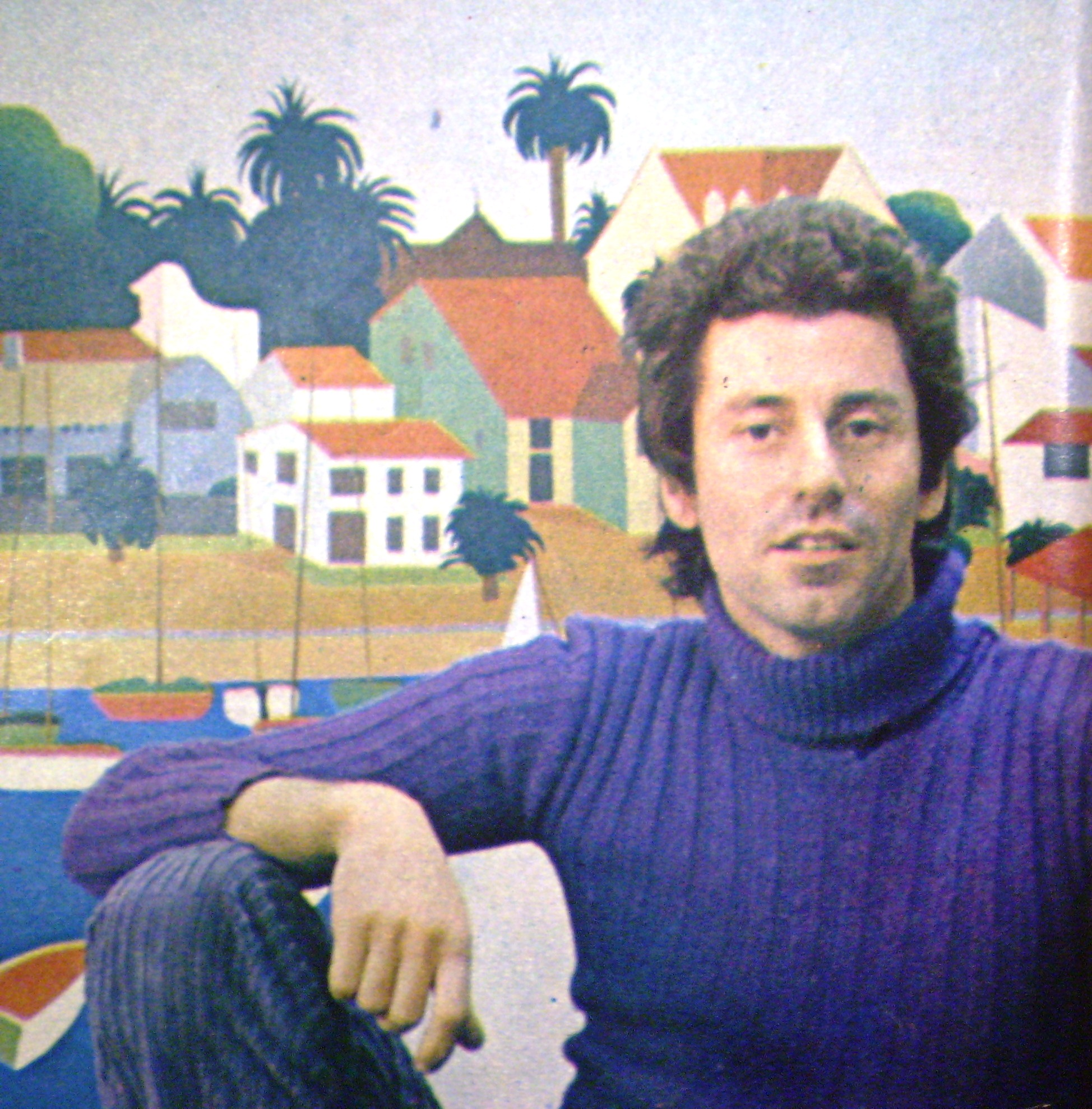
Nicolás García Uriburu (1971).

Nicolás García Uriburu (December 24, 1937 – June 19, 2016) was an Argentine artist, landscape architect, and ecologist. His work in land art was aimed at raising consciousness about environmental issues such as water pollution.

== Life and work ==
Born in Buenos Aires in 1937, García Uriburu began painting at an early age and, in 1954, secured his first exhibition at the local Müller Gallery. He enrolled at the University of Buenos Aires, where he received a degree in architecture, and relocated to Paris with his wife, Blanca Isabel Álvarez de Toledo, in 1965, where he was granted an artist-in-residence at Cité internationale des arts in 1966.He would later father a child named Azul with Blanca. His Three Graces, a sculpture in the pop art style, earned him a Grand Prize at the National Sculpture Salon in 1968. Venturing into conceptual art, he mounted an acrylic display at the Iris Clert Gallery, creating an artificial garden that set a new direction for his work towards environmental activism.

García Uriburu was invited to the prestigious Venice Biennale in June 1968, where he dyed Venice's Grand Canal using fluorescein, a pigment which turns a bright green when synthesized by microorganisms in the water. Between 1968 and 1970, he repeated the feat in New York's East River, the Seine, in Paris, and in Buenos Aires, initially at the mouth of polluted southside Riachuelo but carried out in the Rio de la Plata.

A pioneer in what became known as land art, he created a montage in pastel colors over photographs of the scenes in 1970, allowing unlimited photographic reproduction of the work for the sake of raising awareness of worsening water pollution worldwide. In addition to environmental conservation he produced works of art that showcased humanistic naturalism and antagonism between society and nature, such as Unión de Latinoamérica por los ríos (Latin America Union for Rivers) and No a las fronteras políticas (No to Political Borders).

García Uriburu applied his fluorescein treatment on such diverse waterways as Paris' Lac de Vincennes (1971), the Trocadéro fountains (1972), the Port of Nice (1974) and the Port of Antwerp (1974). He continued to devote his art to the portrayal of endangered species and habitat loss, and was honored with a Grand Prize at the Tokyo Biennale in 1975. In 1981, he was invited by the German Green Party to dye the Rhine during a national day of protest called "Wasserfest". Here he was approached by Joseph Beuys, who had been a co-founder of the Green Party, and asked if he could collaborate. The two artists would go on to collaborate the following year at the Kassel Documenta 7 exposition to carry out Beuys's project of planting 7,000 oaks. He and Beuys shared similar views on humanism, social philosophy, ecology and libertarianism.

García Uriburu returned to Buenos Aires in 1982, following which he planted 50,000 trees. Remaining active in the city's tree-planting effort, he turned to portrait art and in 1993, was invited to the renowned Ruth Benzacar Gallery on Florida Street to present Utopía del Sur (Southern Utopia), a display devoted to his cause.

During the final years while still active in his cause in Argentina, García Uriburu directed tree-planting efforts in neighboring Uruguay and organized protests over the unabated degradation of Buenos Aires' industrial Riachuelo waterway, jointly with Greenpeace. He also taught secondary school students and presided over the Foundation, which bears his name, displays his art and houses an extensive ethnographic museum devoted to Pre-Columbian art.

In 2010, Nicolás Uriburu received the Creative Careers Award from the Center for Creativity Economics of Universidad del CEMA. "It is very difficult to make a true contribution to modern art, which changes the art we see and the way we think about it. It is also very difficult to make a true contribution to raising awareness of social problems such as the destruction of the environment. When someone does both, with elegance and humility, it is an extraordinary achievement", David Galenson, academic director of the Center for Creativity Economics, said on the occasion.

In 2017, García Uriburu was again invited to the Venice Biennale, this time as part of the main exhibition, titled VIVA ARTE VIVA.

== Prizes and recognition ==
Uriburu earned a number of prizes both in his native Argentina and abroad:

- Gran Premio de Pintura Nacional (National Grand prize in Painting, Argentina 1968)
- Prix Lefranc (Paris, 1968)
- 1st place Tokyo Biennial (Tokyo, 1975)
- Premio Braque (Buenos Aires, 1993)
- Primer Premio Otium Ecología (Buenos Aires, 1993)
- Fondo Nacional de las Artes' Premio a la Trayectoria (National Fund for the Arts: Career achievement award, Argentina 2000)
- 2010, Premio Carreras Creativas, Centro de Economía de la Creatividad, Universidad del CEMA, Buenos Aires
- Platinum Konex Award (Konex Foundation, Argentina 2002)

== See also ==
- Land art
- Joseph Beuys
- Conservation movement
