= Gilbert W. Lindsay =

American politician

Gilbert William Lindsay
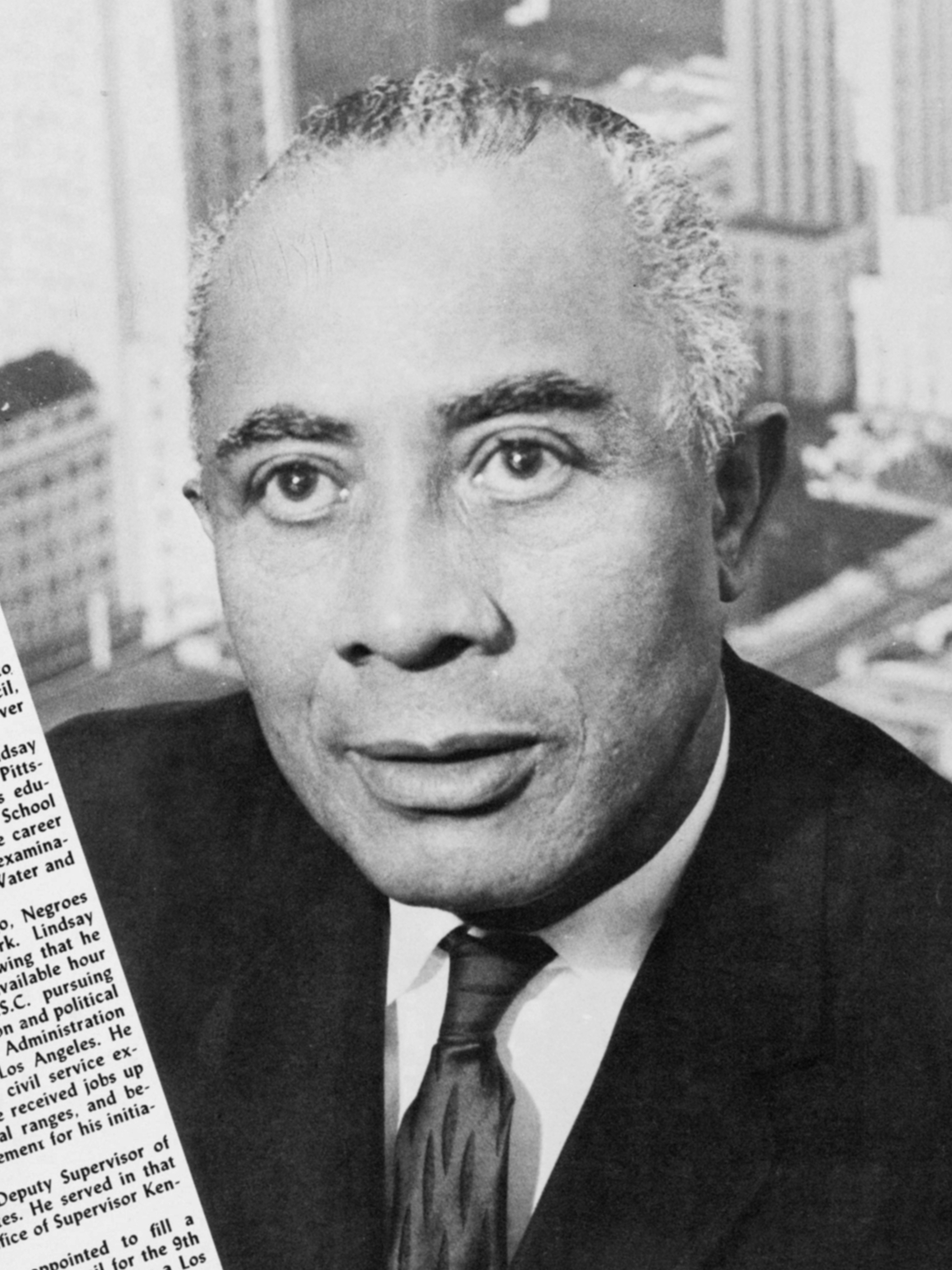
- Lindsay c. 1966

Member of the Los Angeles City Council from the 9th District
- In office January 28, 1963 – December 28, 1990
- Preceded by: Edward Roybal
- Succeeded by: Rita Walters

Personal details
- Born: November 29, 1900 Meridian, Mississippi, U.S.
- Died: December 28, 1990 (aged 90) Los Angeles, California, U.S.
- Party: Democratic
- Spouse: Theresa Willis (m. 1935; died 1984)
- Children: Sylvia; Melvin; Herbert; Christina
- Education: University of Arizona; University of Southern California; University of California, Los Angeles

Military service
- Allegiance: United States
- Branch/service: United States Army
- Years of service: 1920–1923
- Unit: 10th Cavalry Regiment; 25th Infantry Regiment

Gilbert William Lindsay (November 29, 1900 – December 28, 1990) was an American politician who worked his way up from Los Angeles City Hall janitor to become the city's first black City Council member and one of its most powerful elected officials.

== Biography ==
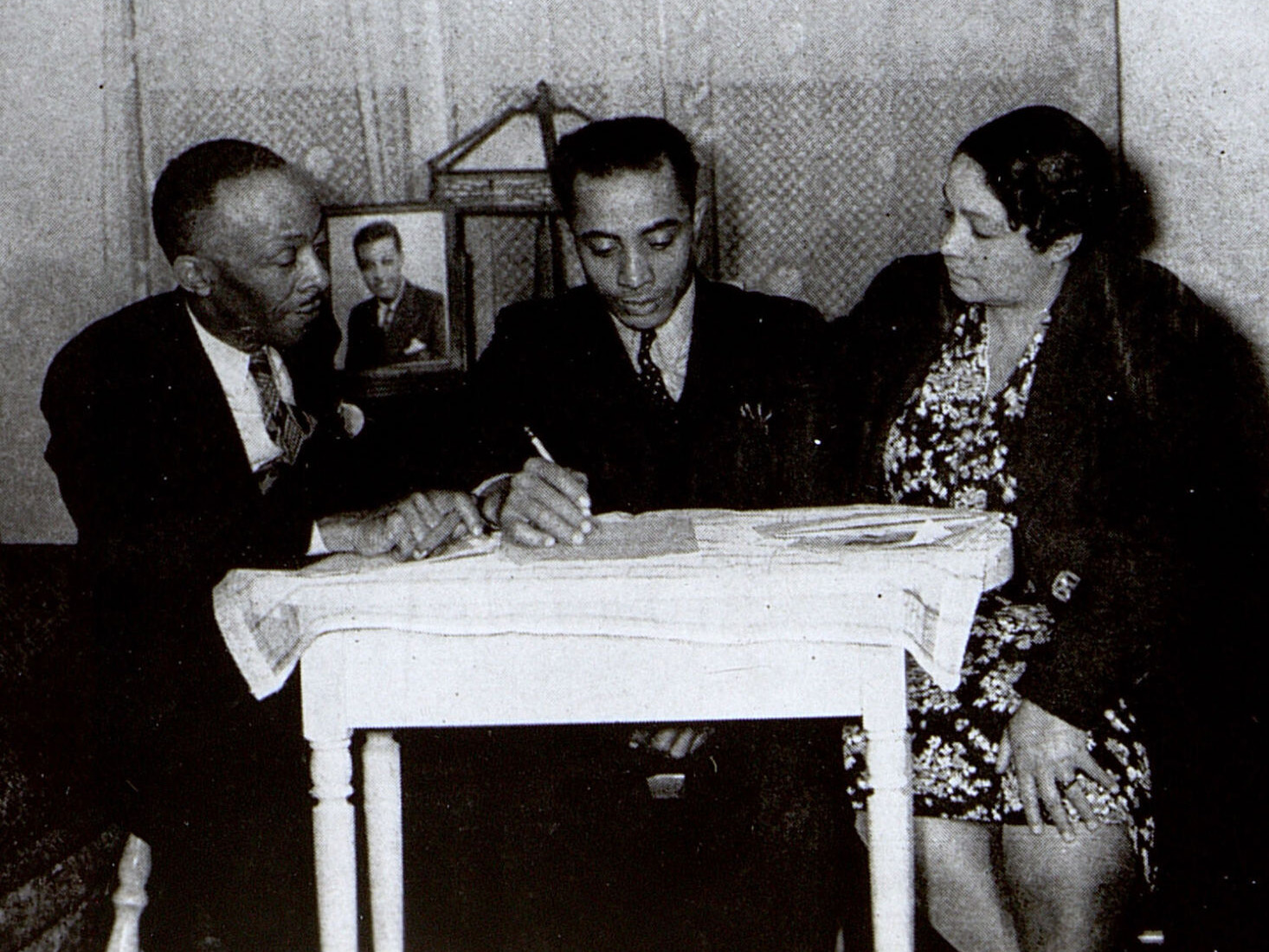
Lindsay (center) with Robert P. Strather and Fay Allen in 1937.

Lindsay was born in Meridian, Mississippi on November 29, 1900. He worked in the cotton fields as a youth, leaving the state as a teenager and enrolling in a school in Pittsburgh, Pennsylvania. He then moved to Arizona, where he joined the Army and served in the 10th Cavalry and the 25th Infantry. As part of an Army program, he studied business administration at the University of Arizona. He moved to Los Angeles in 1923 or 1924 and became a City Hall janitor with the Los Angeles Department of Water and Power. He took a civil service exam for a clerkship, and was given a basement office because his superiors did not want him to sit with whites. He took classes in governmental administration and political science at the University of Southern California and studied business administration at UCLA during the 25 years he worked for the department. He was a member of Phi Beta Sigma fraternity.

About his years as a janitor, the Los Angeles Times quoted him as saying, "I used to scrub toilets for the city of Los Angeles with a mop—that was my job [...] I had the lowest job you can give a human being." but the Los Angeles Sentinel, a black-oriented newspaper, cited C. A. (Bob) Barker, a Los Angeles businessman, as saying, "He was a helluva janitor! That was an important job for Negroes at that time. He gave the janitor's job the same respect he gave the council position. Whatever Gil was doing was very important to him."

He was known as being a short man, standing five feet, three inches tall.

Lindsay's wife, Theresa, was from Greenville, Texas. It was said that Lindsay "began to decline mentally and physically" after Theresa died in 1984; they had been married 49 years. He had a son, Melvin; a daughter, Sylvia Thornton, a stepson, Herbert Howard, and an adopted daughter, Christina Willoughby.

== Public service ==
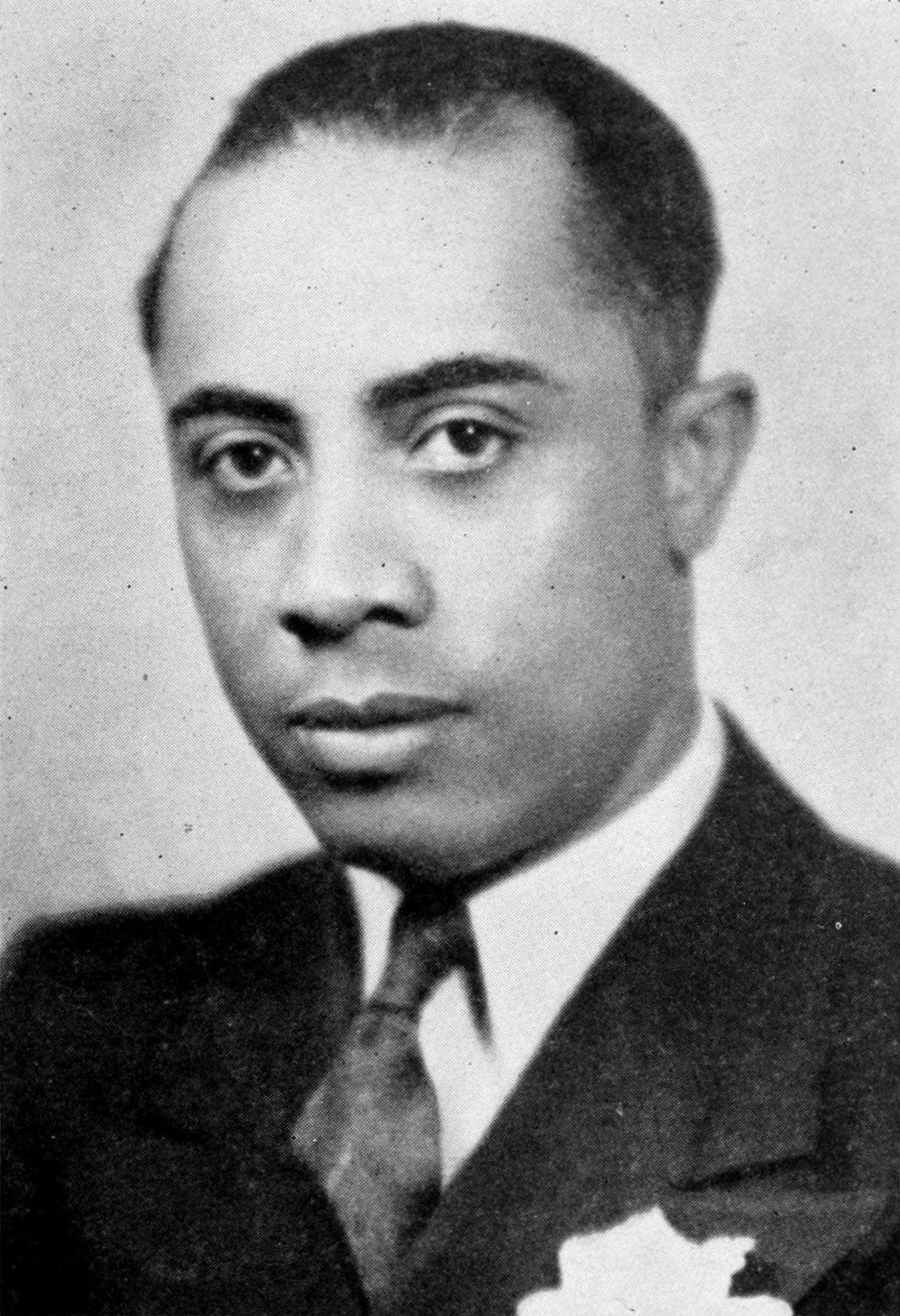
Lindsay as chairman of the Colored Division of the Los Angeles County Democratic Party, 1940

Lindsay became involved in Democratic and labor politics and became so influential that his bosses in Water and Power "called on him to turn out the black vote on various bond issues." In 1939, he served as campaign manager for Fay E. Allen, who was the first black woman elected to public office in a major American city. He was on the board of directors of the National Association for the Advancement of Colored People from 1953 to 1958 and was also an NAACP vice president. He was tapped by City Council candidate Kenneth Hahn as his aide to turn out the black vote. Hahn won and when he later became a county supervisor he appointed Lindsay as a field deputy, a job that Lindsay held for ten years, until 1963.

=== City Council ===
==== Appointment and elections ====
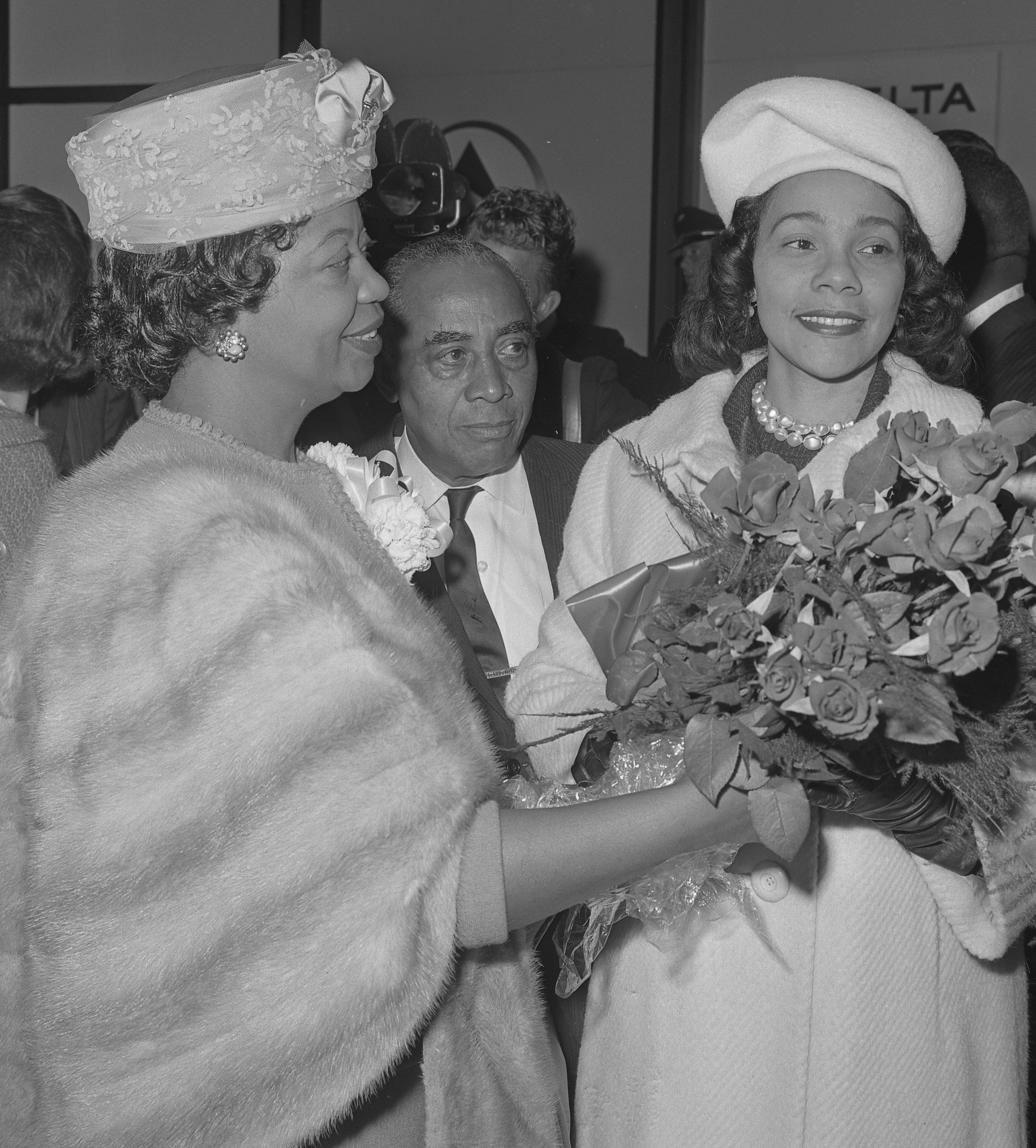
Lindsay (center) with Coretta Scott King upon her arrival in Los Angeles in 1965.

Lindsay became Los Angeles's first black council member at the age of 62 when, with the backing of the political Hahn brothers—Gordon and Kenneth—he was appointed to a vacant 9th District Council seat in January 1963 after Ed Roybal won election to Congress. He won election in his own right later in the year and was reelected to eight successive terms. As the years passed, he proclaimed himself the "Emperor of the Great 9th District." Lindsay's term of 27 years was surpassed only by those of John S. Gibson, Jr. (30 years), Marvin Braude, 31 years, Ernani Bernardi (32 years) and John Ferraro (35 years).

==== Positions ====
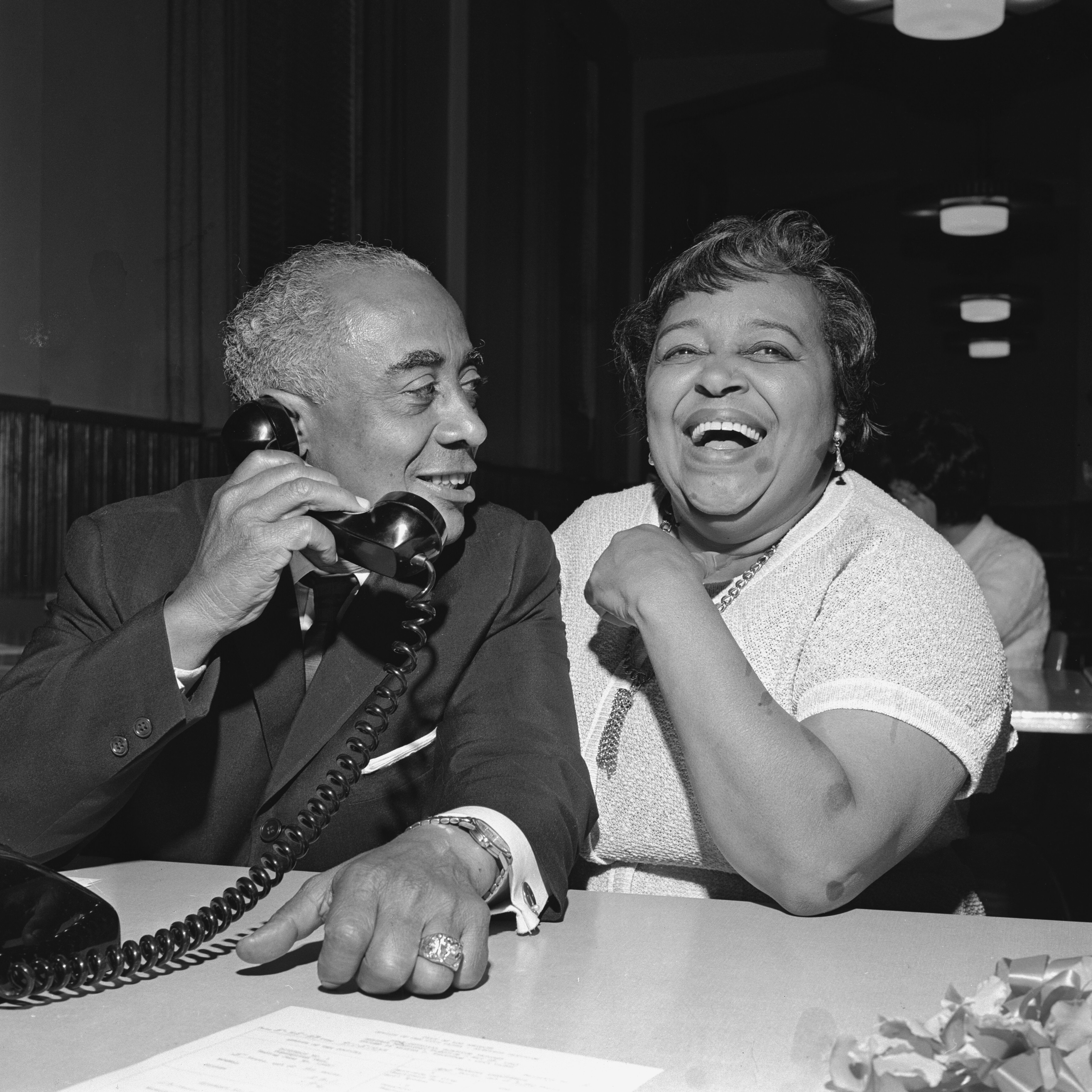
Lindsay with his wife Theresa in 1963.

Developers. Over the years, Lindsay attracted criticism "that he was too cozy with big developers, that he favored Downtown Los Angeles and neglected the neighborhoods." He was often criticized for supporting Downtown "at the expense of the southern portion of his district." But City News Service writer Cathy Franklin said of him: "During his nearly three decades in office, the downtown area exploded into one of the premier business centers of the world."

Blue lights. Lindsay clashed "in a bitter personal exchange" with Councilman Ernani Bernardi when the latter introduced a resolution aimed at removing the blue lights that Lindsay had had installed on the rear of his city automobile. Lindsay later agreed to remove the lights but said: "The thing that disturbs me is that my colleagues equivocate over frivolous motions that amount to nothing. They gag at a gnat and swallow a camel."

Morals. The 9th District councilman opined that San Fernando Valley communities would "not be having problems with topless-bottomless bars if moral levels matched those" of his Downtown Los Angeles and South L.A. district. "We have clean-minded people and a clean district," he said. "All this junk is out there where the affluent aristocrats, the holier-than-thou people live."

Council members. Interviewed by Los Angeles Times reporter Janet Clayton for an article about relationships among City Council members, Lindsay noted in 1984 that "All the council members get along fine when they need a vote. Otherwise, they can't stand each other, or I should say, don't genuinely like each other. They each have their own agenda, you know." He said he has a "simple formula" for deciding issues: "When I give my word on a vote, I haven't reneged, least not more than a half dozen times in 20 years. I vote my district, then my friends, and, what's good for me."

Skid Row. The Times noted that Lindsay, "whose district includes Skid Row, has always favored upscale commercial and residential development in the area, the last big undeveloped stretch of downtown Los Angeles." In 1987 the councilman, along with a group of business owners objected to putting more residential and treatment centers in Skid Row on the grounds they were "drawing the homeless, including the mentally ill" to an area that had "great potential for commercial growth."

== Afterword ==
In April 1992, a Superior Court jury ruled that Juanda Chauncie, Lindsay's 40-year-old girlfriend, had taken advantage of the councilman to gain control of his money and property. The five-woman, seven-man panel ruled that Chauncie had used undue influence over him and awarded $235,000 to Lindsay's stepson and estate. Attorney Johnnie Cochran's firm represented the estate.

== Illness and death ==
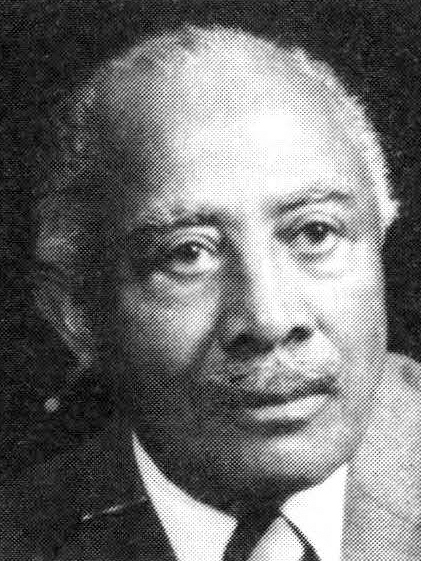
Official portrait, 1986

Lindsay suffered a stroke in 1989 that reduced him simply to being the "titular leader" of the 9th District, with much of the real power in the hands of Bob Gay, his chief assistant, the Downtown News reported. "On the Council floor, he has had moments of confusion, and been both humored and manipulated by the other councilmembers. Those who deal with him say that he has moments of tremendous clarity, but that he is largely removed from the day-to-day workings of the office." Lindsay had lost "some control of his hands and has had trouble writing." City Council President John Ferraro said that Lindsay had "deteriorated to the point where he was incapable of doing his job." Lindsay was sent to a hospital again when, in the midst of the excitement occasioned by a planned visit to City Hall by South African anti-apartheid leader Nelson Mandela, he forgot to take his diabetes medicine and collapsed.

He was brought to a hospital in Inglewood, California, where he remained until his fellow City Council members talked about removing him from his Council seat because he had been outside the Los Angeles city limits for more than 90 days. He was then transferred to "another facility within Los Angeles to make him less vulnerable to efforts to unseat him."

By then in his 28th year as a City Council member, Lindsay died in a Hollywood hospital December 28, 1990, "as a result of a long illness which began with a severe stroke in early September that left him paralyzed on the right side and unable to speak and, at the end, was complicated by a heart attack." A funeral service was held at Victory Baptist Church, and he was buried in Evergreen Cemetery. Lindsay was a member of People's Baptist Church.

== Legacy ==
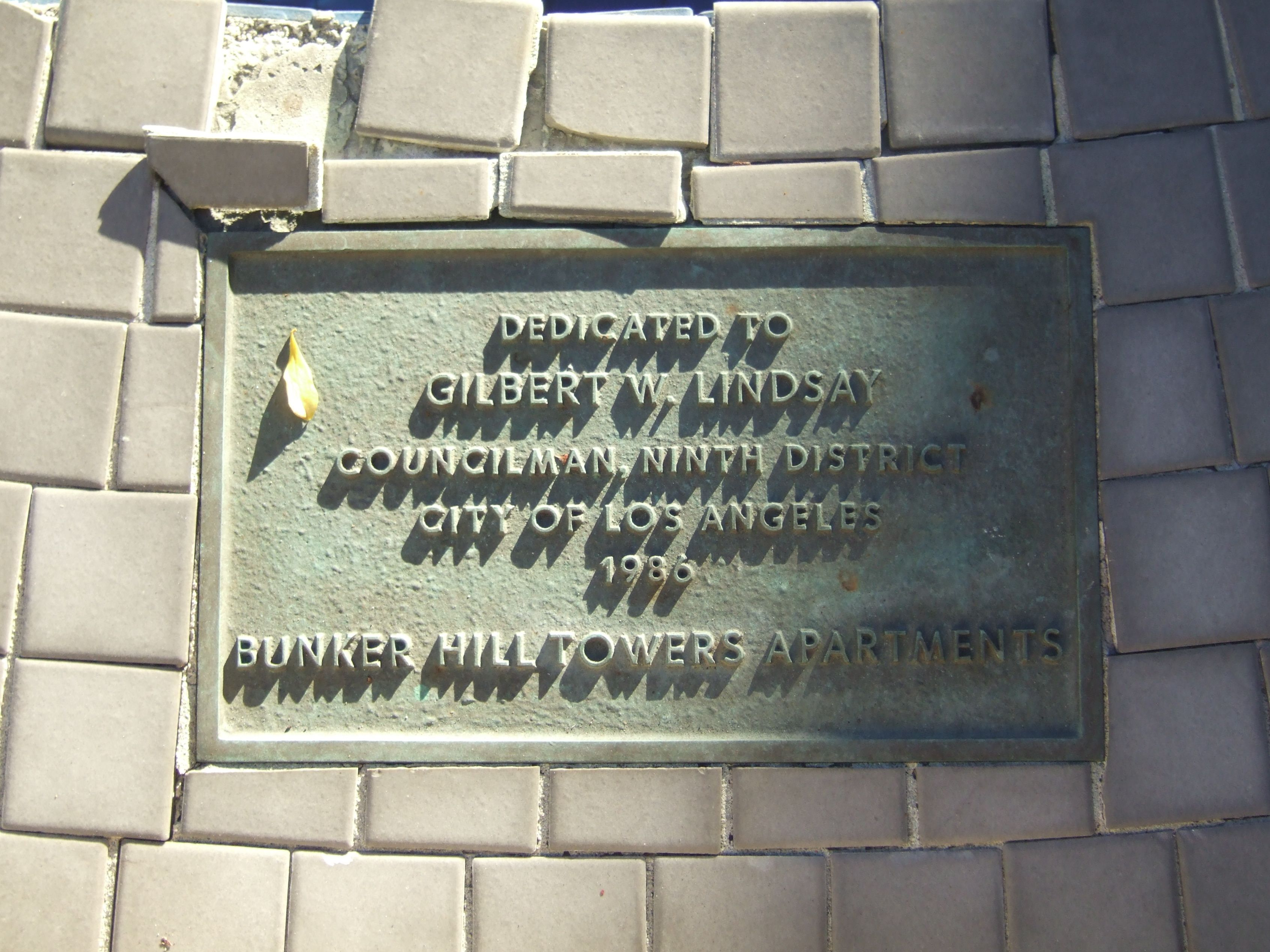
Plaque honoring Lindsay at Bunker Hill Towers

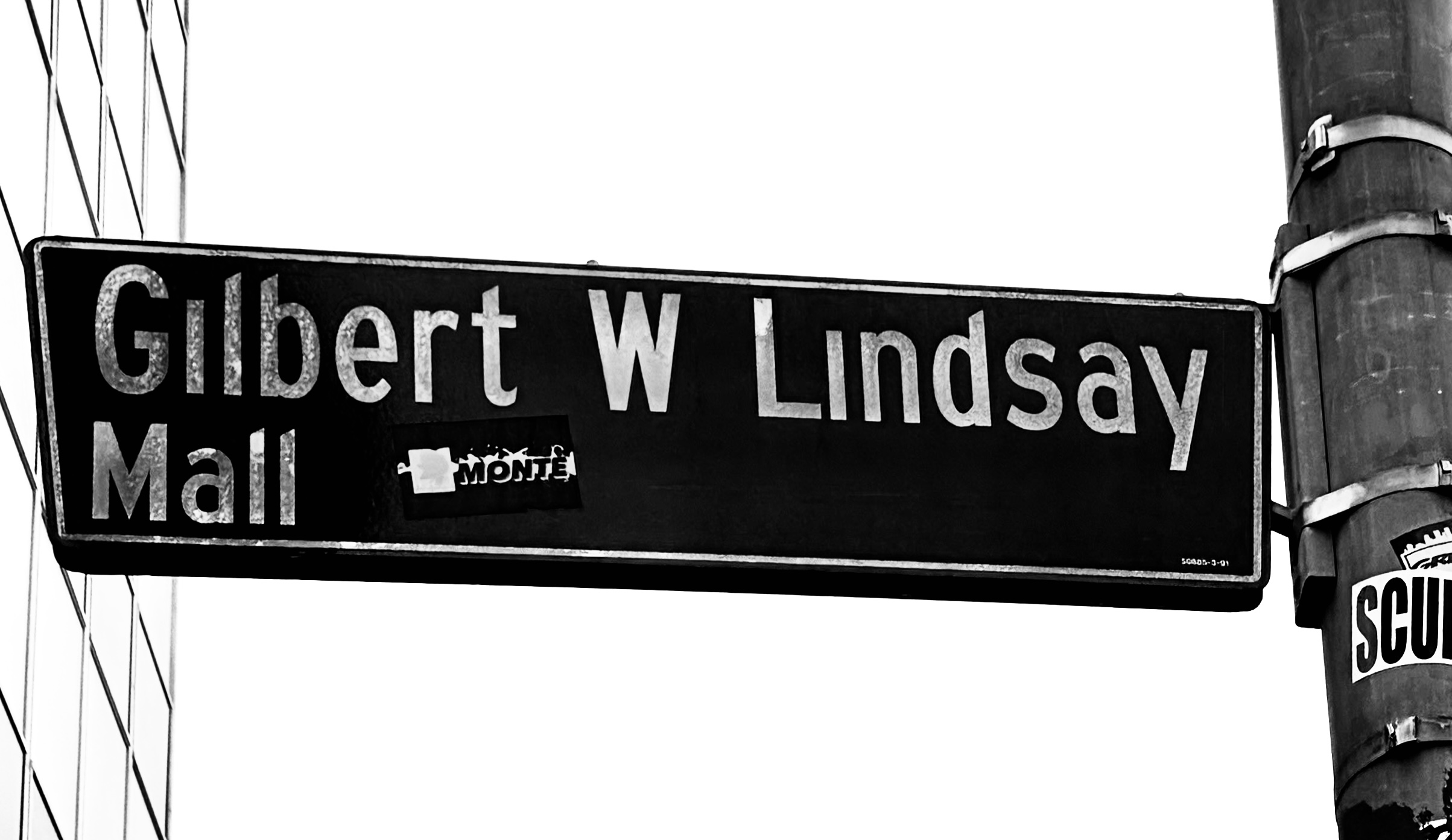
Gilbert Lindsay Mall at Little Tokyo, Los Angeles

- The Gilbert W. Lindsay Child Abuse Center at California Medical Hospital "for the councilman's contributions to the Central City community"
- The Gilbert W. Lindsay Endowed Public Policy Forum in Forensic Science at California State University, Los Angeles
- A $250,000, 10-foot-high-artwork by Pat Ward Williams entitled The Emperor of the Great 9th District on the Gilbert Lindsay Plaza fronting the Los Angeles Convention Center
- Gilbert Lindsay Mall, a small plaza at the end of an alley off 2nd Street in Little Tokyo
- Gilbert Lindsay Recreation Center, 429 East 42nd Street

Preceded by Edward R. Roybal	Los Angeles City Council; 9th District; 1963–90	Succeeded by Rita Walters
