= David Galenson =

American economist

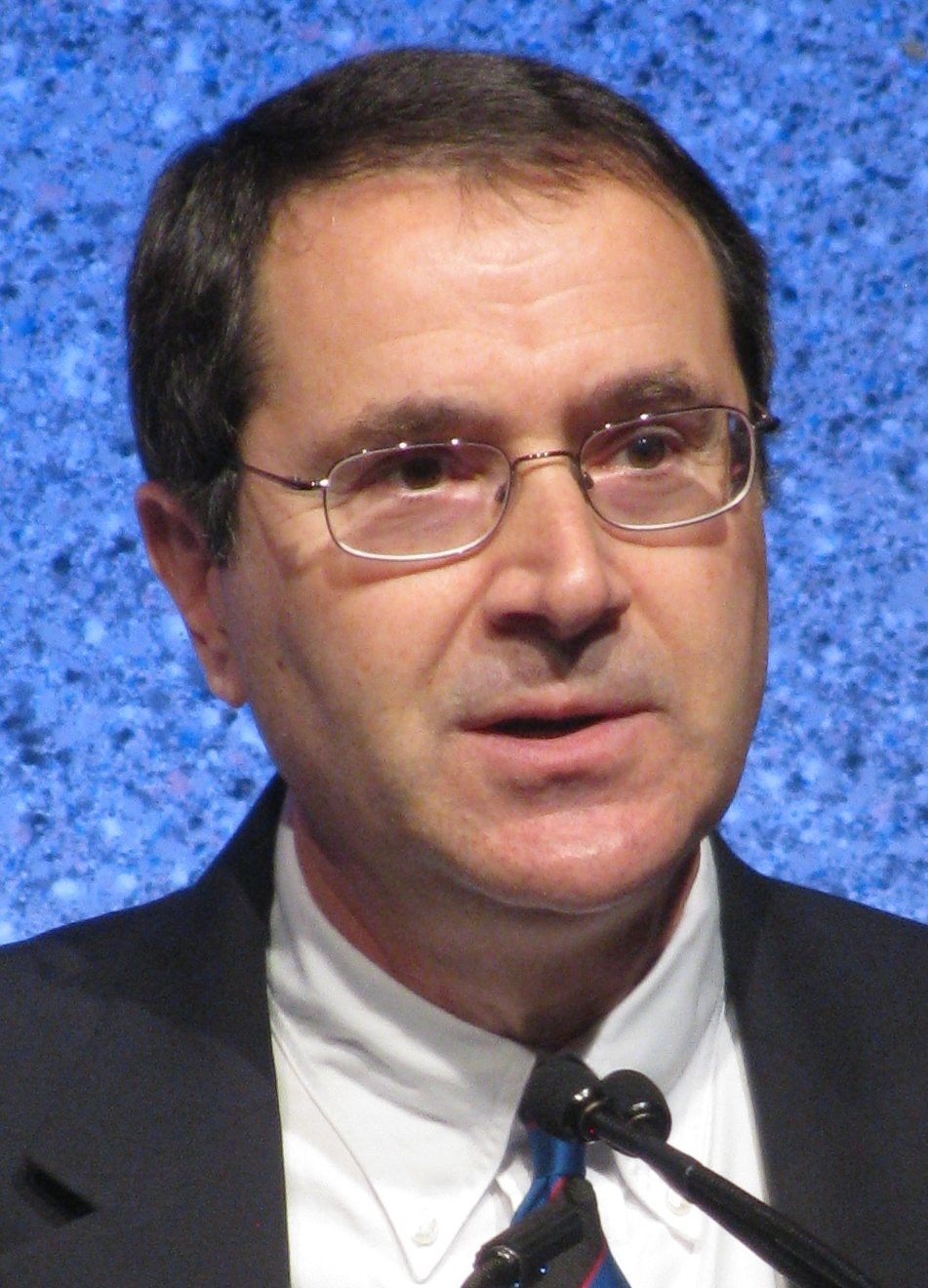
David W. Galenson

David Walter Galenson (born June 20, 1951) is a professor in the Department of Economics and the College at the University of Chicago, and a research associate of the National Bureau of Economic Research. He has been a visiting professor at the California Institute of Technology, Massachusetts Institute of Technology, the University of Texas at Austin, the École des Hautes Études en Sciences Sociales in Paris, and the American University of Paris. He is the Academic Director of the Center for Creativity Economics, which was inaugurated in 2010 at the Universidad del CEMA, Buenos Aires.

He is the son of economists Marjorie and Walter Galenson. He attended Phillips Academy. He then studied at Harvard College for both his undergraduate and graduate education, completing his PhD in 1979.

== Contributions ==
Galenson is known for postulating a new theory of artistic creativity. Based on a study of the ages at which various innovative artists made their greatest contributions to the field, Galenson's theory divides all artists into two classes: conceptualists, who make radical innovations in their field at a very early age; and experimentalists, whose innovations develop slowly over a long period of experimentation and refinement.

Although Galenson initially developed his theory from data solely concerning the visual arts, he has since also investigated conceptual and experimental innovators among poets, novelists, film makers, popular musicians and economists. Elias et al (2020) and Elias et al (2022) combine Galenson´s approach with Paul Romer approach to innovation to analyze innovations and innovators in the Argentine wine industry and the Peruvian cuisine respectively.

Among the examples Galenson cites of conceptualists are:

- F. Scott Fitzgerald, who wrote The Great Gatsby at 29.
- Pablo Picasso, who painted Les Demoiselles d'Avignon at 26.
- Orson Welles, who made Citizen Kane at 26.
- Nicolas Garcia Uriburu, who dyed the waters of Venice's Grand Canal green at 30.

Among the examples he gives of experimentalists are:

- Paul Cézanne, whose most recent work, the paintings of his last few years, come to be considered his greatest contribution, and would directly influence every important artistic development of the decades that followed.
- Mark Twain, who wrote Adventures of Huckleberry Finn at 50.
- Alfred Hitchcock, who made Vertigo at 59.
- Charles Darwin, who spent decades accumulating evidence on evolution and its mechanisms, and made his greatest contributions late in his career.

In 2008, he was awarded a Guggenheim Fellowship in fine arts research.

Comics theorist Scott McCloud seems to have anticipated some aspects of Galenson's theory in his 1993 book Understanding Comics.

He talks about his ideas in the Shaping Business Minds Through Art podcast in 2020.

== Criticisms ==
Galenson's distinction between conceptual and experimental is based upon evidence from the age in which artists were most productive creatively. However, other studies have challenged that the underlying cause is not age, but are due to artistic movements which occur in certain periods. Artists in artistic movements tend to be creative regardless of their age. Thus, Galenson's theory has been criticized for overemphasizing the individual and overlooking the collective aspects in supporting creativity.
