= Abram Flaxer =

20th-century American labor leader

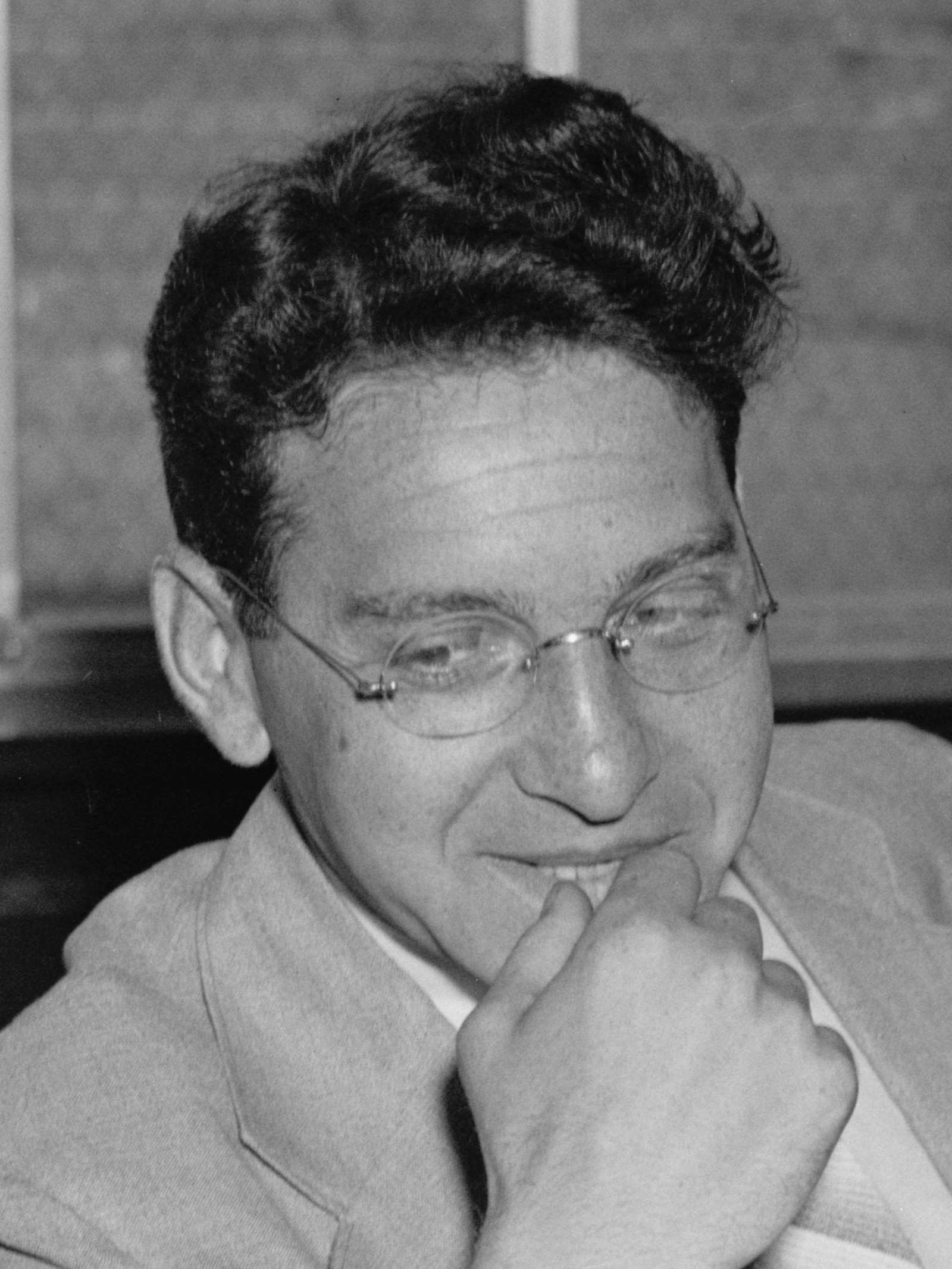
- Flaxer in 1937
- Born: Abraham Flaxer; September 12, 1904; Vilnius, Lithuania (then, Russian Empire)
- Died: January 11, 1989 (aged 84)
- Known for: Founder of SCMWA, President of UFWA
- Political party: Communist Party USA
- Spouses: Victoria White; Charlotte Rosswaag

Abram Flaxer (1904-1989) was an American union leader who founded the State, County, and Municipal Workers of America (SCMWA), which merged with the United Federal Workers of America (UFWA) to form the United Public Workers of America (UPWA), of which he became president.

== Early life ==
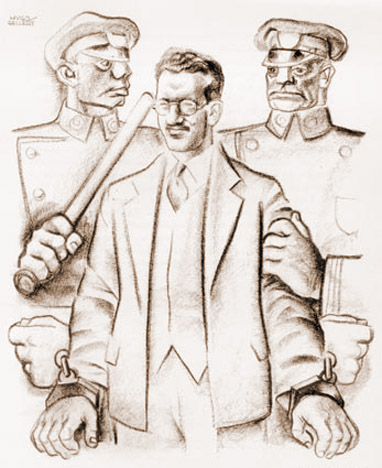
Flaxer supported a group against "The Arrest of Morris Schappes" (here, a drawing by Hugo Gellert, depicting Schappes' arrest amidst Rapp-Coudert Committee hearings (1941)

Abram Flaxer was born "Abraham Flaxer" on September 11, 1904, in Vilnius, Russian Empire (now Lithuania). Around 1910, his family immigrated to the United States, where they settled in the Williamsburg, Brooklyn area of New York City. He studied at the Rand School of Social Science and then the City College of New York, where he received a BS (or AB). He joined the "Pen and Hammer" (Marxist) club and supported the defense of professor Morris Schappes. In 1932, he obtained a degree from New York University Law School; that summer, he also studied mathematics at Columbia University. In 1935, he told his first wife Victoria that he would be joining the Communist Party USA under the Party name "John Brant."

== Career ==
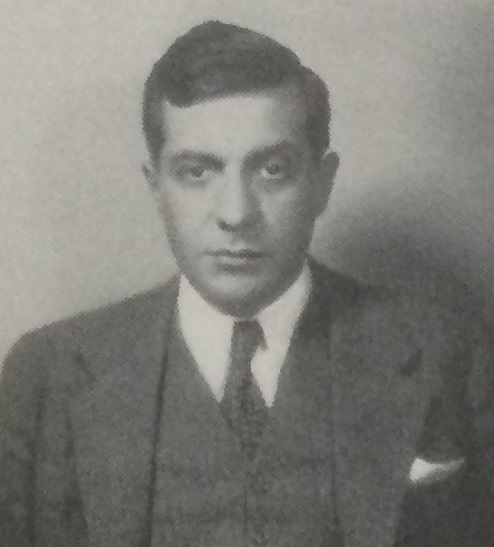
Vito Marcantonio (from 1949's Pictorial Directory of the 81st Congress) was an important political ally of Flaxer's

Flaxer was a social worker who in the early 1930s joined radical "Rank and File" movements like the Communist Party USA or the Socialist Party of America along with others like Mary van Kleeck, Jacob Fischer, Bertha Capen Reynolds, and Lewis Merrill.

Flaxer taught in a Bronx vocational school, at which time he also became an organizer for unemployed teachers. He joined the New York City Emergency Relief Bureau (ERB) and the Communist Party USA (CPUSA) and became ERB executive secretary. The growing ERB changed its name to the Association of Workers in Public Relief Agencies. Flaxer gained political relationships with New York City's Mayor Fiorello LaGuardia and Harlem-based Congressman Vito Marcantonio (and joined Marcantonio's American Labor Party). Flaxer helped form the American Federation of State, County and Municipal Employees (AFSCME) union, an American Federation of Labor (AFL) member.

In 1937, Flaxer broke with the AFSCME to form the New York-based State, County and Municipal Workers of America (SCMWA) union as member of the Congress of Industrial Organizations (CIO). The SCMWA represented local government workers. Flaxer became SCMWA's SCMWA's national president as well as member of the CIO's Executive Board. He became active in the National Municipal League and the Civil Service Assembly.

In 1939, Flaxer led SCMWA into an anti-war stance. He became a leader in the American Peace Mobilization group as a member of its national council.

In 1941, Flaxer reversed into a strong pro-war stance. That same year, Lewis G. Hines, secretary of the Commonwealth of Pennsylvania's Department of Labor and Industry stated that Flaxer had "been singled out on a number of occasions as one of the leader members of the Communist Party in this country." In 1941, SCMWA's membership reached 53,000 government employees.

During World War II, bitter infighting arose within SCMWA between pro- and anti-Communist groups. SCMWA also faced congressional scrutiny from the House Un-American Activities Committee (HUAC). In 1941 at a SCMWA convention, Flaxer said and, again in 1942, wrote in Survey Magazine that government employees should reserved the right to strike during war. In 1944, Flaxer was a four-page subject in a report by the United States House of Representatives. It noted he had been president of the SCMWA CIO since inception in 1937 and a Communist Party activist "as far back as 1936." He had been a "general manager" of the "American Federation of Government Employees" AFL, a member of which (John P. Frey) testified to his Communist links. He had headed the Association of Workers in Public Relief Agencies and joined with the "Communist-controlled" Workers Alliance (to request a parade permit). The report noted that the New York City Teachers Union had joined the SCMWA. As of 1944, his Popular Front memberships included the Committee on Election Rights, Prestes Defense Committee, Schappes Defense Committee, Reichstag Fire Trial Anniversary Committee, National Federation for Constitutional Liberties, American Committee for Protection of Foreign Born, American Committee to Save Refugees, United Spanish Aid Committee, Non-Partisan Committee for the Re-election of Congressman Vito Marcantonio, National Negro Congress, Public Use of Arts Committee, and National Council of American-Soviet Friendship.

In 1946, SCMWA and the UFWA merged to form the United Public Workers of America (UPWA). UPWA had an overtly pro-Soviet foreign policy, which contributed to a severe drop in members, who moved to rival AFSCME.

On January 26–28 and February 2, 1948, a hearing of the House Education and Labor Subcommittee, chaired by U.S. Representative Clare E. Hoffman, occurred on the topic of a strike by United Cafeteria and Restaurant Workers (Local 471) and its parent, the United Public Workers of America (UPWA), CIO, against Government Services, Inc. (GSI), which had already lasted nearly a month. Hoffman refused to let Flaxer read a statement and asked questions, including whether Flaxer was a communist. One of his UAW attorneys, Nathan Witt, objected to "abuse of congressional power." When another attorney, Joseph Forer, rose to follow on from Witt, Hoffman asked him, "Are you the same Forer who defended Gerhard Eisler?" When Witt objected to Hoffman's question, Hoffman ejected Witt from the hearing. On January 26, 1948, UPWA negotiations director Alfred Bernstein (father of Carl Bernstein), charged that House committee agents had raided the union's offices. During January, William S. Tyson, solicitor for the Labor Department, and Robert N. Denham, general counsel for the National Labor Relations Board, both agreed that nothing in the Taft-Hartley Act prohibited GSI from bargaining with a non-complying union. However, Denham added, the Act intended to "eliminate Communist influence from unions by denying to such unions the services of NLRB."

On November 24, 1948, Flaxer sent a letter to Truman decrying the tendency to brand a person disloyal simply because they advocated for improvements in civil rights.

In November 1949, attack on the UPWA culminated at a CIO convention. The CIO passed resolutions barring Communist Party members from holding leadership positions. CIO convention delegates then charged 10 unions, the UPWA among them, of being communist-controlled. A committee of anti-communist CIO vice presidents, chaired by Textile Workers Union of America President Emil Rieve, was established to try the union and (individually) Flaxer on the charges. The UPWA immediately ceased paying its member dues to the CIO, and denounced the committee as biased due to the strong anti-communist feelings of its members. As the trial approached in January 1950, the UPWA issued a lengthy document which purported to show that it had not parroted the Communist Party line and had upheld the CIO political platform. When the informal trial opened on January 9, the UPWA attempted to bring more than 250 witnesses in its defense, but the crowd was barred on the grounds it would intimidate the committee. At the hearing, Transport Workers Union of America President and communist Mike Quill (who had broken with the Communist Party USA some years earlier but not abandoned his communist beliefs), testified that Flaxer had coordinated his organizing efforts and criticism of the CIO with CPUSA leaders.

The CIO executive board on February 16, 1950, voted 34-to-2 to expel the UPWA. On March 1, 1950, the CIO expelled UPWA in a purge of Communist dominated unions. On August 8, 1951, Flaxer's ex-wife Vivian White Soboleski testified that Flaxer had been a Communist Party member and that he had joined in 1935. On August 23, 1951, Louis F. Budenz testified that he had known Flaxer (as well as Alfred Bernstein, father of journalist Carl Bernstein) as a Communist Party member from 1940 to 1945 (when Budenz left the Party). On October 5, 1951, Flaxer appeared with David Rein as counsel. In February 1953, the UPWA dissolved.

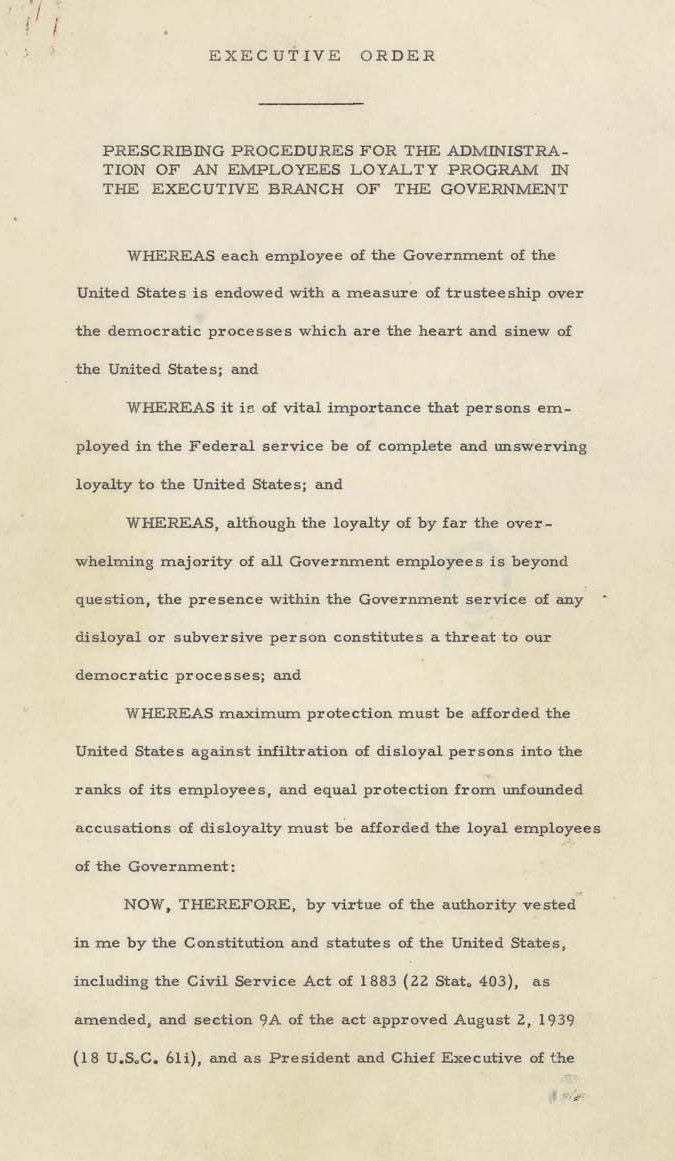
Flaxer joined many radicals in opposing Executive Order 9835, signed by US President Harry S. Truman in 1947 (here, page 1)

Flaxer opposed anti-subversive (anti-communist) witch-hunts. He debated US Representative Richard Nixon on the radio regarding the federal loyalty program under Executive Order 9835. By 1950, he found himself accused of CPUSA membership. On October 5, 1951, Flaxer appeared before the United States Senate Subcommittee on Internal Security (SSIS) but refused to name names on the UPWA membership list. On October 6, 1953, he was found guilty by jury of contempt of Congress and sentence to two months in jail plus a $1,000 fine. On June 21, 1956, a Federal Court of Appeals upheld Flaxer's conviction; David Rein defended Flaxer, helped by Joseph Forer. In 1958, David Rein (partner of Joseph Forer) defended in Flaxer v. United States, 358 U.S. 147 [1958]), which ruled in Flaxer's favor.

== Personal life and death ==
In June 1928, Flaxer married Victoria White of Exeter, New Hampshire; they stayed married "exactly ten years." Some time after 1940, Flaxer married Charlotte Rosswaag, who served in the SCMWA as a welfare investigator as well as chair of its Lower Manhattan subgroup.

Flaxer had a bank account at the Emigrant Savings Bank (listed in 1951 testimony as the "Immigrant Savings Industrial Bank"), as well as the Corn Exchange Bank, East River Savings Bank, and Bankers Trust.

Abram Flaxer died on January 11, 1989.

== Works ==
Abram Flaxer wrote an unpublished memoir, A View from the Left Field Bleachers.

== See also ==
- Flaxer v. United States, 358 U.S. 147 [1958]
- State, County, and Municipal Workers of America (SCMWA)
- United Federal Workers of America (UFWA)
- United Public Workers of America (UPWA)
- Arthur Stein
- Alfred Bernstein
- Herbert Fuchs
- David Rein
- Joseph Forer
