= Rita Walters =

American politician (1930–2020)

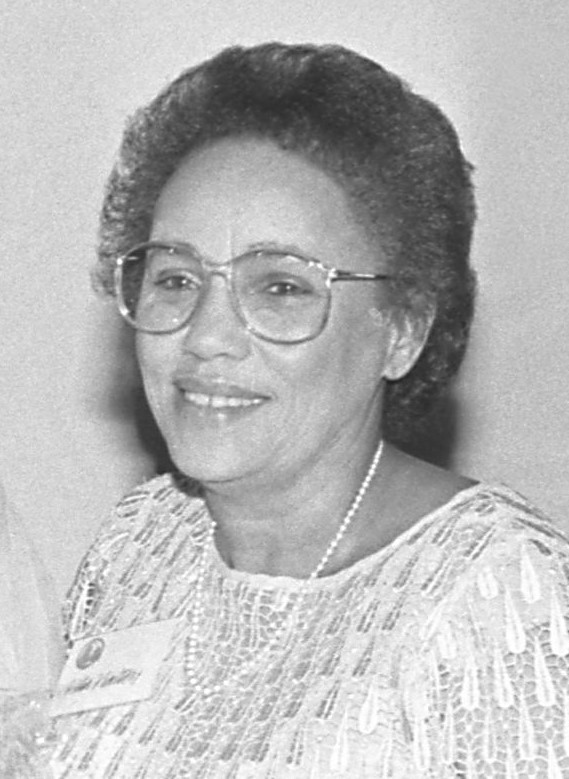
- Walters in 1986

Member of the Los Angeles City Council from the 9th District
- In office July 1, 1991 – June 30, 2001
- Preceded by: Gilbert W. Lindsay
- Succeeded by: Jan Perry

Personal details
- Born: Rita Dolores White; August 14, 1930 Chicago, Illinois
- Died: February 17, 2020 (aged 89) Los Angeles, California
- Party: Democratic
- Spouse: Wilbur E. Walters (m. 1955, div. 1973)
- Children: 3
- Education: Shaw University; UCLA Anderson School of Management

Rita Dolores Walters (née White; August 14, 1930 – February 17, 2020) was an American politician.

== Political career ==
Walters served on the Board of Library Commissioners for the Los Angeles Public Library. Prior to this position, she served on the Los Angeles City Council representing the 9th district from 1991 to 2001. During that time, she chaired the Arts, Health & Humanities Committee where she reviewed matters related to the Library Department. She was the first African-American woman elected to the City Council. Prior to this job, she was on the Los Angeles Unified School District's Board of Education (1979–1991). Walters was also a teacher in the adult division of the Los Angeles School District for four years.

== Background ==
Walters was born in Chicago, Illinois, and moved with her parents and family to Kansas. She moved to Los Angeles in 1955, and there she met and married Wilbur E. Walters. They had three children: David, Susan, and Philip. She died in Los Angeles while in hospice care from Alzheimer's disease.

== Education ==
Walters graduated with a bachelor's degree in education from Shaw University and had an MBA from the UCLA Anderson School of Management.

== Recognition ==
In 2009, Walters was recognized on the popular podcast, 'Vaguely Live Radio', as part of the feature 'Jimmy's Random Wikipedia Page of the Week'.

Preceded by Gilbert W. Lindsay	Los Angeles City Council; 9th District; 1991–2001	Succeeded by Jan Perry
