= Walter Galenson =

American economist (1914–1999)

Walter Galenson (1914 – December 30, 1999) was a professor of economics at Cornell University and a noted U.S. labor historian and economist.

== Education and early career ==
He received his bachelor's degree in 1934, his Master of Science in 1935 and his Ph.D. in 1940—all from Columbia University.

During World War II, Galenson was an economist United States Department of War. He was the principal economist for the department from 1942 to 1943. He then became principal economist at the Office of Strategic Services (the forerunner to the CIA) from 1943 to 1944. After the war, Galenson was a labor attaché at the American embassies in Norway and Denmark from 1945 to 1946.

== Academic career ==
Galenson received an appointment as an assistant professor of economics at Harvard University in 1946. He left Harvard in 1951 to teach economics at the University of California, Berkeley, where, from 1957 to 1961, he was chair of the Center for Chinese Studies. He left Berkeley in 1965, one of many prominent academics who left after being accused of being too conservative, and took a position as a visiting professor of economics at Cornell University.

Galenson became increasingly active in labor and Third World economic development issues, and from 1961 to 1971, he served as a consultant to the International Labour Organization (ILO). He served as the U.S. delegate to the ILO in 1972 and again in 1976.

In 1966, Galenson joined the faculty at Cornell permanently as a professor of economics; in 1976, he was appointed Jacob Gould Schurman Professor of Economics. In 1970, Galenson spent an academic year as Pitt Professor of American History and Institutions at Cambridge University in the United Kingdom. He was the first non-historian to hold the post. While teaching at Cambridge, he was awarded a second master's degree in 1971.

From 1971 to 1972, Galenson served as a consultant in economic development to the government of Indonesia. In 1974, Galenson was appointed a visiting professor of economics at University of Gothenburg, Sweden.

== Personal life ==
He married, and he and his wife Marjorie (also a professor of economics) had a son, David Galenson, and two daughters. Galenson retired from teaching in 1990, and died in his sleep on December 30, 1999, in Washington, D.C.

== Research work ==
Galenson's research focused on labor history, comparative labor studies, labor economics, and the economics of development in emerging markets.

Galenson's primary reputation was based on his work in comparative labor economics. He made the first serious study by a Westerner of labor productivity in the Soviet Union. In the late 1950s and early 1960s, he directed a large research project, financed by the Ford Foundation, on the economic development of the Chinese economy—one of the first studies of the modernization of the Chinese economy and its effect on surrounding nations. His 1964 book, The Quality of Labour and Economic Development in Certain Countries: A Preliminary Study, was a pioneering study of how the living conditions of people in the Third World affected economic development in industrialized nations. Galenson was also internationally recognized as an expert on trade unionism and economics in Scandinavia.

However, Galenson's work as a labor historian was significant. His 1960 book, The CIO Challenge to the AFL: A History of the American Labor Movement, is still cited as one of the fundamental works in the field. Galenson promoted the view that the Taft-Hartley Act and the anti-communism of the 1950s sundered the coalition labor had with political leftists, and contributed significantly to the decline of the labor movement. The view, controversial at the time, is widely adopted today. Galenson is also one of the few labor historians to study the history of the American labor movement in the post-AFL-CIO merger era. His 1996 work, The American Labor Movement, 1955–1995, covers the AFL-CIO's efforts in the 1960s, 1970s, and 1980s—a largely neglected period of labor history.

His 1981 study of the U.S. policy toward the International Labour Organization remains the most valuable work on that topic.

== Awards and memberships ==
In 1950, Galenson was named a Fulbright fellow. In 1954, he was awarded a Guggenheim Fellowship in economics. Galenson was a member of the American Philological Association. He was also a member of the Association for Comparative Economic Studies, and served as that organization's president in 1973.

== Published works ==
=== Solely authored books ===
- Labor in Norway. New York City: Russell & Russell, 1949.
- The Danish System of Labor Relations: A Study in Industrial Peace. Cambridge, Massachusetts: Harvard University Press, 1952.
- Labor Productivity in Soviet and American Industry. Columbia University Press, 1955.
- The CIO Challenge to the AFL: A History of the American Labor Movement. Cambridge, Massachusetts: Harvard University Press, 1960. ISBN 0-674-13150-9
- Trade Union Democracy in Western Europe. Berkeley, Calif.: University of California Press, 1961.
- The Quality of Labour and Economic Development in Certain Countries: A Preliminary Study. Geneva, Switzerland: International Labour Office, 1964.
- The International Labor Organization: An American View. 1st ed. Madison, Wisc.: University of Wisconsin Press, 1981. ISBN 0-299-08544-9
- The United Brotherhood of Carpenters: The First Hundred Years. 1st ed. Cambridge, Massachusetts: Harvard University Press, 1983. ISBN 0-674-92196-8
- Trade Union Growth and Decline: An International Study. 1st ed. Westport, Conn.: Praeger Publishers, 1994. ISBN 0-275-94325-9
- The American Labor Movement, 1955–1995. Westport, Conn.: Greenwood Press, 1996. ISBN 0-313-29677-4
- The World's Strongest Trade Unions: The Scandinavian Labor Movement. Westport, Conn.: Greenwood Press, 1998. ISBN 1-56720-183-0

=== Co-authored books ===
- Adams, John Clarke and Galenson, Walter. Comparative Labor Movements. New York City: Prentice Hall, 1952.
- Galenson, Walter and Lipset, Seymour Martin. Labor and Trade Unionism: An Interdisciplinary Reader. New York City: John Wiley & Sons, Inc., 1960.

=== Solely edited books ===
- Comparative Labor Movements. Galenson, Walter, ed. 2nd ed. New York City: Russell & Russell Publishers, 1968. ISBN 0-8462-1064-9
- Foreign Trade and Investment. Economic Development in the Newly Industrializing Countries. Galenson, Walter, ed. University of Wisconsin Press, 1985. ISBN 9780299101008

=== Co-edited books ===
- Dunlop, John T. and Galenson, Walter, eds. Labor in the Twentieth Century. New York: Academic Press, 1978. ISBN 0-12-224350-1
