= Political Repression in Modern America =

2001 history book by Robert Justin Goldstein

Political Repression in Modern America from 1870 to 1976
- Author: Robert Justin Goldstein
- Language: English
- Genre: History
- Publisher: University of Illinois Press
- Publication date: 2001
- Publication place: United States
- ISBN: 0-252-02653-5

Political Repression in Modern America from 1870 to 1976 is an historical account by Robert Justin Goldstein of significant civil liberties violations concerning American political dissidents since 1870 – a date demarcating the close of the Civil War decade and the development of the modern American industrial state. It was first published in 2001.

== Reviews ==
- Review Contemporary Sociology (and again)
- Review in the Journal of Politics
- Review in International Affairs
- Review in Labour
- Review in The Journal of American History
- Review in The American Historical Review
