= National Federation of Federal Employees =

American labor organization

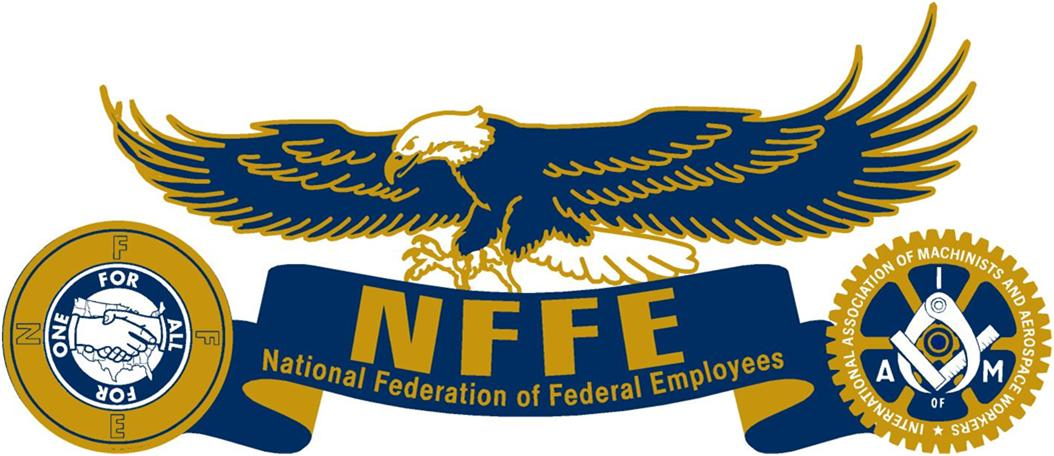
- Founded: September 17, 1917
- Headquarters: Washington, D.C.
- Location: United States
- Members: 9,715 (2025)
- National President: Randy Erwin
- Affiliations: International Association of Machinists and Aerospace Workers, AFL–CIO
- Website: nffe.org

The National Federation of Federal Employees (NFFE) is an American labor union which represents about 100,000 public employees in the federal government.

NFFE has about 200 local unions, most of them agency-wide bargaining units. Its members work primarily in the Department of Defense, the Forest Service, the Department of Veterans Affairs, the General Services Administration, the National Park Service, the Army Corps of Engineers, the Department of Housing and Urban Development, and the Passport Services division of the Bureau of Consular Affairs (Department of State).

== Formation ==
Workers in federal agencies had formed craft-based unions on the local level beginning in the early 1880s. Unions representing letter carriers and railway postal clerks won passage in 1888 of federal legislation mandating an eight-hour day for postal workers. In 1898, these two unions—with the support of the Knights of Labor and the American Federation of Labor—pushed for legislation revising federal postal salaries as well. Although the effort was unsuccessful, a union of postal clerks organized in 1900.

The growing power of these and other unions in the federal government led President Theodore Roosevelt to issue Executive order 163 on January 31, 1902, banning federal workers from "individually or through associations, [soliciting] an increase of pay, or to influence or to attempt to influence in their own interest any legislation whatever, either before Congress or its Committees, or in any way save through the heads of the Departments in or under which they serve, on penalty of dismissal from the government service." This Executive Order was expanded by Roosevelt on January 26, 1906, to include the independent agencies as well. On November 26, 1908, Roosevelt dramatically widened the extent of the Executive Order to include military personnel, expanded the kind of information which could not be communicated, and banned other actions by employees.

Under Congressional pressure, President William H. Taft made the Executive Order less onerous. On April 8, 1912, Taft amended the order to permit federal workers to communicate with Congress, but required them to do so through their supervisors and department heads.

Unhappy with Taft's refusal to rescind the order entirely, Congress passed the Lloyd-La Follette Act (§6, 37 Stat. 555, 5 U.S.C. § 7511) on August 24, 1912, declaring that "the right of persons employed in the civil service of the United States, either individually or collectively, to petition Congress or any member thereof or to furnish information to either House of Congress or to any committee thereof, shall not be denied or interfered with."

The Lloyd-La Follette Act provided a significant impetus to the formation federal employees' unions. In 1916, the American Federation of Labor (AFL) acted to bring the various local unions together to form a single national union. The National Federation of Federal Employees was founded in Washington, D.C., on September 17, 1917. In 1918, it became the first labor union to win the legal right to represent federal workers.

== History ==
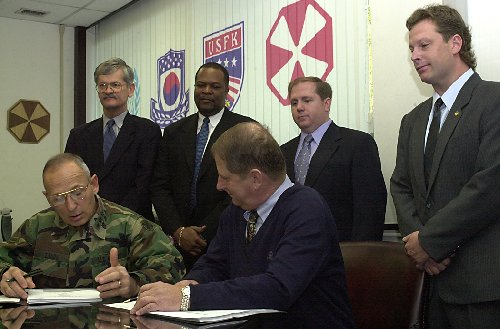
Dennis G. Bue (seated, right), president of Local 1363 of the National Federation of Federal Employees, signing a labor-management agreement with Lt. Gen. Daniel R. Zanini (seated, left), Commander, 8th Army, in South Korea on October 31, 2002.

NFFE grew quickly. For example, by 1929 it had organized more than 1,500 workers at the Bureau of Engraving and Printing. The unit was the largest NFFE chapter in the country, the largest local union in the country, and the largest women's union in the country. NFFE also quickly abandoned its craft focus. Some local chapters—especially those in large federal agencies in Washington, D.C., where the number of workers enabled craft-based bargaining units to remain viable—retained their craft structure. But most of the union's units throughout the country became industrial unions. Even many of the D.C.-area unions abandoned their craft orientation to become industrial unions with agency-wide bargaining units.

The significance of the Bureau of Engraving and Printing local was not lost on NFFE. NFFE became a strong advocate for women's rights, and elected a woman, Florence Etheridge, as the chair of its first national council.

NFFE relied heavily on the provisions of the Lloyd–La Follette Act as the basis for its operations. Much of the union's focus was on legislative action. For example, it began advocating for a formal federal job classification system and uniform rates of compensation in 1919. These efforts paid off: The same year, Congress established the Joint Congressional Committee on the Reclassification of Salaries. In 1923, NFFE won passage of the Classification Act, which established uniform, nationwide compensation levels and tied them to the duties and responsibilities of job positions.

In 1931, NFFE disaffiliated from the American Federation of Labor. The break occurred over the AFL's refusal to abandon its support for craft unionism and cease its attacks on industrial unions. NFFE disaffiliated in December 1931. The AFL responded by chartering a new federal employees union, the American Federation of Government Employees (AFGE), on October 17, 1932.

In 1962, President John F. Kennedy signed Executive Order 10988, establishing the right of federal workers to engage in collective bargaining. Consequently, union membership among U.S. government employees soared from 13 percent in 1961 to 60 percent in the 1974. NFFE's membership also grew tremendously, roughly doubling during the same period from 80,000 members to 150,000 members.

In 1963, NFFE was one of the foremost proponents of the Equal Pay Act.

NFFE became embroiled in a major legal fight with the Reagan administration. In August 1987, the Reagan administration issued civil service rules requiring all federal workers to sign a new secrecy pledge, Standard Form 189. Administration officials said the new form was designed merely to reinforce the need to maintain the security of those documents classified as top secret. But NFFE filed a lawsuit on August 17, 1987, challenging the constitutionality of the secrecy pledge. In May 1988, a U.S. District Court ruled in National Federation of Federal Employees v. United States (688 F. Supp. 671) that Standard Form 189 was constitutional. The NFFE and other plaintiffs appealed to the U.S. Supreme Court. In July 1988, the District Court further held in National Federation of Federal Employees v. United States (695 F. Supp. 1196) that certain terms in Standard Form 189 needed additional clarification by the executive branch. NFFE appealed this ruling to the U.S. Court of Appeals for the District of Columbia Circuit. Meanwhile, in September 1988, the federal government issued Standard Form 312 as a replacement for Standard Form 189. The new form expunged much of the objectionable language which had so deeply concerned NFFE and other unions. On April 18, 1989, the Supreme Court held in American Foreign Service Association v. Garfinkel, 490 U.S. 153, that the issuance of Standard Form 312 may have resolved the conflict. The Supreme Court remanded the case back to the District Court to resolve any outstanding issues. The Court of Appeals for the District of Columbia Circuit also remanded the second NFFE lawsuit to District Court. In March 1990, the District Court dismissed the remaining issues in its ruling in American Foreign Service Association v. Garfinkel, 732 F. Supp. 13), and NFFE dropped any further attempts to revive the suit.

In 1999, NFFE affiliated with the International Association of Machinists and Aerospace Workers (IAM), an AFL–CIO/CLC trade union representing over 600,000 workers as of 2024 in more than 200 industries with most of its membership in the United States and Canada.

== Presidents ==
- Howard Marion McLarin, September 24, 1917 – June 30, 1918
- Luther Corwin Steward, September 1, 1918 – August 19, 1955
- Michael E. Markwood, September 1, 1955 – January 27, 1957
- Vaux Owen, January 29, 1957 – September 30, 1964
- Nathan Tully Wolkomir, October 1, 1964 – October 31, 1976
- James Monroe Peirce, Jr., November 1, 1976 – October 31, 1990
- Sheila K. Velazco, November 1, 1990 – October 31, 1992
- Robert Scott Keener, November 1, 1992 – January 2, 1994
- Sheila K. Velazco, January 3, 1994 – October 31, 1994
- Louis Jasmine, November 1, 1994 – September 8, 1995
- Sonya Constaine, September 9, 1995 – October 1, 1995
- Robert Eugene Estep, Jr., October 2, 1995 – May 2, 1996
- Gary Wayne Divine, May 3, 1996 – October 31, 1996
- James Doyle Cunningham, November 1, 1996 – February 21, 1998
- Albert Schmidt, February 22, 1998 – October 31, 1998
- Richard N. Brown, November 1, 1998 – June 30, 2009 (deceased)
- William Dougan, July 1, 2009 – 2016
- Randy L. Erwin, December 1, 2016 – present
