= Belarusian Orthodox Parish in Vilnius =

Orthodox Parish

Belarusian Orthodox Community of the Ecumenical Patriarchate in Vilnius in Honour of the Annunciation of the Virgin Mary
- Type: Parish
- Location: Vilnius, Bokšto g. 4
- Key people: Archpriest Heorhij Roj, Priest Aliaksandr Kukhta

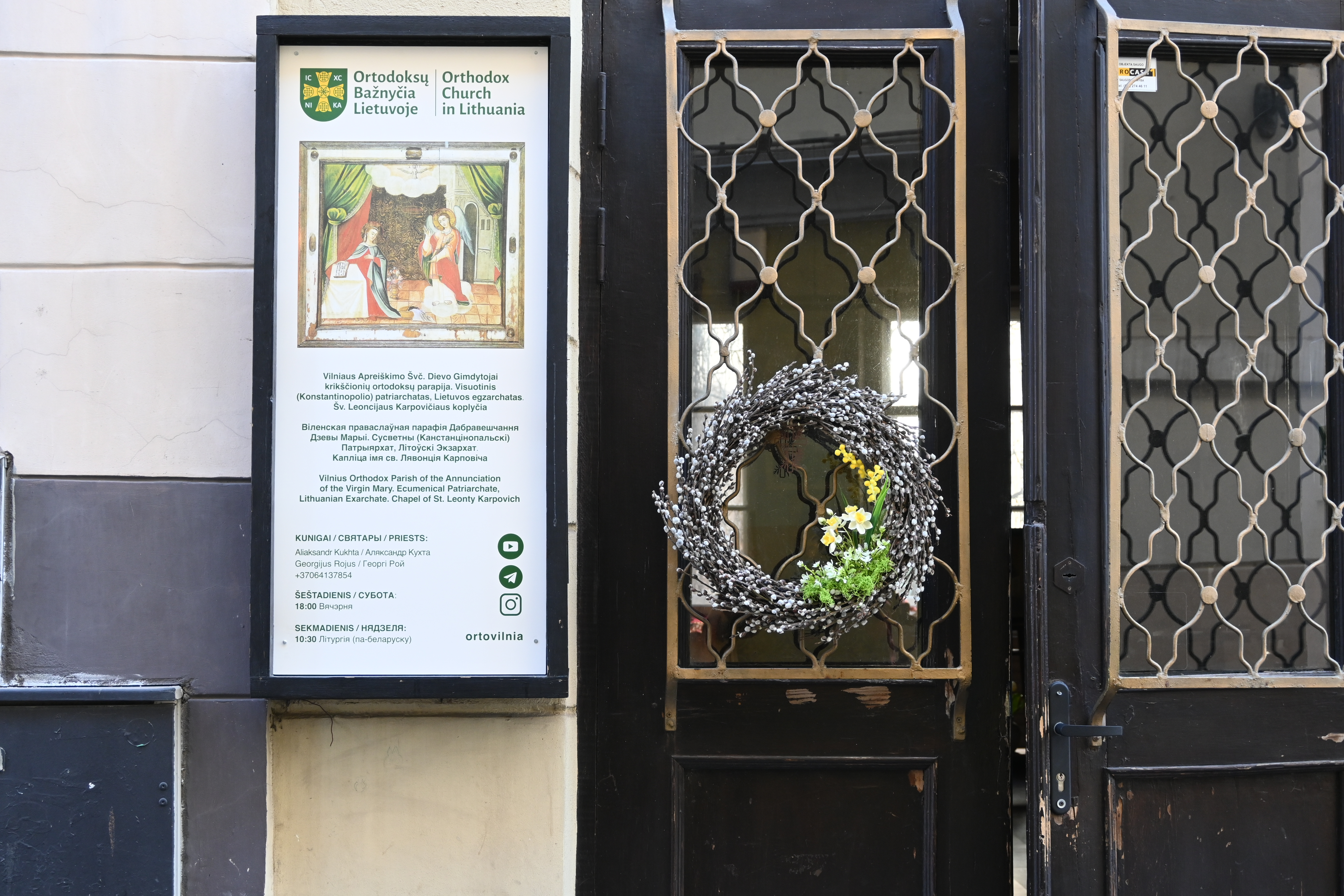
Entrance to the church of the Belarusian Orthodox community in Vilnius

The Belarusian Orthodox Community of the Ecumenical Patriarchate of Constantinople in Vilnius in Honour of the Annunciation of the Virgin Mary is a Belarusian Orthodox parish under the jurisdiction of the Ecumenical Patriarchate of Constantinople. It was founded in 2023 in Vilnius, Lithuania, by priests of the Belarusian Orthodox Church who were forced to leave Belarus because of political persecution. The liturgical life of the community is conducted entirely in the Belarusian language.

Vilnius, Bokšto g. 4

== History ==
The preconditions for the creation of the community were the events connected with the political crisis in Belarus and the beginning of the Russian military aggression against Ukraine. Belarusian priests Archpriest Heorhij Roj and Priest Aliaksandr Kukhta, known as the author of the video blog Batiushka adkaža, publicly condemned the violence of 2020 and the war in 2022. Because of pressure from the authorities and the threat of criminal prosecution, they were forced to emigrate to Lithuania. Since the leadership of the Russian Orthodox Church supported the war, the priests could not, for moral reasons, remain under the jurisdiction of the Moscow Patriarchate.

Since the Russian Orthodox Church had previously broken eucharistic communion with Constantinople, a transfer between jurisdictions according to the standard procedure with a letter of release was impossible. In April 2023, the priests appealed to Patriarch Bartholomew I of Constantinople with a request to receive them under his omophorion. On 6 April 2023, the Ecumenical Patriarchate, acting as the highest court of appeal, officially received them into its jurisdiction without letters of release.

The leadership of the Belarusian Exarchate did not recognize this transfer. On 11 April 2023, Metropolitan Veniamin of Minsk and Archbishop Antonii of Hrodna and Vaŭkavysk issued decrees banning Heorhij Roj and Aliaksandr Kukhta from ministry within the territory of the Belarusian Orthodox Church.

== Development and activities ==
The first service of the Belarusian parish of the Ecumenical Patriarchate took place on the night of 16 April 2023, at Easter. It was held in a Lutheran church in Vilnius and gathered about 150 people, including the Lithuanian chargé d'affaires in Belarus, Asta Andrijauskienė. During the service, the choir performed the Belarusian spiritual hymn Mahutny Boža, and prayers were offered for the swift end of war and repression.

In February 2024, the Ministry of Justice of Lithuania officially registered the Orthodox Church of Lithuania of the Ecumenical Patriarchate as a traditional religious denomination, which gave it the right to receive state funding and to teach religion in schools. The exarchate was headed by the Estonian hieromonk Justinus. In total, the new structure included ten priests and ten local Orthodox communities, including the Belarusian community.

The liturgical life of the community is conducted entirely in the Belarusian language. For worship, the parish uses translations made by Belarusian Greek Catholics and Father Aliaksandr Nadson. In addition, the community, together with the initiative Christian Vision, is working on its own Orthodox translation of liturgical texts into Belarusian. On 25 December 2023, the parish celebrated Christmas according to the New Julian calendar for the first time, together with most of the local Orthodox churches of the world.

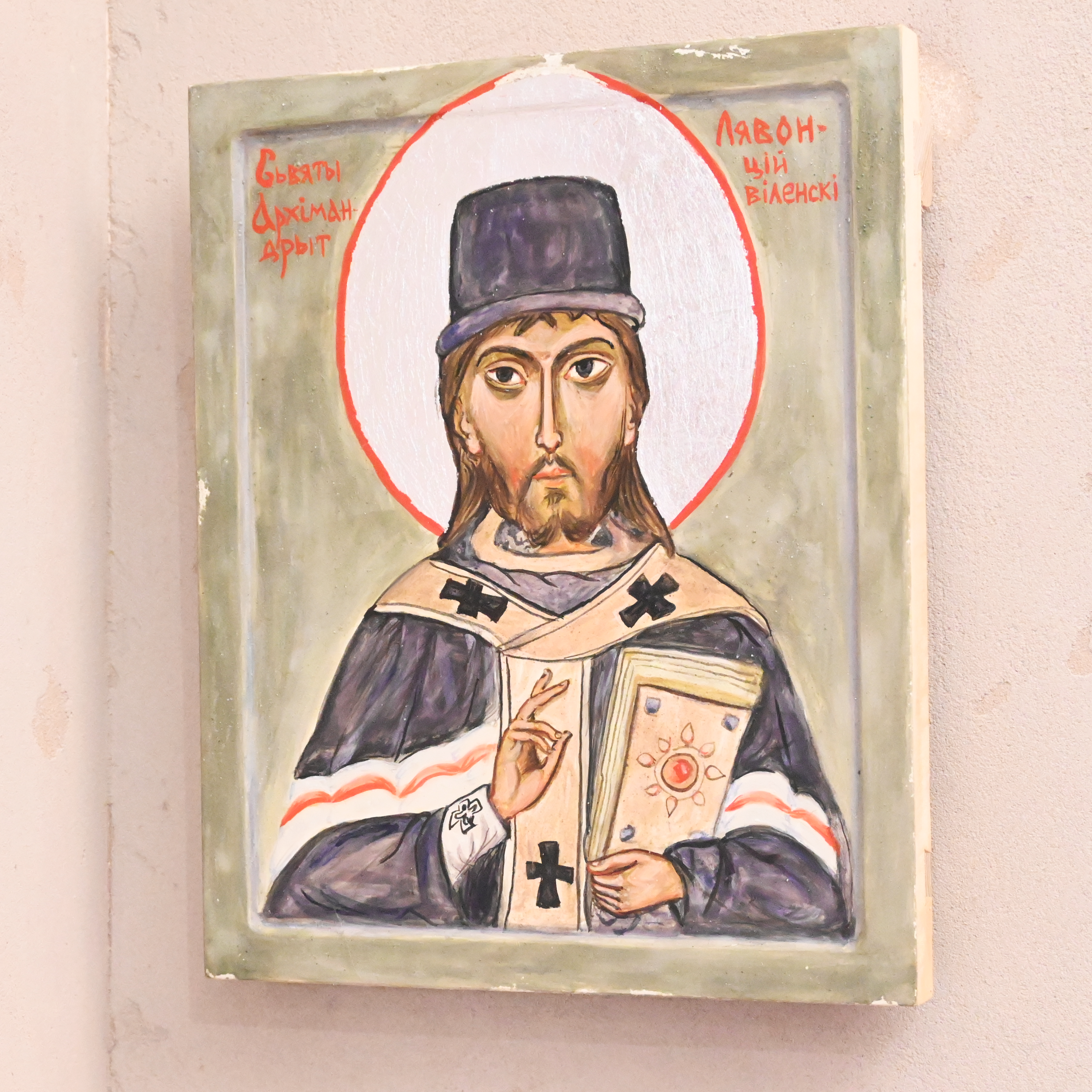
Icon of Liavońcij Karpovič by Ksisha Angelava

The services of the Belarusian Orthodox community in Vilnius are held in a church dedicated to Saint Liavońcij Karpovič and located on Bokšto Street (Bokšto g. 4). Festive services were also held in the Reformed Church and in the Church of St. Nicholas in Lukiškės. The priests plan to establish a Sunday school, a development centre for children, and social projects for Belarusians abroad.

The Belarusian parish in Vilnius is engaged in research and volunteer care for Belarusian graves at the Saint Euphrosyne Cemetery in Vilnius. Thanks to the efforts of the parish community, dozens of graves have been rediscovered. Every year, on Dziady and Radunitsa, volunteers clean and improve the graves of Belarusian figures at Lipówka Cemetery.

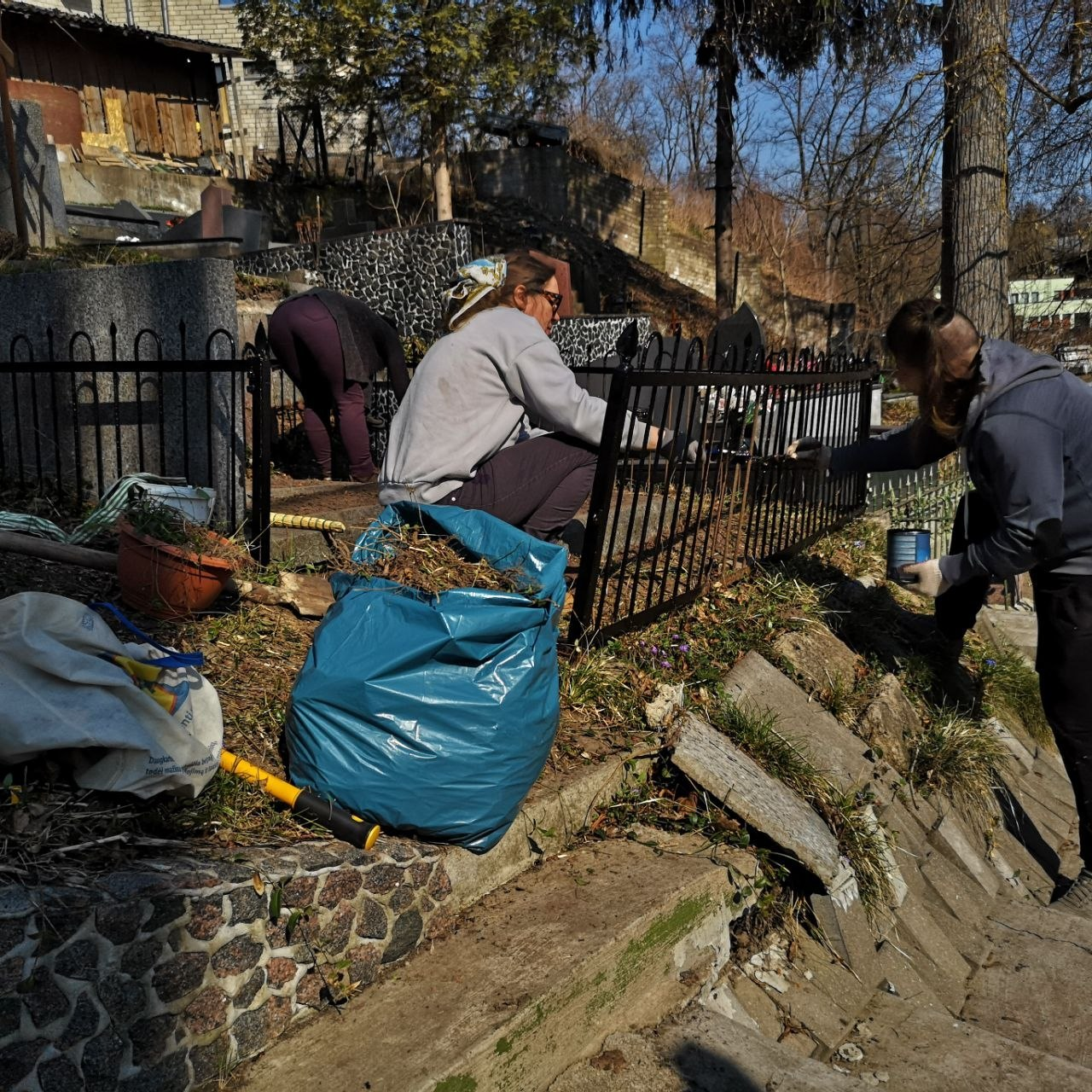
Improvement works at the grave of Usiaslau Bildziukievich

In 2026, on the eve of the celebration of Freedom Day in Vilnius, parishioners rediscovered the grave of the Belarusian Orthodox activist of the interwar period, Usiaslau Bildziukievich. Immediately afterwards, funds were raised and volunteers joined the effort to restore the fence and clean the site.

== Clergy ==
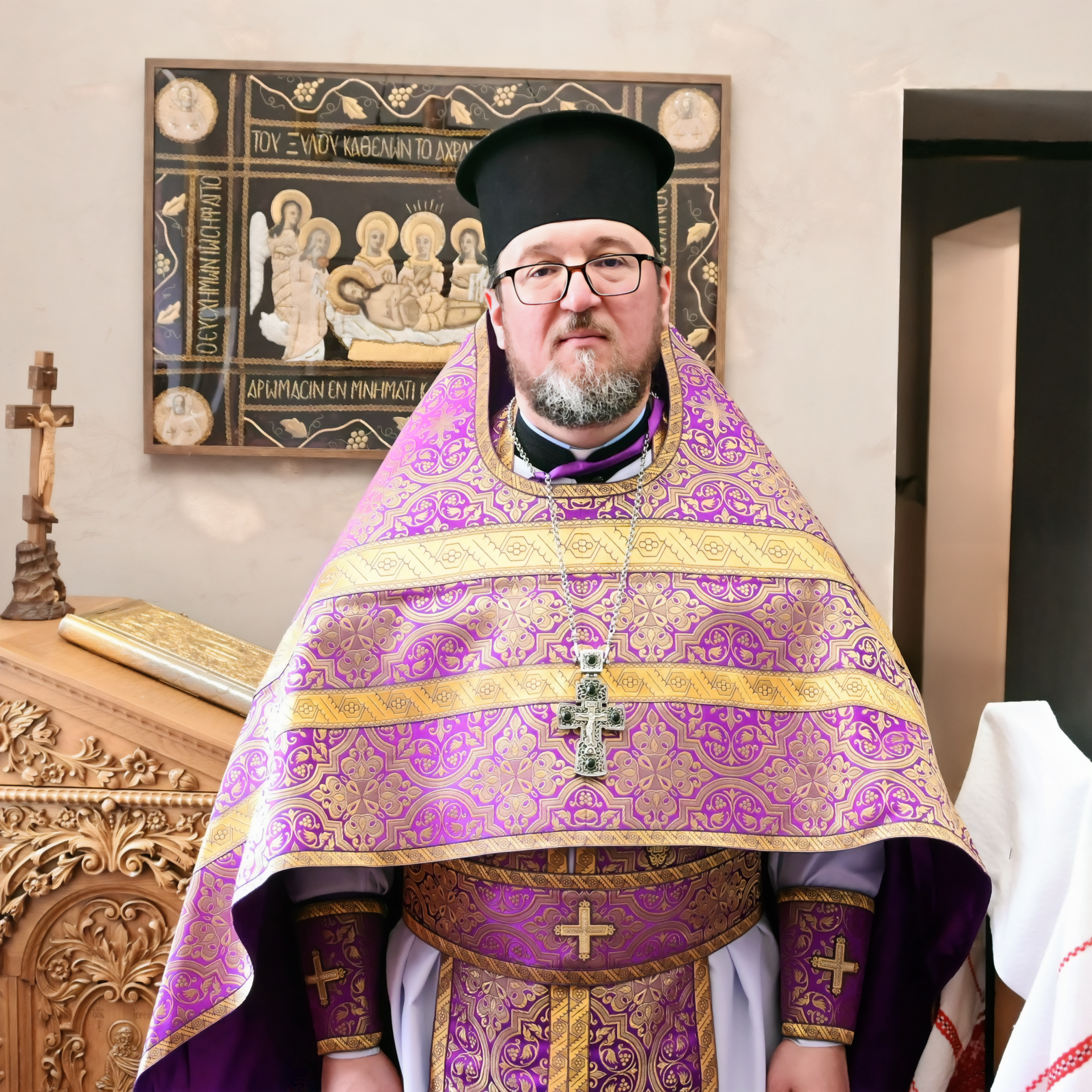
Fr. Heorhij Roj

As of early 2026, the spiritual care of the Belarusian Orthodox community in Vilnius was provided by two priests: Archpriest Heorhij Roj and Priest Aliaksandr Kukhta.

== Incidents ==
In early September 2024, the premises of the Belarusian Orthodox parish in Vilnius were subjected to an act of vandalism. During the night, unknown perpetrators shot at the church windows with air guns, damaging the glass. Following the incident, the Lithuanian police opened an investigation, and the faithful organized a fundraiser to repair the window.

This attack coincided with a series of other provocations against the Belarusian political emigration. Within the same twenty-four hours, windows were smashed in the Belarusian Community and Culture Centre, and insulting graffiti appeared near the office of the charitable organization Dapamoha.

The Lithuanian Ministry of Foreign Affairs strongly condemned these acts of vandalism against the Belarusian community, officially stating that they had been committed according to the “playbook” of the KGB, and assured that those responsible would be brought to justice. Representatives of the Belarusian democratic forces and human rights defenders also noted that the incident fit into a broader pattern of informational and physical provocations, including those related to the artificial fuelling of the conflict over “Litvinism”, organized by the special services of the Lukashenko regime and Russia in order to discredit the emigration and sow division between Belarusians and Lithuanians.
