= Arthur Stein (activist) =

- Born: circa 1907
- Died: unknown
- Known for: co-founding United Federal Workers of America (UFWA)
- Political party: Communist Party USA
- Spouse: Annie Steckler (Annie Stein) (m. 1933)
- Children: Eleanor Raskin
- Relatives: Thai Jones

Arthur Stein was an American union leader, co-founder of the United Federal Workers of America (UFWA), and some-time member of the Communist Party USA who led communist cells within the US federal government during the later 1930s and into the 1940s.

== Background ==
Arthur Stein's father Charles came from the shtetl of Mazritch (Międzyrzec Podlaski?) in Poland. He studied at the Evander Childs High School in The Bronx.

== Career ==
Stein joined the Communist Party some time in the late 1920s or early 1930s, and co-organized the 1932 Chicago Counter-Olympics (also known as the International Workers Athletic Meet, the first Olympic counter-protest). He later was an employee at the Works Progress Administration and then the War Production Board.

Arthur Stein had helped co-found the United Federal Workers of America or UFWA (one of the two predecessor unions of the United Public Workers of America or UPWA), was elected president of its Works Progress Administration local, and later worked as a full-time organizer for the UPWA. In 1937, he helped organize a secret cell of the Party within a subcommittee of the Senate Committee on Interstate and Foreign Commerce, and later at the National Labor Relations Board.

On February 23, 1943, Stein testified before a subcommittee of the House Committee on the Civil Service as assistant to secretary-treasurer, United Federal Workers of America, Congress of Industrial Organizations (now part of the United States House Committee on Oversight and Reform) regarding additional compensation for civilian employees.

In January–February 1944, Stein testified before a subcommittee of the Senate Committee on Education and Labor (now United States Senate Committee on Health, Education, Labor and Pensions) regarding salaries of government employees. In December 1944, a House Miscellaneous report listed names and union affiliations of "110 leaders of the work in which the C.I.O Political Action Committee" engaged with the National Federal for Constitutional Liberties. It listed Stein as "assistant to secretary-treasurer, United Federal Workers of America."

== Espionage ==
In December 1955, Herbert Fuchs testified under subpoena before House Committee on Un-American Activities (HUAC) and described Arthur Stein as a recurring leader in underground networks in the federal government. In 1936, when Fuchs moved to Washington, DC, and joined the Wheeler Committee. Arthur Stein led the committee's communist members. They included: James Gorham, Samuel Koenigsberg, Ellis Olim, and Margaret Bennett Porter (wife of John W. Porter). When Fuchs moved to the National Labor Relations Board, his comrades were: again Arthur Stein, Allan Rosenberg, Martin Kurasch, Joseph Robison, Eleanor Nelson, Henry Rhine, Philip Reno, Sidney Katz, Julia Katz, and Bernard Stern. Fuchs named Victor Perlo as Party dues collector at the NLRB; Arthur Stein succeeded him.

== Personal life and death ==
On August 12, 1933, Stein married Annie Steckler.

Their daughter Eleanor Raskin joined the Students for a Democratic Society and become a leader in the Weather Underground group. (Eleanor would marry fellow Weatherman Jeff Jones in 1981; their son Thai Jones is a nationally known journalist.)

== Works ==
- Stein, Arthur (March 1947). "The Fate of the Sudeten Germans: The Destruction of a People". The New International: 79–83.

== See also ==
- Annie Stein
- Eleanor Raskin
- Herbert Fuchs
- Milton Galamison
