= Freedom Day =

Freedom Day may refer to any of the following days:

== National and international ==
=== United States ===
- Juneteenth on 19 June in the United States, also known as Freedom Day, commemorating the day in 1865 when Union troops arrived in Galveston, Texas, announcing the end of slavery
- National Freedom Day on 1 February in the United States, to honor the signing by Abraham Lincoln of a joint House and Senate resolution that later became the 13th Amendment to the U.S. Constitution
- National Religious Freedom Day on 16 January in the United States, to commemorate the adoption of Thomas Jefferson's landmark Virginia Statute for Religious Freedom in 1786
- World Freedom Day (United States) on 9 November in the United States, to commemorate the fall of the Berlin Wall in 1989

=== Other countries ===
- Freedom Day (Belarus) on 25 March in Belarus, anniversary of the establishment of the Belarusian People's Republic in 1918
- Freedom Day in Equatorial Guinea on 3 August, see Public holidays in Equatorial Guinea
- Freedom Day in Malawi on 14 June, anniversary of the first free election in Malawi in 1994; see Public holidays in Malawi
- Freedom Day (Malta) on 31 March, anniversary of the withdrawal of British troops from Malta, 1979
- Freedom Day (Portugal) on 25 April, anniversary of Carnation Revolution in Portugal, 1974
- Freedom Day (South Africa) on 27 April, anniversary of the first general election in South Africa after the end of apartheid in 1994
- Freedom Day (Ukraine) on 22 January in Ukraine, anniversary of the signing of the Act Zluky by the Ukrainian People's Republic and the West Ukrainian People's Republic in 1919
- World Freedom Day on 23 January in Taiwan and South Korea to mark the return of ex-communist war prisoners of the Korean War

== Local, regional, and informal days ==
=== United States ===
- Liberation and Freedom Day, 3 March, commemorating the day in 1865 when Union troops arrived in Charlottesville, Virginia, liberating the slaves
- Chicago Public School Boycott of 22 October 1963, also known as Freedom Day
- New York City school boycott of 3 February 1964, also known as Freedom Day

=== Other places ===
- Freedom Day, an annual celebration marking the Wave Hill walk-off, a landmark in Indigenous land rights, on 23 August at Kalkarindji, Australia
- "Freedom Day" in the United Kingdom, 19 July 2021, on which the last remaining social contact restrictions due to COVID-19 were repealed

== Television ==
- Freedom Day, the fictional holiday celebrated in the episode "A Taste of Freedom" of Futurama in 2002
- "Freedom Day" (Silo), a 2023 television episode

== See also ==
- National Day
- Liberation Day
- Revolution Day
- List of national independence days
