= New York City school boycott =

Civil rights protest, February 3, 1964

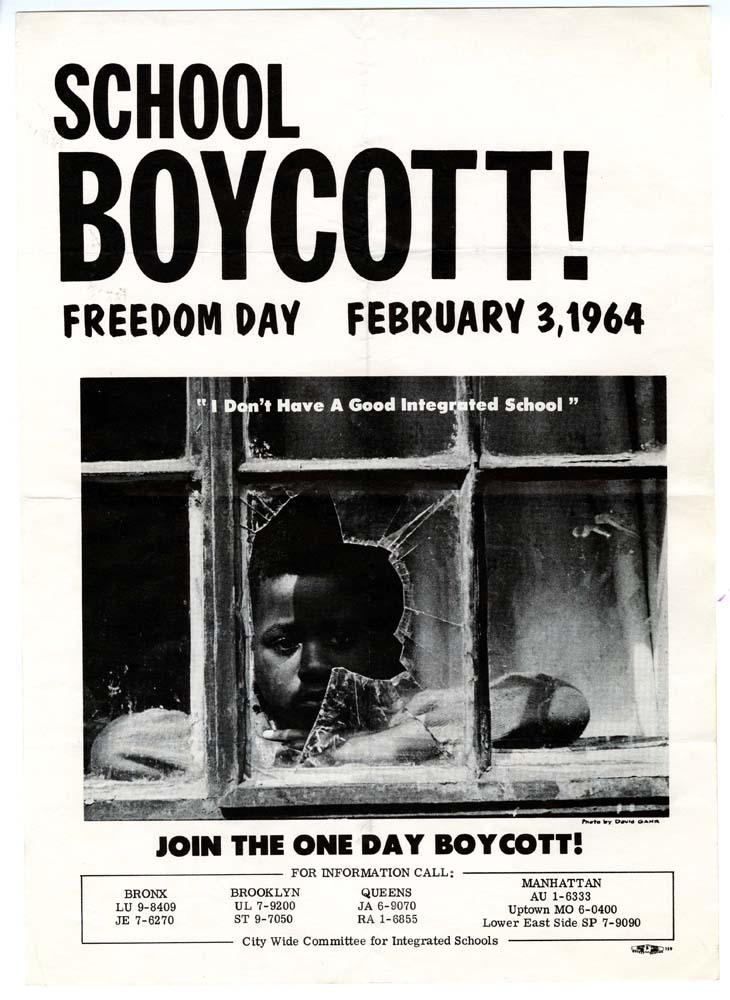
Flier highlights poor conditions in the schools and calls for a one day school boycott.

The New York City school boycott, also referred to as Freedom Day, was a large-scale boycott and protest against segregation in the New York City public school system which took place on February 3, 1964. Students and teachers walked out to highlight the deplorable conditions at public schools in the city, and demonstrators held rallies demanding school integration. It has been described as the largest civil rights protest of the 1960s, involving nearly half a million participants.

== Historical context ==
Freedom Day was part of a larger effort by activists to target the New York City Board of Education through acts of civil disobedience for their failure to implement a reasonable integration plan. The protest followed the smaller Chicago Public Schools boycott, also known as Freedom Day, which took place in October 1963.

Although segregation had been illegal in New York City since 1920, housing patterns and continuing de facto segregation meant schools and housing patterns remained racially segregated and unequal. At the time of the boycott, schools that enrolled mostly black and Latino students tended to have inferior facilities, less experienced teachers and severe overcrowding, with some schools operating on split shifts of as little as four hours a day of class time for some students.

Opponents of integration, including a coalition of predominantly white neighborhood groups called Parents and Taxpayers, emphasized the importance of children attending schools closest to their homes and expressed concerns over busing.

Just prior to the boycott, the Board of Education released a plan for integrating the schools over a three-year period, including limited rezoning, reduction of overcrowding, and improved educational quality in schools serving black and Latino students. Pro-integration activists argued the plan was not comprehensive enough.

A few days before the planned event, The New York Times printed an editorial titled "A Boycott Solves Nothing" condemning the activist leaders and claiming it would be violent, illegal, unreasonable and unjustified.

== Freedom Day ==
The boycott was led by the Reverend Milton Galamison, who organized and chaired the Citywide Committee for Integrated Schools, supported by the NAACP, the Congress of Racial Equality, the National Urban League, the Harlem Parents' Committee, and the Parents' Workshop for Equality. The committee recruited Bayard Rustin, a prominent activist who had played a key role in the successful March on Washington in August 1963, to organize the boycott.

On Monday, February 3, 1964, about 45 percent of all New York City students at the time stayed out of school in the boycott. An estimated 464,361 students and teachers participated overall, exceeding the number of people who took part in the March on Washington. An estimated 90,000 to 100,000 boycotting students attended alternative classes in makeshift "Freedom Schools" where community educators taught lessons in religious institutions, recreational spaces, and private homes. Of the city's 43,865 teachers, 3,357 were absent on the day, triple the usual number, despite threats from School Superintendent Bernard Donovan. Demonstrators also rallied at the Board of Education, City Hall and the office of Governor Rockefeller.

New York's newspapers expressed astonishment at the number of predominantly black and Puerto Rican students who participated — and the complete absence of violence or disorder from the demonstrators.

== Aftermath ==
The boycott did not achieve its objective of forcing immediate reform in the New York City schools, and another school boycott planned for the following month failed due to lack of popular support. Nevertheless, the event could be considered an important step in a much larger movement toward reform.

Despite being a significant event in the history of the civil rights movement, the New York City school boycott does not appear prominently in U.S. history textbooks, perhaps because it runs counter to the dominant narrative that important historical events in the civil rights struggle mostly took place in the South.

The Civil Rights Act of 1964, enacted five months after the New York City school boycott, included a loophole that allowed school segregation to continue in major northern cities including New York City, Boston, Chicago and Detroit. As of 2018, New York City continues to have the most segregated schools in the country.

== See also ==
- Annie Stein, civil rights activist and supporter of Freedom Day
- Freedom Day, other events known as Freedom Day
