= Milton Galamison =

American minister (1923–1988)

Reverend Milton Arthur Galamison
- Born: March 25, 1923; Philadelphia, Pennsylvania, U.S.
- Died: March 9, 1988 (aged 64); Brooklyn, New York, U.S.
- Education: Lincoln University (BD 1947); Princeton Theological Seminary (MTh 1949); Lincoln University (DD 1961)
- Occupation: Minister
- Employer: Siloam Presbyterian Church in Brooklyn
- Organization(s): Parents' Workshop (founder), School and Community Organization for Partnership in Education (founder), Citywide Committee for School Integration (chairman)
- Known for: Activism for school integration
- Board member of: New York City Board of Education
- Spouse: Gladys Hunt (married 1965 – 1988)
- Children: 1

Milton Arthur Galamison (March 25, 1923 – March 9, 1988) was a Presbyterian minister who served in Brooklyn, New York. As a community activist, he championed integration and education reform in the New York City public school system, and organized two school boycotts.

== Early life and education ==
Milton Arthur Galamison was born in Philadelphia, where he experienced poverty and racial bigotry. The black churches in Philadelphia provided cultural, social and educational activities that Galamison could not find elsewhere, and he was active in church youth organizations. He became an acolyte of Reverend Thomas Logan, rector of the St. Augustine Mission in Yonkers and ghost wrote articles for him in the Philadelphia Tribune. To those who knew him, Galamison appeared smart, articulate, self-confident, ambitious, and determined to succeed, but he received mediocre grades in vocational school and graduated Overbooke High School in 1940 with a nonacademic diploma. He realized his best route to success was through the ministry.

Galamison was accepted at St. Augustine's College in Raleigh, North Carolina, a historically black college that aimed to develop students into agents of social change. He subsequently enrolled at Lincoln University in Pennsylvania, graduating cum laude in 1945, and then earned his Bachelor of Divinity from there in 1947. He attended Princeton Theological Seminary and earned a Master of Theology in 1949. He earned a Doctor of Divinity from Lincoln in 1961.

== Ministry ==
In 1947 Galamison was ordained by the Presbyterian Church and was assigned to the Witherspoon Presbyterian Church in Princeton, New Jersey. In 1948 Galamison was picked to serve as head of Siloam Presbyterian Church in the Bedford-Stuyvesant neighborhood of Brooklyn., which at the time was considered one of the most prestigious and exclusive black Presbyterian churches in the U.S. He soon extended the role of the church in the community adding services such as a career guidance center, mental health clinic, academic tutoring and a credit union, and by 1952 Siloam had grown to become the second largest black Presbyterian church in the nation.

As his reputation grew, he began making radio and television appearances, including the Dumont Morning Chapel, Radio Chapel and Frontiers of Faith. He also contributed to the religious sermon column in the Amsterdam News. While his radio sermons were primarily evangelical, his sermons at Siloam were ideological and political with critiques of social injustices such as racism, militarism, and class exploitation.

== Activism ==
In 1955, Galamison was elected to chair of the education committee of the Brooklyn branch of the National Association for the Advancement of Colored People where he advocated for improving education for working class black and Puerto Rican students. In 1959 he founded The Parents' Workshop for Equality in New York Schools with the objectives of achieving racial integration in the schools of New York City, ensuring equal educational opportunity for all children, ending racial discrimination against black and Puerto Rican children, and improving education in the public schools. The Parents' Workshop was a grass roots organization initially housed at Siloam and later expanding to Brooklyn, Manhattan, Queens and the Bronx.

In 1960, Galamison, Annie Stein, Thelma Hamilton and other members of the Parents' Workshop began a campaign to pressure the New York City Board of Education to integrate the schools. After years of fruitless struggle to effect meaningful change, Galamison organized the Citywide Committee for Integrated Schools, a collaboration of the Parents' Workshop, the NAACP, the Congress of Racial Equality, the National Urban League, and the Harlem Parents' Committee, to stage a one-day boycott of the New York City public schools. On February 3, 1964, known as Freedom Day, nearly half a million students opted to stay away from school in what was the largest civil rights demonstration of the 1960s.

On the heels of the success of the Freedom Day boycott, Galamison planned for a follow-on boycott for March 16, 1964. He lost key support from the movements more conservative leaders, however, and due to the resulting organizational fragmentation, this boycott failed to gain sufficient popular support.

The focus of the educational reform movement in New York City shifted from integration to decentralization, and in 1967 Galamison founded a new organization called Citywide Coalition for Community Control. The efforts of this group led to the creation of demonstration schools with locally elected governing boards responsible for decisions related to hiring and curriculum. As a consequence of decentralized decision making, some white teachers were dismissed, and the resulting tensions led to a citywide strike by New York City teachers in 1968 that lasted 36 days.

In July 1968, Mayor John V. Lindsay appointed Galamison to the Board of Education. Rather than signify his final victory in his long battle against inequality in the schools, however, this appointment "confirmed his eclipse and that of the movement he led." After he failed in his bid for reelection to the School Board in 1969, Galamison retired from the political sphere.

During his years as an activist and advocate for reform in the New York City school system, Galamison was arrested nine times for various acts of civil disobedience.

== Later life ==
In addition to his advocacy for education reform, Galamizon organized a vocational school, Opportunities Industrialization Center, in Brooklyn in 1967. He also published articles in magazines such as Freedomways and in religious journals.

Galamison continued to serve as a pastor at Siloam until his death in 1988 following a brief illness.

== See also ==
- Bayard Rustin, activist whom Galamison recruited to organize the New York City school boycott
