= Herbert Fuchs =

American lawyer (1905–1988)

Herbert Fuchs (1905–1988) was an American Communist and federal government official who became a professor of law at the American University in Washington, D.C. in 1949, after which he became embroiled in anti-communist congressional hearings just after the peak of McCarthyism.

== Background ==
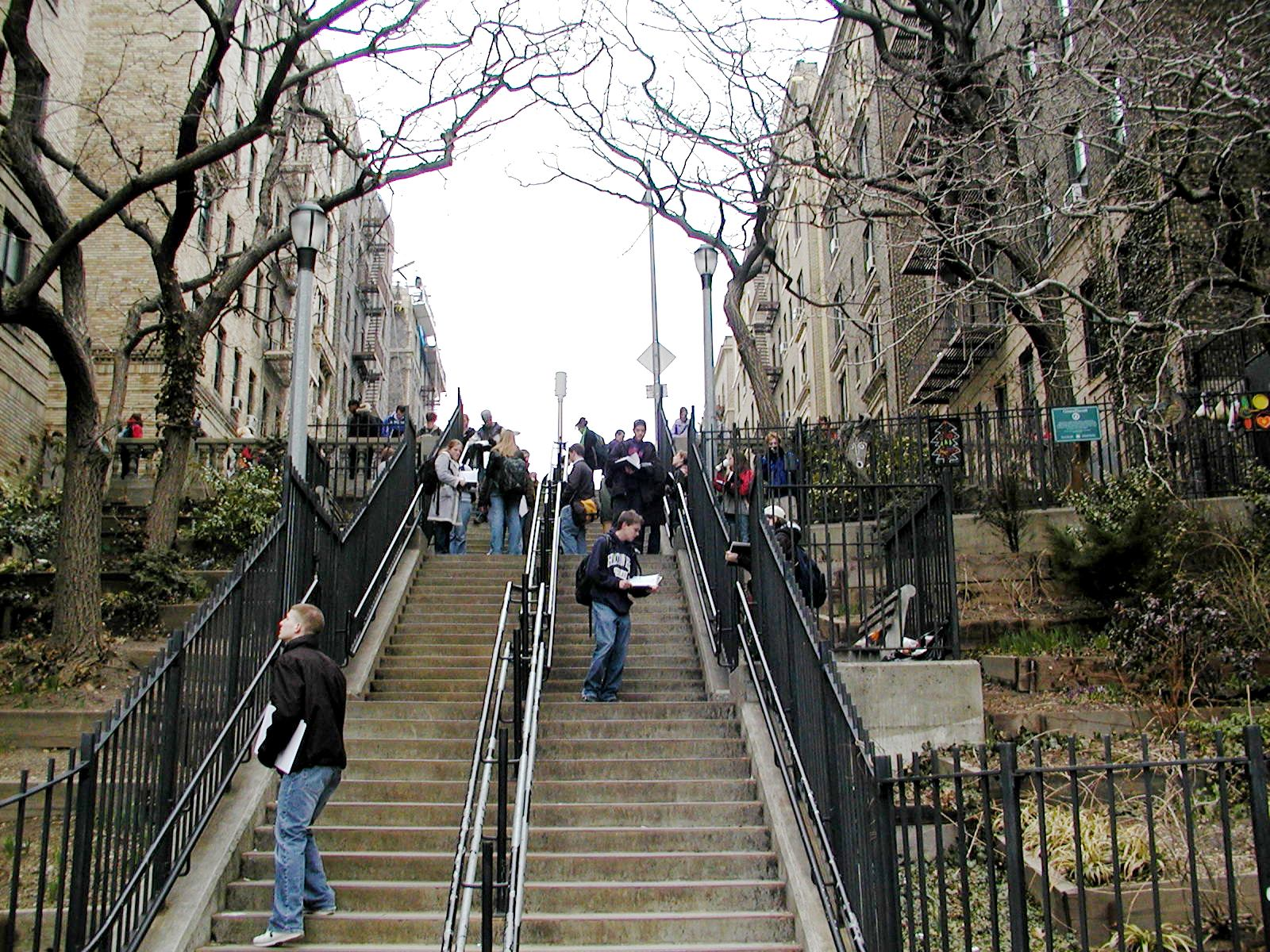
Stairs from Pinehurst Avenue to West 181st Street in Washington Heights (formerly known as "Frankfurt-on-the-Hudson"), the area in Manhattan where the Fuchs family lived

Herbert Oscar Fuchs was born on September 20, 1905, in New York City. His parents Alfred Fuchs and Paula Hacker came from Vienna, Austria, and settled in Manhattan's Washington Heights, then home to many Germans-speakers. His father had been a lawyer in Vienna, but in New York he studied law at New York University and opened in law office in the "Yorkville" section on New York's Upper East Side. Fuchs had two brothers, Walter and Vernon. He attended Townsend Harris Hall (then on the campus of the City College of New York). In 1924, he graduated from City College with a BS in social sciences. In 1928, he graduated with a JD degree in law from New York University.

== Career ==
Fuchs worked in his father's law offices in Manhattan.

=== Government ===
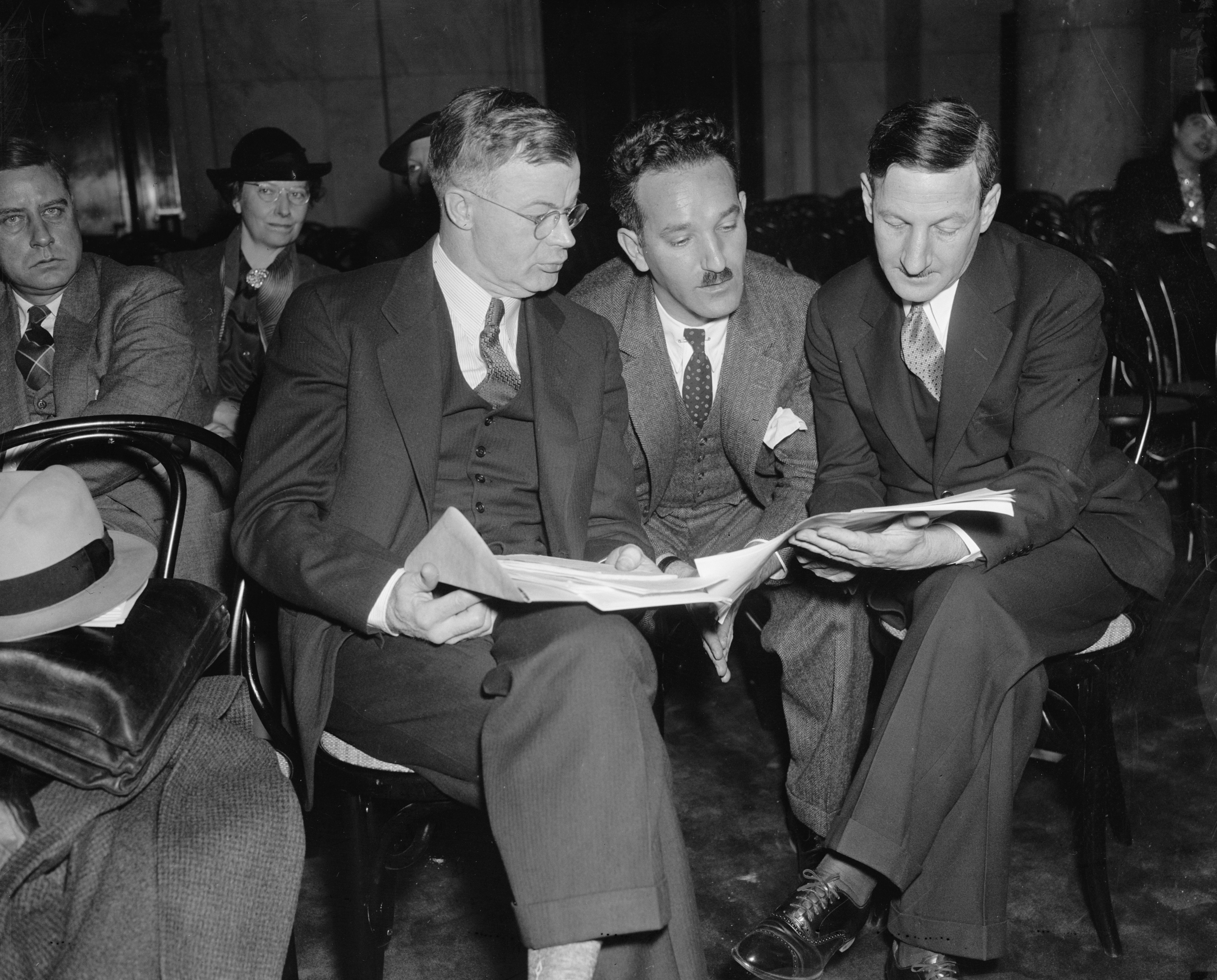
Fuchs worked at the National Labor Relations Board when Nathan Witt (here, middle, in 1937 with J. Warren Madden left and Charles Fahy right)

In July 1936, Fuchs came to Washington, DC, during the New Deal and joined the "Wheeler Committee," i.e., the Subcommittee to Investigate Railroads, Holding Companies, and Related Matters of the United States Senate Committee on Interstate and Foreign Commerce, chaired by US Senator Burton K. Wheeler. (This committee succeeded the Nye Committee and preceded the Truman Committee.) In October 1937, he joined the National Labor Relations Board (NLRB). In the second half of 1942, he joined the Board of Economic Welfare and soon after the National War Labor Board, for whom he relocated to Denver 1943–1945. (He joined a Communist cell in each instance.) In January 1946, he returned to the NLRB as a solicitor. In November 1948, Fuchs left the NRLB as the Hiss-Chambers Case (which had started in August) continued to grab news headlines.

He worked briefly for the Public Affairs Institute and the United States Senate Committee on Education and Labor.

=== Academia and allegations ===
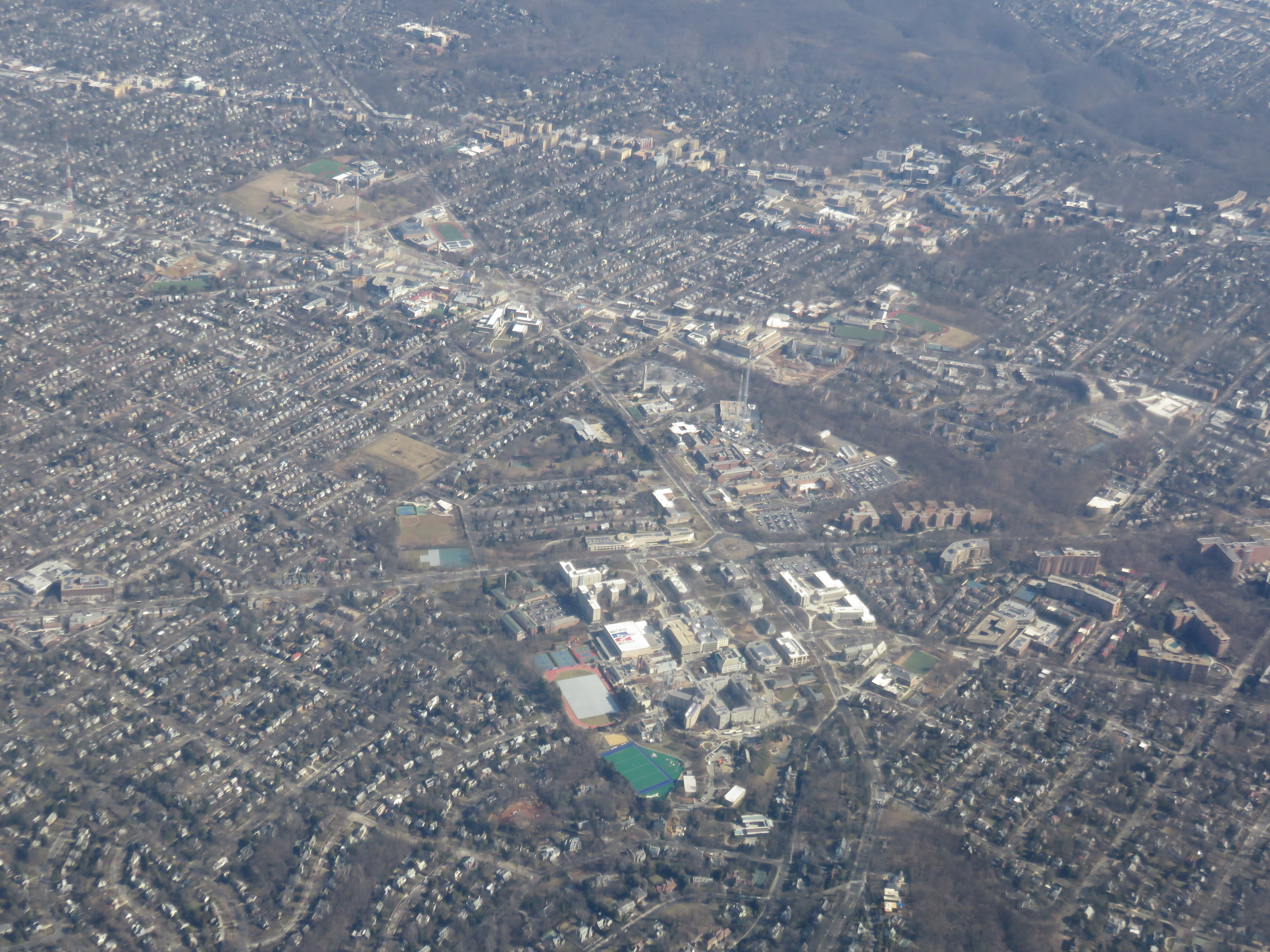
Fuchs taught at American University (here in 2019 with Tenleytown behind)

In 1949, he joined American University as a part-time law professor, with a private law office on Dupont Circle. In 1950, he became a full-time law professor there.

In July 1955, the House Committee on Un-American Activities (HUAC) subpoenaed Fuchs to see whether he could help identify members of the "Ware Group." He testified that he had been a member of the Communist Party USA from 1934 to the late 1940s. He admitted to membership and activities for three Communist cells from 1934 to 1946. Initially, he refused to name names of fellow Party members.

American University President Hurst Robins Anderson initially defended Fuchs after he testified to the committee. Fuchs had fully disclosed to Anderson the extent of his activities at the time the story of his Communist Party membership broke. The university later fired him on the basis that Fuchs had withheld information regarding his Party activities, but could only vouch that the information had been withheld prior to Fuchs being outed for his membership.

In the university community, there was a contingent that believed Anderson had reneged on his initial position when he fired Fuchs for failure to disclose his Communist Party Membership at the time of his hiring. The full story behind the university's firing of Fuchs remains arguable and unclear as Fuchs was cooperating with the Committee at the time he was fired. For some former students the firing put a regretable black eye on an institution otherwise known for progressive leadership in law and governance.

In December 1955, Fuchs again testified before HUAC, and this time he named names. He had been recruited in 1934 in New York City by a "very good friend" and joined a taxicab communist group for a year. He then moved to a Consolidated Edison power plant, where comrades included James Stasinos and Leah Robison. In 1936, on the Wheeler Committee, Arthur Stein (a founder of the United Federal Workers of America) led that group of comrades, who included: James Gorham, Samuel Koenigsberg, Ellis Olim, and Margaret Bennett Porter (wife of John W. Porter). At the NLRB, his comrades were: Arthur Stein again, Allan Rosenberg, Martin Kurasch, Joseph Robison, Eleanor Nelson, Henry Rhine, Philip Reno, Sidney Katz, Julia Katz, and Bernard Stern. At the time, Nathan Witt was NLRB assistant general counsel. HUAC asked him detailed questions about Allan Rosenberg, who had also worked at the Board of Economic Warfare, where his supervisor was Max Lowenthal. Fuchs would not say whether Lowenthal was a communist but did confirm that Rosenberg had also worked in the office of Nathan Witt, by that time Secretary of the NLRB. Fuchs also admitted that he had known Joseph Robison in New York and that Leah Robison was a cousin. Fuchs also mentioned knowing David Rein at the NLRB, as well as afterwards when Rein entered private practice. Returning to comrades at the Board of Economic Welfare, Fuchs named Woodrow Sandler, Jacob H. Krug, Mortimer Riemer, Ruth Weyand, Margaret Bennett Porter, John W. Porter, Harry Cooper, Frank Donner, Edward Scheunemann, Bert Diamond. Eventually, Fuchs named Victor Perlo as Party dues collector at the NLRB; Arthur Stein succeeded him. Toward the end of his testimony, HUAC had an editorial read into the transcript from a December 10, 1955, issue of the Saturday Evening Post entitled "Why No Fuss When a Helpful Ex-Red Professor is Fired?" in support of Fuch's termination at American University.

Fuchs was exonerated of any illegal activities with respect to his Party membership. Representative Gordon H. Scherer stated, "to start to fire men who cooperate with the committee can only... stop others from cooperating."

=== Return to government ===
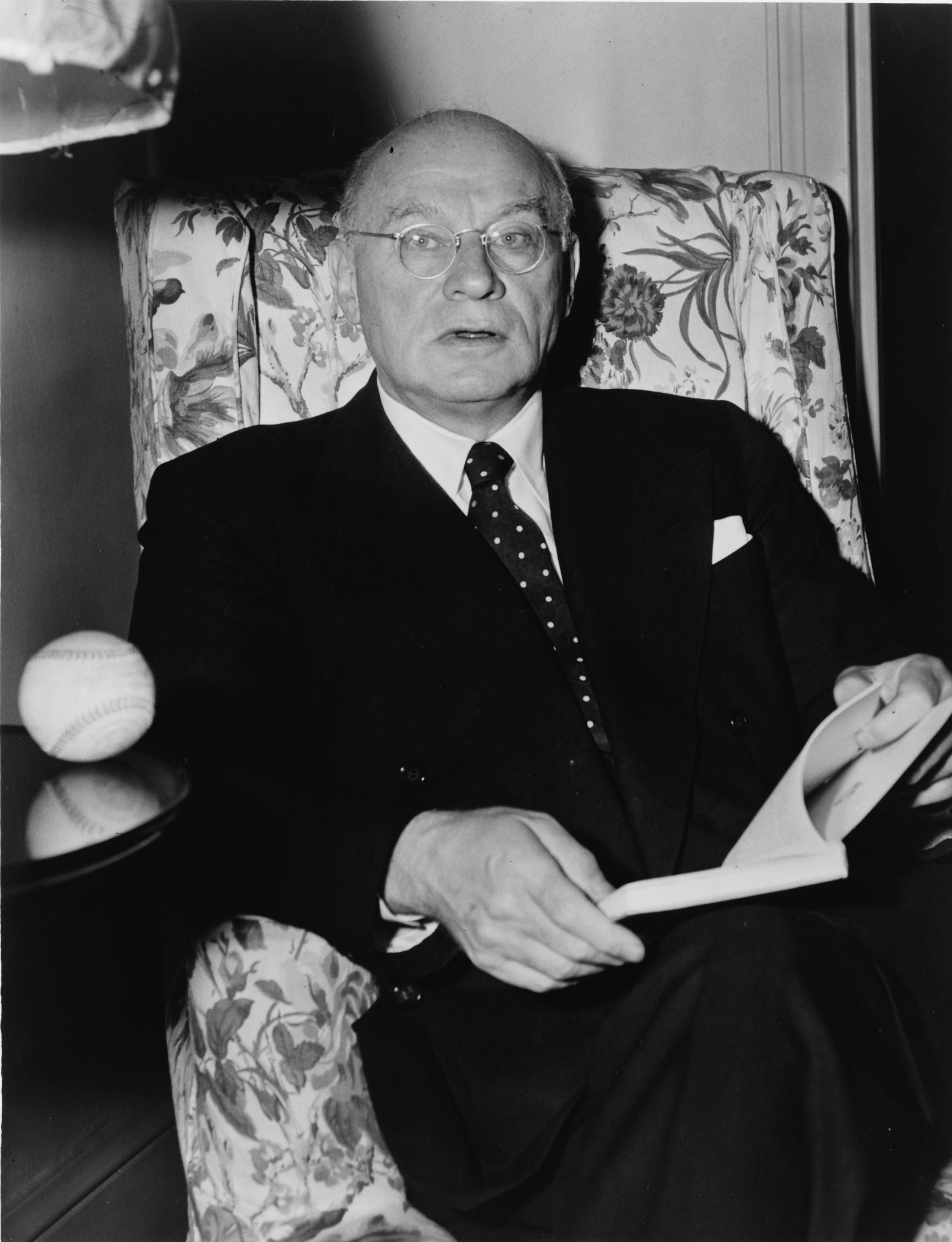
Emanuel Celler, Dean of the United States House of Representatives, rehired Fuchs to government as a committee staffer

HUAC Chairman Francis Walters later helped Fuchs obtain a staff position with House Judiciary Committee chairman Emanuel Celler. Fuchs remained on the Judiciary Committee staff until he retired.

== Personal life and death ==
Fuchs married Frances Rice; they had two children. Their daughter Margaret Fuchs Singer wrote about her father's ordeal in Legacy of a False Promise.

Fuchs died in the Spring of 1988.

== Sources ==
- Legacy of False Promise: A Daughters Reckoning (2009)

== See also ==
- Arthur Stein (activist)
- Nathan Witt
- National Labor Relations Board
- McCarthyism
- House Un-American Activities Committee
