= World Freedom Day (United States) =

US federal observance, November 9

- Observed by: United States
- Date: November 9
- Next time: November 9, 2027
- Frequency: annual

World Freedom Day is a United States federal observance declared by then-President George W. Bush to commemorate the fall of the Berlin Wall and the end of communist rule in Central and Eastern Europe. It started in 2001 and is celebrated on November 9.

== History ==
For this occasion, conservative youth groups such as Young America's Foundation and the College Republicans urge students to commemorate this day (which they mark as the start of "Freedom Week," thus including Veterans Day) by "celebrating victory over communism" through provocative flyer campaigns and activism projects. Many conservative political commentators and activists use World Freedom Day as an occasion in which to acclaim President Ronald Reagan, whom they regard as being responsible for the collapse of the Soviet Union and the end of the Cold War.

== Observances ==
On November 9, 2005, President Bush proclaimed November 9 as World Freedom Day. On November 8, 2016, President Barack Obama proclaimed World Freedom Day as November 9, 2016. On November 8, 2017, President Donald Trump proclaimed November 9, 2017, as World Freedom Day.

== See also ==
- European Day of Remembrance for Victims of Stalinism and Nazism
- Freedom Day
- International observance
