= Public holidays in Equatorial Guinea =

This is a list of holidays in Equatorial Guinea.

- January 1: New Year's Day
- April 7: Good Friday
- May 1: Labour Day
- June 5: President's Day, birthday of President Teodoro Obiang Nguema Mbasogo.
- June 8: Corpus Christi
- August 3: Freedom Day, marks the date in 1979 when Teodoro Obiang deposed the dictator Francisco Macías Nguema.
- August 15: Constitution Day, honors the Constitution of 1982.
- October 12: Independence Day, from Spain, 1968.
- December 8: Immaculate Conception, Roman Catholic feast day.
- December 25: Christmas Day
