= Jonah Raskin =

American writer (born 1942)

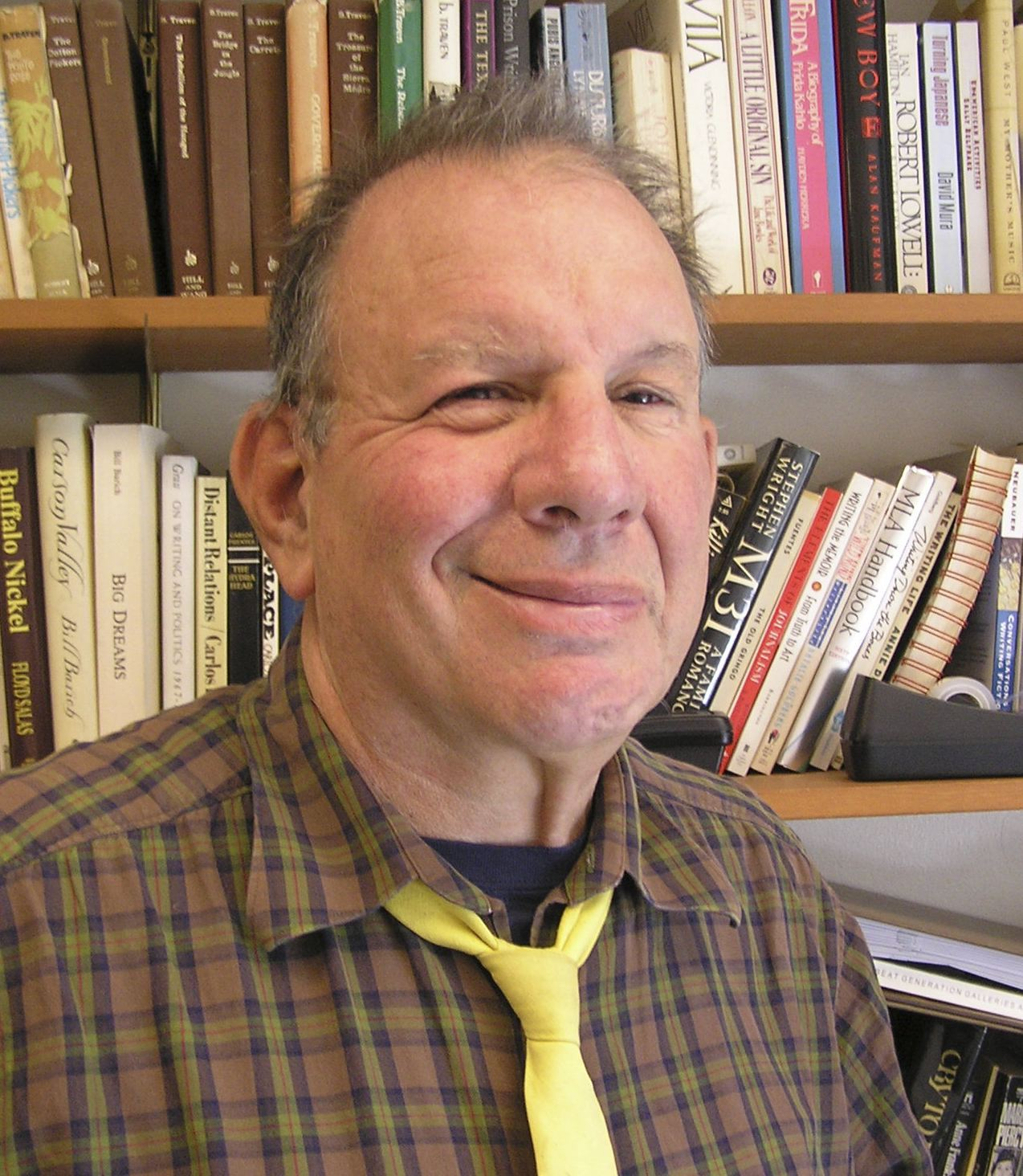
- Photograph by Daniel Raskin, May 2005
- Born: January 3, 1942 (age 84); New York City, U.S.
- Education: Columbia University (BA, MA); University of Manchester (PhD)
- Occupations: Writer, professor
- Employer: Sonoma State University
- Spouse: Eleanor Raskin

Jonah Raskin (born January 3, 1942) is an American writer who left an East Coast university teaching position to participate in the 1970s radical counterculture as a freelance journalist, then returned to the academy in California in the 1980s to write probing studies of Abbie Hoffman and Allen Ginsberg and reviews of northern California writers whom he styled as "natives, newcomers, exiles and fugitives." Beginning as a lecturer in English at Sonoma State University in 1981, he moved to chair of the Communications Studies Department from 1988 to 2007, while serving as a book reviewer for the San Francisco Chronicle and the Santa Rosa Press-Democrat. He retired from his teaching position in 2011.

== Early life ==
Born in New York City to a secular Jewish family, Raskin was raised in Huntington, Long Island. His parents were Communists in the 1930s and 1940s, but as his father became a successful attorney in the 1950s, they concealed their radical politics and were careful to blend into their middle-class community. Hiding, dissembling, and disguising would become persistent themes in Raskin's writing, along with the personas of the exile and the fugitive. Raskin gave every appearance of being the all-American teenager; he was co-captain of his high school football team, and named to Newsday's All-Suffolk Football Squad in 1958. He also worked as a sports reporter for The Long Islander in his last year of high school.

Raskin attended Columbia College, studying literature with Lionel Trilling, receiving a B.A. degree in 1963, and an M.A. in American Literature in 1964. He taught at Winston-Salem State College in the summer of 1964, then married and moved to England in the fall to study British and American literature at the University of Manchester. He received his Ph.D. in 1967 with a dissertation on the mythology of imperialism in the work of Rudyard Kipling and Joseph Conrad, and obtained his first full-time teaching position in the English Department at the State University of New York at Stony Brook from 1967 to 1972. Raskin turned his Ph.D. thesis into a book entitled The Mythology of Imperialism, which Random House published in 1971. The New York Times called it "Maoist" literary criticism. Edward Said, the author of Orientalism and Culture and Imperialism, wrote in 1984 that it was "one of the genuinely important handful of books on modern literature published in the last two decades", and that "Raskin's quite unique feat was to have connected the genuine aesthetic power of the novelists to the political power of the culture abroad." The Mythology of Imperialism has since been republished in a new edition by Monthly Review Press, with a new introduction and conclusion by Raskin and a foreword by Columbia literature professor Bruce Robbins.

== Into the Seventies ==
Identifying with the growing social movements of the late 1960s, Raskin joined the building occupation led by Students for a Democratic Society (SDS) at Columbia University in 1968. His wife, Eleanor Raskin, became involved with the Weatherman faction of SDS, and he followed with some ambivalence. He was arrested and beaten by New York police in December 1969 after smashing windows in a street demonstration organized by Weatherman. Failing to get tenure at Stony Brook because of his militant activity, Raskin abandoned his academic career for the life of a radical free-lance journalist.

He joined Abbie Hoffman, Jerry Rubin and Paul Krassner in the Youth International Party (the Yippies) in 1967, and was designated its Minister of Education in 1970. He traveled to Algiers with Jennifer Dohrn (sister of Weather Underground leader Bernardine Dohrn) as part of a Yippie delegation in October 1970 to meet with Eldridge Cleaver and Timothy Leary, whom the Weather Underground had helped escape from a low-security prison in California. Their plan, to link the anti-war movement in the United States with global protests, came to naught when Cleaver attempted to arrest Leary, and Leary and his wife fled to Switzerland. Raskin later interviewed Leary for High Times magazine shortly before Leary's death in 1996.

In 1974, Raskin received a grant from the Rabinowitz Foundation in N.Y. for research on the Cold War and American culture in the literature of the period from 1945 to 1960, reading and interviewing that would inform his later book on Allen Ginsberg and the Beat Generation, American Scream.

Raskin helped Abbie Hoffman go underground in 1974, and traveled with him when he was a fugitive for much of the 1970s, coming into contact once again with the Weather Underground, a subject he addressed in an autobiographical novel, Underground. His wife Eleanor had become a fugitive, and he made an unsuccessful effort to preserve their floundering marriage by making contact with her. In 1974 Raskin compiled and wrote an introduction to a collection of Weather Underground communiqués, The Weather Eye, and set up an imprint, Union Square Press, to publish the work. His introduction was academic in tone, and gave no hint that he'd had a hand in drafting the statement, "New Morning, Changing Weather", that adopted a more moderate tone and began the process of Weather leaders resurfacing from the underground.

During this period Raskin lived on fees and advances from articles and books, writing for a variety of publications including Monthly Review, the San Francisco Review of Books, The International Herald Tribune, The Los Angeles Times and the Village Voice, and for various alternative newspapers and magazines, including Liberation News Service, The Seed, University Review, Liberation, The San Francisco Bay Guardian, L.A. Weekly, and the northern California Bohemian. He covered the trial of the Panther 21 in New York in 1970, and wrote about such fugitives and prisoners as Dennis Banks of the American Indian Movement and Oscar Collazo, the Puerto Rican nationalist. He traveled to Mexico in 1975 in search of the elusive writer B. Traven, a journey that became the subject of My Search for B. Traven.

Raskin settled in Sonoma County, California, in the winter of 1976, where he had come to visit his parents, who had retired to the rural community of Occidental. Gradually detaching himself from New York and the radical left, Raskin began to meet such California writers as Tillie Olsen and Jessica Mitford, and pitched ideas for movies to Hollywood producers. He created the characters and the story about marijuana cultivation in northern California for the movie Homegrown, eventually produced in 1996 and directed by Stephen Gyllenhaal; Raskin appears in a crowd scene at the end of the film.

== Return to the university in the 1980s ==
Raskin returned to academics as a lecturer in the English Department at Sonoma State University from 1981 to 1987, and became chair of the Communication Studies Department from 1988 to date (2007). He has taught media law, the history of communications, film noir, and writing for newspapers, magazines, radio, the movies and memoirs. He was a Fulbright Professor at the University of Ghent and University of Antwerp, Belgium, in 1986–1987, teaching 19th and 20th century American literature and culture.

During the 1980s and 1990s, Raskin wrote scores of book reviews for the Santa Rosa Press Democrat, the San Francisco Chronicle, the Los Angeles Times, and a variety of other publications. His signature format coupled his reviews with separate in-depth interviews that often evoked wide-ranging conversations with the authors, including writers from Doris Lessing and Kurt Vonnegut to Alice Walker and Greg Sarris.

Raskin's biography of Abbie Hoffman, For the Hell of It, captures the genius and the flaws of the Yippie spokesman and his place in the tumultuous sixties, follows him as he flees underground to avoid prison on drug charges, and is straightforward in acknowledging the bipolar disorder that led to Hoffman's suicide in 1989.

In American Scream, Raskin studies Allen Ginsberg's development as a poet in the context of the poem, "Howl". Raskin traces Ginsberg's studies with Lionel Trilling, his relationship with his father (a schoolteacher and poet), and his Beat Generation colleagues. Raskin explores the consequences of Ginsberg's mother's mental illness on the theme of societal insanity in "Howl", and relates the court case that set a new direction for artistic freedom at the end of the repressive 1950s.

Raskin has subjected his radicalism of the 1960s and 1970s to a searching and thoughtful analysis, and he now views his affiliation with the Weather Underground and his endorsement of its politics as largely self-dramatization that wasted the energy and resources of the above-ground enablers as well as the underground fugitives. A final moment of political disillusionment with the radical left and dreams of Third World socialism came with a visit to Hanoi in 1995, where he experienced Vietnam as a country run by a Communist elite rapidly enriching themselves from a freewheeling capitalist economy.

Raskin's distance from his former comrades is apparent in his new introduction to the collection of Weather Underground communiqués republished, along with his original introduction, in Sing a Battle Song. Raskin allowed his introduction to be edited for the collection, but he published an expanded version in a left journal. To anyone who wants to go underground and commit acts of violence in America today, Raskin advises, "Don’t do it. Be visible. Talk openly. Go out and meet people. Organize. Educate. Avoid violence. Democracy is in the streets, on the Internet, and wherever people meet."

== Current work ==
In the 1990s, Raskin began writing poetry and publishing it in chapbooks. His poems are unpredictable – alternately satiric, droll, and tender. He often performs his poems with musicians. Continuing his work on northern California authors, Raskin edited a book of Jack London's political writing, The Radical Jack London, adding a significant interpretive essay. His latest books are Field Days: A Year of Farming, Eating and Drinking Wine in California (2009); Marijuanaland: Dispatches from an American War (2011), and A Terrible Beauty: The Wilderness of American Literature (2014). He began reviewing with New York Journal of Books in 2015. He contributed a commentary column and a negative review of Barbara Kingsolver's novel Demon Copperhead to County Highway, a print-only publication created by David Samuels and Walter Kirn, for its debut edition of July–August 2023.

== Publications by Jonah Raskin ==
Books

- The Mythology of Imperialism: Rudyard Kipling, Joseph Conrad, E. M. Forster, D. H. Lawrence, and Joyce Cary (New York: Random House, 1971). ISBN 0-394-46837-6. (New edition published by Monthly Review Press, 2009.)
- Out of the Whale: Growing up in the American Left (New York: Links, 1974). ISBN 0-8256-3039-8
- Editor, The Weather Eye: Communiques from the Weather Underground (New York: Union Square Press, 1974).
- Puerto Rico: The Flame of Resistance, co-author with Lincoln Bergman et al. (San Francisco: Peoples Press, 1976/7?) ISBN 0-914750-05-4
- Oscar Collazo: Portrait of a Puerto Rican Patriot (New York: New York Committee to Free the Puerto Rican Nationalist Prisoners, 1978).
- Underground: In Pursuit of B. Traven and Kenny Love (Indianapolis: Bobbs-Merrill, 1978). ISBN 0-672-52382-5
- My Search for B. Traven (New York: Methuen, 1980). ISBN 0-416-00741-4 Translated into French by Virgine Girard, A la recherche de B. Traven (Arles: Les Fondeurs de Briques, 2007).
- James D. Houston (Boise, Idaho: Boise State University, 1991). ISBN 0-88430-098-6
- For the Hell of It: The Life and Times of Abbie Hoffman (Berkeley: University of California Press, 1996). ISBN 0-520-20575-8
- American Scream: Allen Ginsberg's "Howl" and the Making of the Beat Generation (Berkeley: University of California Press, 2004). ISBN 0-520-24015-4
- Natives, Newcomers, Exiles and Fugitives (Healdsburg, California: Running Wolf Press, 2004). ISBN 0-9701333-8-3
- editor, The Radical Jack London: Writings on War and Revolution (Berkeley: University of California Press, 2008). ISBN 0-520-25546-1
- Field Days: A Year of Farming, Eating and Drinking Wine in California (Berkeley: University of California Press, 2009). ISBN 978-0-520-26803-6
- Marijuanaland: Dispatches from an American War (New York: High Times Books, 2011). ISBN 978-1-893010-30-7
- James McGrath: In a Class by Himself (Santa Rosa, CA: McCaa Books, 2012). ISBN 978-0-9838892-9-8
- Rock 'n' Roll Women (Santa Rosa, CA: McCaa Books, 2012). ISBN 978-0983889236
- A Terrible Beauty: The Wilderness of American Literature (Berkeley: Regent Press, 2014). ISBN 978-1587902789

Poetry chapbooks

- Jonah Raskin's Greatest Hits: Poems 1996-1998 (Healdsburg, California: Running Wolf Press, 1999).
- More Poems, Better Poems (Healdsburg, California: Running Wolf Press, 2001).
- Bone Love (San Francisco: Alexander Book Company, 2004).
- Public Spaces, Private Places: New Poems (Salt Spring Island, BC: Running Wolf Press, 2007). ISBN 0-9746680-7-9

== See also ==
- Eleanor Raskin
