= Eleanor Raskin =

American lawyer

- Born: Eleanor E. Stein; March 16, 1946 (age 80); Washington, D.C., US
- Other name: Sally (Sarah) Maynard
- Occupations: Adjunct instructor Albany Law School. Former Administrative Law Judge, NYS Public Service Commission
- Known for: Former member of the 1970s group Weatherman (Organization)
- Parent(s): Annie Stein, Arthur Stein (activist)

Eleanor E. Raskin (née Stein; born March 16, 1946) is a former member of the Weathermen. She is currently an adjunct instructor at Albany Law School. She was an administrative law judge at the New York State Public Service Commission.

== Background ==
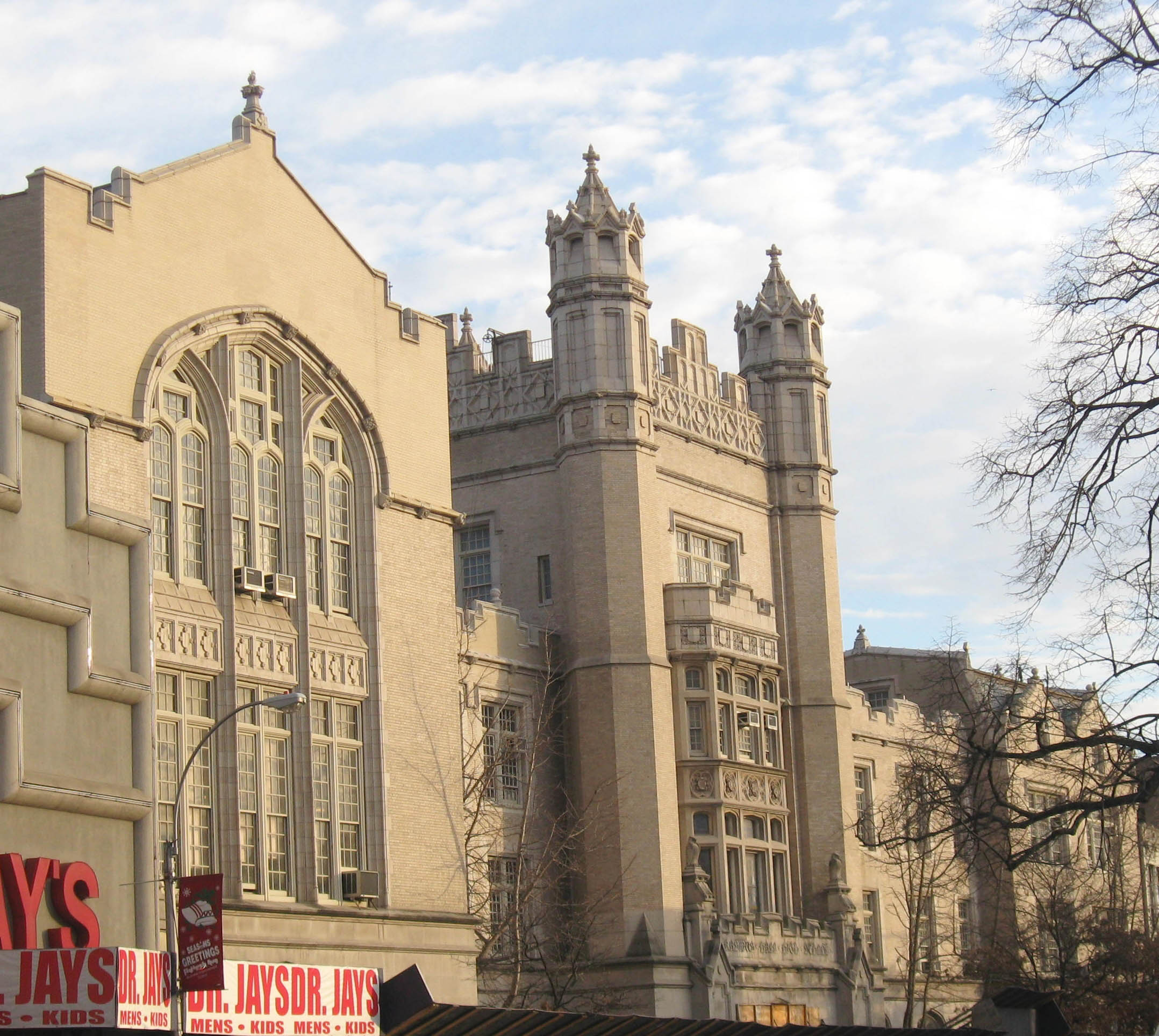
Erasmus Hall High School (2008), which Raskin attended

Eleanor E. Stein (Note: "Eleanor Raskin" is the name that the FBI files referred to her as and what most people during the Weatherman period knew her by. However, she was only married for a brief time to Jonah Raskin. Today, she goes by the name, "Eleanor Stein," and to avoid confusion, this article refers to her by that name throughout.) was born on March 16, 1946. Her parents, Annie Stein and Arthur Stein, were Jewish and belonged to the Communist Party. Her father was an economist in the New Deal and her mother was active in promoting social causes such as civil rights. Before Stein was five years old, her mother, who was the secretary of the Coordinating Committee for the Enforcement of the D.C. Anti-Discrimination Laws, allowed her to arrange pastries on a large platter before every meeting. Stein looked forward to the arrival of Mary Church Terrell (Note: Mary Church Terrell was an African American woman who fought for equality and social reform. Additional information on her can be found on Wikipedia and http://www.americaslibrary.gov/jb/civil/jb_civil_terrell_1.html) at these meetings, because Terrell would usually bring a small present for her. On Saturdays, Annie Stein would dress up the children and stand on street corners, passing out literature to passersby. During the month of January or June, Stein would accompany her grandfather on picket lines or hand out leaflets. A family friend, Chavy Wiener (Note: Chavy was a nickname her Yiddish friends called her. Her real name was Evelyn. Read Stein's tribute to Evelyn Wiener here) introduced her to communism by reading to her a Soviet children's book, The Story of Zoya and Shura. (Note: Shura and Zoya Kosmodemyanskaya were brother and sister who were part of the partisan resistance movement in western USSR during World War II. More information on them as well as the book can be found on http://www.greeklish.org/features/zoya/index.htm)

When Stein was a student at Erasmus Hall High School, she was a member of the honor roll, the editor-in-chief of the school's student newspaper: Dutchman, captain of the debating team and secretary for the mathematics team. As a junior high student, she wrote a poem with political inflections called "The North Star." The opening lines are as follows:

A heavenly guide for refuge,
The way to freedom
For those escaped from the shackles of slavery
And martyrdom.

== Career ==
=== College life and first marriage ===
In 1963, Stein attended Barnard College; where she met Jonah Raskin, a graduate student in the English Department. On August 28, 1964, they were married at the Foley Square Courthouse, and hours after the wedding, the couple boarded a plane to Manchester, England. She enrolled in undergraduate courses at the University of Manchester. During their time abroad, they traveled to London School of Economics to attend Malcolm X's discussion on imperialism in February 1965.

Anxious to return home after three years in England, Stein finished her thesis which earned her the distinction of being the first American Studies graduate from Manchester to earn first-class honors. In the summer of 1967, they returned to New York where she applied for law school at Columbia University. Her marriage to Jonah Raskin ended in November 1969.

=== SDS and Weatherman ===
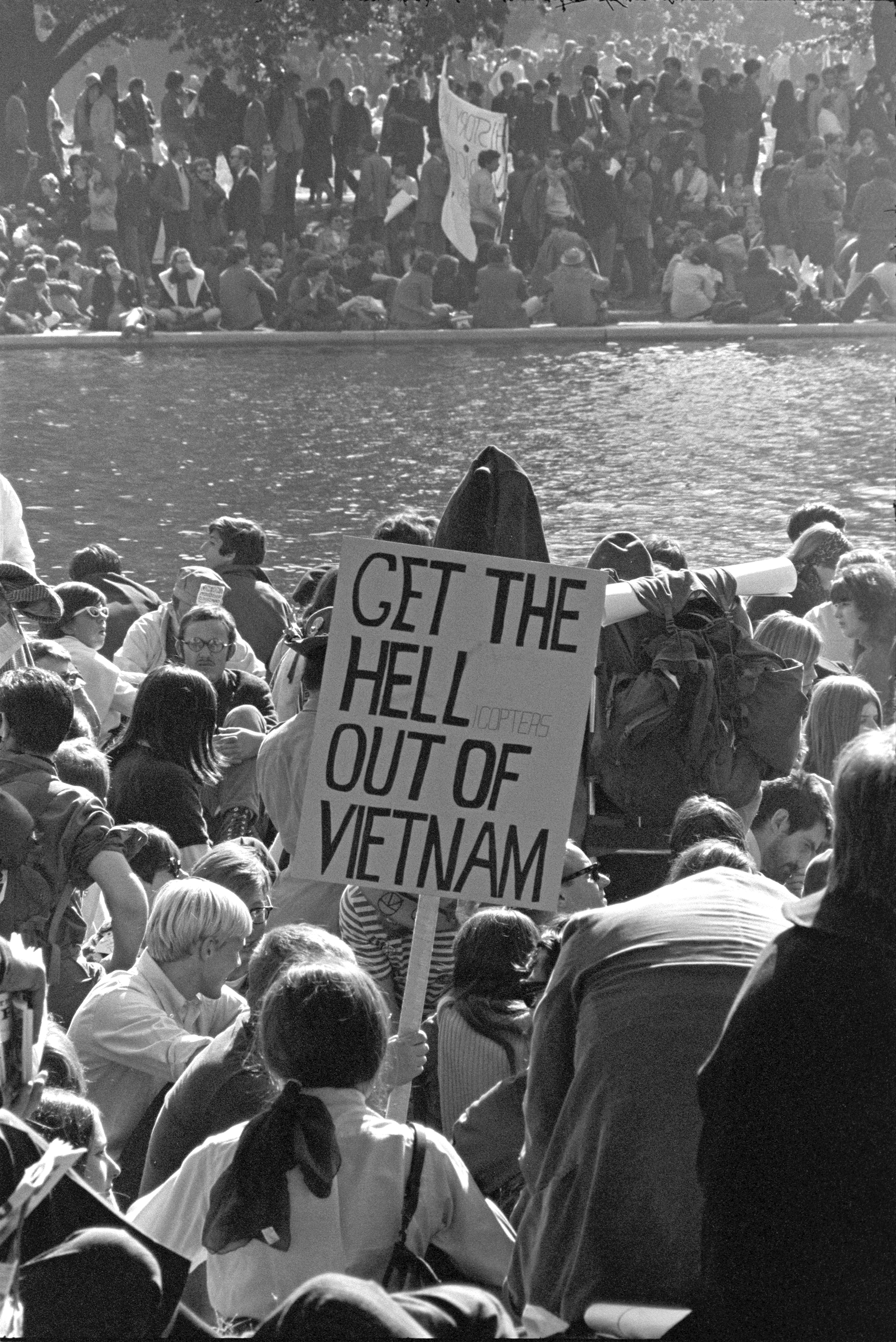
Protesters march on the Pentagon (October 21, 1967) of the kind that Eleanor Stein attended

A year before joining Students for a Democratic Society (SDS), Eleanor Stein and Annie Stein participated in the protest at the Pentagon in 1967. In April, she and her mother were involved in the Columbia University protests of 1968. More than 700 students, including Eleanor Stein, were arrested. She was charged with criminal trespass, fined $25 and released without bail. Stein joined SDS in fall 1968. By March 1969, she led more than two hundred students in pickets of Columbia buildings. The New York Times quoted her: "We've effectively shut down the college and cut down attendance at the university by half," said Mrs. Eleanor Raskin, an SDS spokesman who is a second-year law student at Columbia. "This strike is the opening gun. This strike is our first blow." At a news conference, Mrs. Raskin "... warned that if Columbia failed to act on the demands before the end of the spring vacation, which begins Friday and ends April 6, the SDS chapter would "take further action.""

During the summer of 1969, Stein became a member of Weatherman organization and co-authored The Bust Book: What to Do Until the Lawyer Comes, with Kathy Boudin, Gus Reichbach and Brian Glick. The Bust Book is a handbook for political activists and legal defendants. In August 1969, Stein and fellow Weatherman members: Bernardine Dohrn, Ted Gold, Dianne Donghi and Diana Oughton traveled as SDS delegates to Cuba to meet with representatives of the Cuban and North Vietnamese governments.

Part one of Columbia Revolt

Part two

On September 3, 1969, Stein and about 75 women stormed a Pittsburgh high school called South Hills and participated in a "jailbreak" to advertise for the Days of Rage. Weather women spray painted "Ho Lives" (in reference to spiritual and political North Vietnam leader, Ho Chi Minh who had recently died) and "Free Huey" (Huey P. Newton was a member of the Black Panther Party who was incarcerated for a gunfight which left a police officer dead) on the school's main entrance doors. Stein was arrested and charged with rioting, inciting a riot and disorderly conduct. She was told to pay a $25 fine and $11 in court costs; she was held on $1,500 bail. Stein and twenty-five others were taken to the Allegheny County Jail.

In early November, shortly before leaving Jonah Raskin, she wrote a letter to the Dean of Columbia University:

Dear Sir:
I would like to apply for a leave of absence for a year, 1969-1970. I am sorry to apply so late, but I have been in jail in Pittsburgh, Pa., for political activities.
I would like to use this critical year to employ my legal skills in aiding in the defense of political prisoners, such as the Conspiracy Eight (Note: Conspiracy Eight is now known as Chicago Seven. The group was accused of conspiracy, inciting to riot, and other charges related to protests that took place in Chicago, Illinois on the occasion of the 1968 Democratic National Convention.) and others in Chicago. The shortage of lawyers doing this kind of work, and the need for it, makes me feel the urgency of helping in these major criminal defenses.
I would be glad to give more details if necessary. Thank you very much,
Yours,
Eleanor Raskin

As Jonah Raskin had written, she "packed a suitcase, threw away her jewelry, miniskirts, long evening gowns, her shoes, sold her books, and moved to a Weatherman Collective.", Stein was ending her old life to begin a revolution.

=== Underground ===
After the Greenwich Village townhouse explosion on March 6, 1970, which claimed the lives of Weatherman members Ted Gold, Diana Oughton, and Terry Robbins, she helped disguise Cathy Wilkerson, one of the two survivors of the explosion, by dyeing her hair to transform her appearance from hippie to secretary. The FBI launched an extensive manhunt to capture affiliates of the organization, and Stein sought safety by relocating with Weather comrade Jeff Jones to the Catskills Mountains to establish a new network. It was there that they fell in love.

The next trace of Jones and Stein was in Hoboken, New Jersey, in 1979, when police raided an apartment where materials for making bombs were found. The apartment was traced to the couple, who were indicted in absentia.

On October 23, 1981, they were arrested by a dozen-member SWAT team while watching the World Series in their Bronx apartment. They were charged with unlawful flight to avoid prosecution in New Jersey on charges of unlawful possession of explosives.

On December 11, 1981, a week before Jones was sentenced, the couple were married in the Municipal Building in Lower Manhattan.

All charges against Stein were dismissed.,

=== Life after Weatherman ===
After having placed her education on hold for thirteen years, Stein attempted to finish her law degree at Columbia Law School. In 1982, her request to be reinstated was denied. Having been spurned by Columbia, she applied at City University of New York Law School at Queens College and graduated in 1986. She is currently an administrative law judge with the NYS Public Service Commission. Stein was previously a visiting associate professor at Albany Law School and taught transnational environmental law. For ten years she served as an Administrative Law Judge at the New York State Public Service Commission in Albany, New York, where she presided over and mediated New York's Renewable Portfolio Standard proceeding, authoring in June 2004 a comprehensive decision recommending a landmark state environmental initiative to combat global warming with incentives for renewable resource-fueled power generation. In addition to Transnational Environmental Law, she has taught Alternative Dispute Resolution, Telecommunications Law for the Twentieth Century, Civil Procedure, and Applied Legal Reasoning (academic support) at Albany Law School and Women's Rights as International Human Rights at the State University of New York at Albany. She is the author of Book Review: The Philosophical Foundations of Environmental Law: Property, Rights and Nature, and Ecological Sensitivity and Global Legal Pluralism, forthcoming in SOCIAL AND LEGAL STUDIES, London; Global Warming: An International Human Rights Violation? Inuit Communities Petition at the Inter-American Commission On Human Rights, forthcoming in GOVERNMENT, LAW AND POLICY JOURNAL; The New York Renewable Portfolio Standard: Case Study in Process and Substance, 16 ENV. L. IN NEW YORK 3 (February 2005); and To Be of Use: W. Haywood Burns, 106 YALE LAW JOURNAL 753 (with Michael Ratner).

== Personal life ==
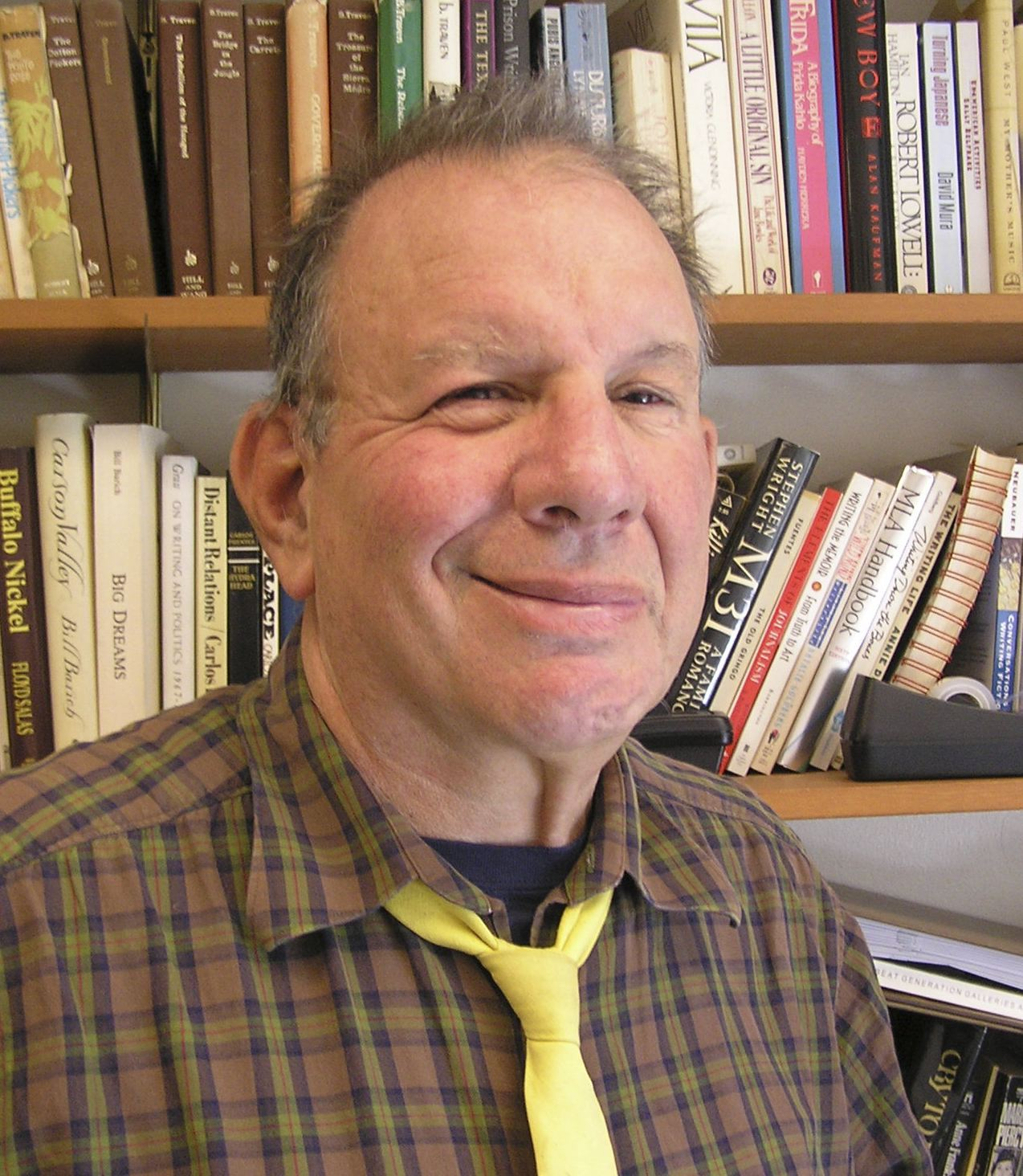
Jonah Raskin (2005 by Daniel Raskin) was Eleanor Stein's first husband

On August 28, 1964, Eleanor Stein married Jonah Raskin at the Foley Square Courthouse and hours later boarded a plane to Manchester, England. She left him by the end of 1968.

After the Greenwich Village townhouse explosion, Stein disappeared with Jeff Jones in the Catskills Mountains, where they fell in love. Their son, Thai Jones, was born on April 30, 1977, named after Nguyen Thai, a Vietcong fighter who had campaigned against the French and American armies and whom Stein had met when traveling to Havana in 1969. On January 1, 1981, daughter Coco Jones was stillborn. Arthur Jones, named after Stein's father, was born on September 22, 1982. On December 11, 1981, a week before Jones was sentenced, the couple were married in the Municipal Building in Lower Manhattan. After the two-minute ceremony, their son, Thai Jones showered them with brown organic rice.

Currently, Eleanor Raskin lives with husband Jeff Jones in Albany, New York.

== Legacy ==
Thai Jones wrote a book released in 2004 called A Radical Line: From the Labor Movement to the Weather Underground, One Family's Century of Conscience which chronicled his parents' experiences with Weatherman.

== See also ==
- Annie Stein
- Arthur Stein (activist)
- Weatherman (organization)

== Bibliography ==
- Berger, Dan. Outlaws of America. (AK Press, 2006).
- Bonapace, Ruth. "Jones Pleads Guilty to Bomb Charge, Faces Chicago Charge," The Associated Press, November 5, 1981, retrieved on Nov. 10, 2008.
- Hollander, Paul. Anti-Americanism. (Transaction Publishers: Edison, New Jersey, 1995).
- Jacobs, Ron. The Way the Wind Blew: A History of the Weather Underground. (Verso: New York, 1997).
- Jones, Thai. A Radical Line: From the Labor Movement to the Weather Underground, One Family's Century of Conscience. (Free Press: New York, New York, 2004).
- Kraft, Scott. "The Brink's Job: Blowing The "Lid Off The Weather Underground," The Associated Press, October 24, 1981, retrieved on November 17, 2008.
- "Long Live Ho Chi Minh." Guardian Independent Radical Newsweekly, Section 2; Part 1; Page 1, September 13, 1969, retrieved on November 22, 2008.
- Montgomery, Paul L. "Last of Radical Leaders Eluded Police 11 Years," The New York Times, Section 1; Part 1; Page 38, Column 1, October 25, 1981, retrieved on November 10, 2008.
- Raskin, Jonah. Out of the Whale: Growing Up in the American Left: an Autobiography. (Fox Publishing: New York, 1974).
- Environmental Law Virtual Guest Speaker Biography: Public Nuisance or Political Question? A Case Study of Connecticut v. American Electric Power, Virtual Guest Speaker Program, March 27, 2006. Retrieved from https://web.archive.org/web/20080906233814/http://www.law.mercer.edu/elaw/stein.html November 8, 2008.
- FBI Files: Weather Underground Organization (Weathermen) Retrieved from http://foia.fbi.gov November 9, 2008.
- Free Huey!: "You Can Jail a Revolutionary, But You Can't Jail the Revolution" Retrieved from November 17, 2008
