= Annie Stein =

American civil rights activist (1913–1981)

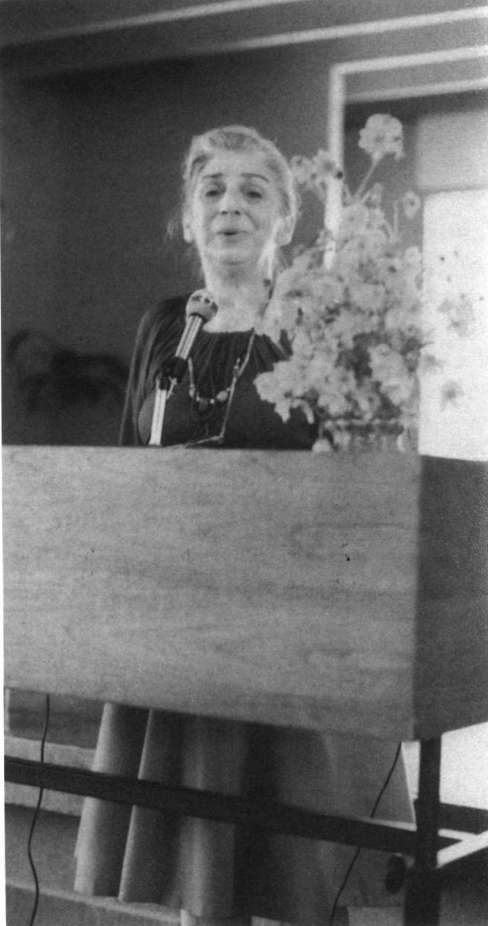
- Annie Stein (August 1979) at memorial service for David Rein (co-counsel to the Coordinating Committee)
- Born: Annie Steckler; March 3, 1913; Brooklyn, New York
- Died: May 13, 1981 (aged 68)
- Spouse: Arthur Stein (activist)
- Children: Eleanor Raskin
- Parent: Philip Steckler
- Relatives: Thai Jones

Annie Stein was a civil rights activist who focused on desegregating Washington, D.C. theaters, restaurants and department stores.

== Background ==
Annie Steckler was born in Brooklyn, New York. Her parents were Ukrainian immigrants; her father's name was Philip Steckler, born in (1875–1925) in Romny, Ukraine. She had two sisters, Frieda and Sylvia. Annie Stein was no outsider to the hardships faced by the racially and economically oppressed. Stein grew up in the midst of poverty, witnessing first hand her own parents' struggle to feed and support her. She earned a scholarship to Hunter College. In the mid-1930s, while attending Hunter, Stein left her studies for Washington to defend the Scottsboro Boys, nine African-American boys falsely accused of raping two white women. The protest became the first in a long career of activism that made Stein a noteworthy historical figure. After finishing her studies, Stein returned to Washington and dedicate her life's work to fighting the injustices perpetuated by discrimination in employment, public spaces and schools.

== Career ==
Stein's work in Washington, D.C. began with a governmental position at the Works Progress Administration. In the late 1930s, deciding that activism was more important, Stein left her career at the Administration to become the chair of the Women's Trade Union League. As chair, Stein devoted her time to labor organizing and protest. After the United States joined World War II, Stein joined the Congress of Industrial Organizations at the Office of Price Administration to fight war time inflation. Her committee monitored grocery store and restaurant owners to make sure that they observed ceiling prices. In a culminating effort against inflation, Stein joined the Washington Committee for Consumer Protection (WCCP) and organized a citywide strike against the rising wartime prices of food and service. During her protests with the WCCP, Stein used progressive tactics such as boycotting and picketing in front of the stores that increased their price on meat and milk. Stein's picket signs featured the slogan: "Don't buy meat over six cents a pound". Receiving over 40,000 signatures, Stein submitted a petition to legislators that stabilized the price of milk and meat for a few weeks. Stein's career reached a major milestone when she met Mary Church Terrell in the battle against anti-discrimination in the nation's capital.

In the mid-1940s, Stein and Terrell were both actively fighting the continued segregation in the District's restaurants, theaters, and shopping centers. Together they created the Coordinating Committee for the Enforcement of the D.C Anti-Discrimination Laws to formally address racial discrimination. In the Coordinating Committee, Stein served as secretary to Terrell who considered her, "the greatest secretary in the world". The Coordinating Committee used the claims made by the D.C. Chapter of the National Lawyers Guild about the "lost laws" of 1872, to fuel their direct action protests against segregation. The "lost laws" effectively eliminated segregation in the city, but had been dropped from the District code. The Guild argued that laws were still valid.

=== District of Columbia v. John R. Thompson Co. case ===
One of Stein's most influential protests with the Coordinating Committee occurred on January 27, 1950. The committee sent an interracial party to Thompson's restaurant to seek service. The owner rejected the party, stating: "We don't serve colored" according to witness Marvin Caplan, the chairman of the Coordinating Committee's Publicity Committee. The Coordinating Committee sought support from the D.C. corporation counsel to uphold the "lost laws" arguing that Thompson's had violated the District of Columbia's Criminal Code by refusing to serve an interracial party.

According to the "lost laws", a business should serve "any respectable, well-behaved person without regard to race, color or previous condition of servitude". The Coordinating Committee pursued legal action in the case of District of Columbia v. John R. Thompson Co., validate the "lost laws", but for more than two years, the courts refused to hear the case. The case was finally successfully reintroduced in 1953 with the support of President Dwight Eisenhower, a strong civil rights activist, and on June 8, 1953, the court unanimously made the anti-discrimination laws valid. These anti-discrimination laws, now known as the Civil Rights Act, formally put a legal end to discrimination in Washington, a major victory for the committee.

=== Trailway Bus Line's fountain counter incident ===
Stein was not always successful. The Trailway Bus Line's fountain counter incident demonstrated one of Stein's protests that did not result in a positive racial change. The management of a six-stooled bus station bus fountain counter refused to serve blacks, prompting demands from the Coordination Committee to integrate the counter. The committee cited the now enforceable "lost laws" in their case. Grudgingly the fountain counter managers began accepting black customers, however in response, the stools were removed so that "white and black alike stand up for their cokes." Stein relates the ironic way in which "democracy was achieved" in a critique appearing in the Washington Post: "It seems to me that this incident is symbolic of the deprivations we whites endure to nourish our ugly prejudices."

After leading a successful activist career in Washington for more than a decade, Stein returned to New York in the mid-1950s to reunite with family. In New York Stein continued her commitment to activism and protest for social justice.

=== Career in New York ===
After her triumph in legalizing the anti-discrimination laws with the Coordinating Committee, Stein veered her political activism towards schooling. In 1953, Stein moved to Brooklyn, New York and joined the Parents Teacher Association(PTA) where she fought against the inequality of schooling. Stein tried all political avenues to secure a better education for the inner city's predominantly black and Puerto Rican, low-income children. She encouraged the councilmen to allow open enrolment in schools and mass transfers, considering that any change would elevate the quality of education for poor children. In 1964 Stein launched her biggest assault against the unyielding school system. Joining the community together, she called for a one-day boycott on the school system, and on Freedom Day, February 3, 1964 half a million children skipped school. Although the boycott was more of a symbolic success then a policy changing one, the majority support that Stein achieved demonstrated the inner city community's firm intentions on achieving educational equality. Stein's efforts in pushing for integration and equality was opposed by conservative whites who refused to put their children in integrated schools and school boards that remained indifferent in raising the quality education for blacks and Hispanics.

Stein firmly believed that racism in schools reflected the larger failings of society stating:

If racism in the society at large becomes reflected in school policies", she said in one report, "remedy must be sought through continuing and extending the battle against racism in society as a whole and by protecting the child from this racism. School policies and attitudes cannot be permitted to continue to reflect society's racism."

Stein continued to be an advocate for the disadvantaged until her death. In the 1970s Stein won a slot as the legislative aide to the Rev. Milton A. Galamison, vice chairman of the New York City Board of Education. She used this position to continue her goal of decentralizing the city's school systems and advocating citywide school integration.

== Personal life and death ==
On August 12, 1933, Annie Steckler married Arthur Stein (activist). In 1942, they had a son, Philip Steckler Stein, and daughter, Eleanor Raskin.

Annie Stein died age 68 on May 13, 1981, from cancer.

== Legacy and ideology ==
Stein's strategy was "Negotiate, boycott, picket." She claimed that this three-part strategy worked to raise awareness about discriminatory institutions, and apply social pressure to effect policy change. Her work with revolutionary and forward thinking activists Mary Church Terrell and Ella Baker, who further developed her philosophy on social justice. Stein embraced radical politics and communism throughout her political career. In her activism for racial and gender equality, she believed that "If fighting for lower tuition fees, for the rights of the Negro, for higher wages for student workers, for lower prices for the lunch room – if that be a Red then let's be Reds". Her communist politics haunted her for the rest of her career especially during the Cold War under McCarthyism. Stein's husband Arthur Stein was also an active member of the communist party and refused to collaborate with the House Un-American Activities Committee. Stein's daughter Eleanor upheld her mother's tradition of resistance in the 1960s leading the Weather Underground, a radical Anti-Vietnam War movement.
