= Freedom Day (Belarus) =

Unofficial holiday in Belarus

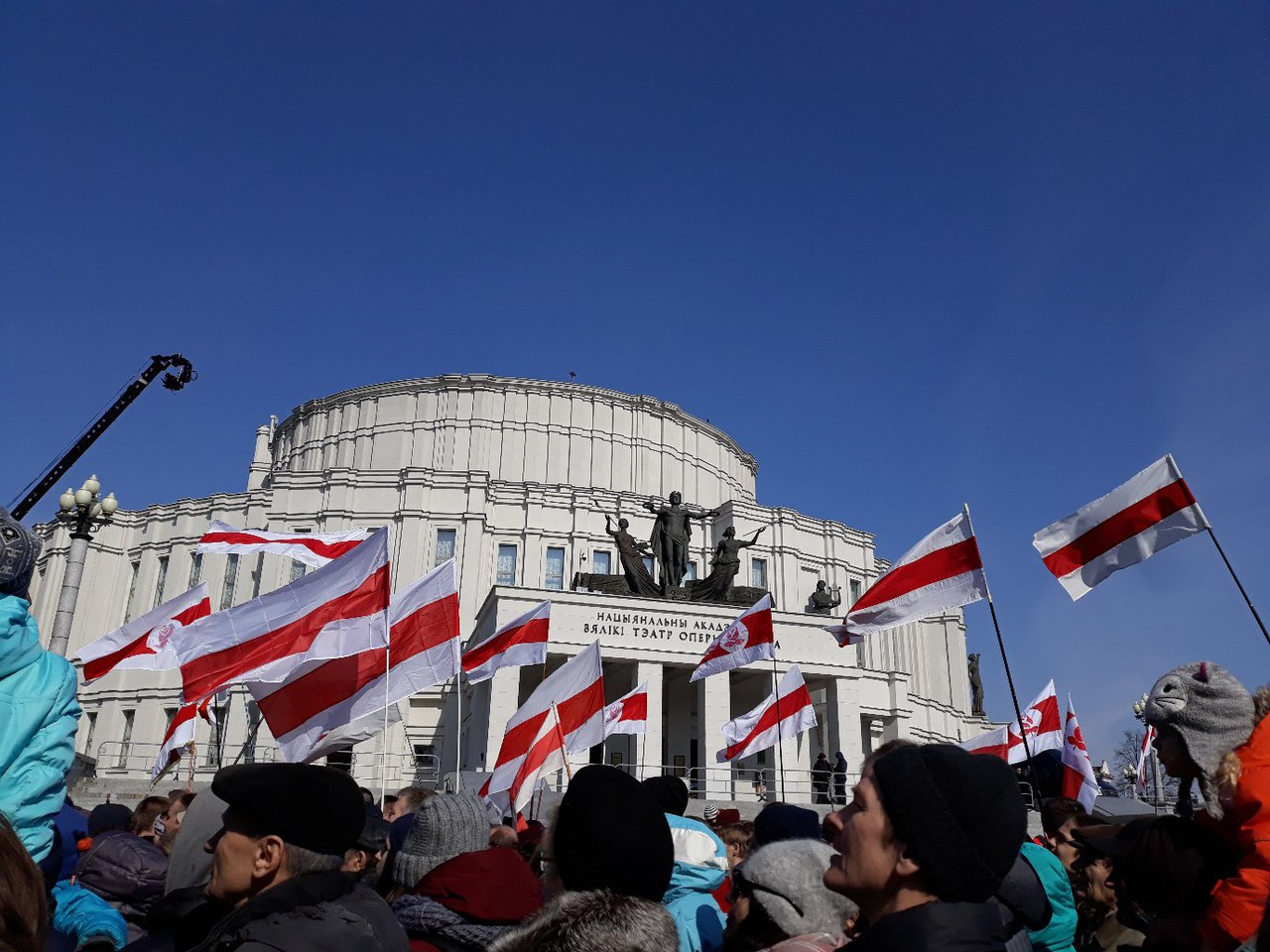
- Freedom Day demonstration in front of the National Opera and Ballet of Belarus building in Minsk in 2018
- Official name: Дзень Волі
- Observed by: Belarus, Belarusian diaspora
- Date: 25 March
- Frequency: annual
- Related to: Declaration of independence by the Belarusian Democratic Republic in 1918

Freedom Day (Belarusian: Дзень Волі, romanized: Dzień Voli; Russian: День Воли, romanized: Den' voli) is an unofficial holiday in Belarus celebrated on 25 March to commemorate the declaration of independence by the Belarusian Democratic Republic by the Third Constituent Charter on that date in 1918. It is also known as the 25-aha sakavika (Belarusian: 25-ага сакавіка, March 25) day.

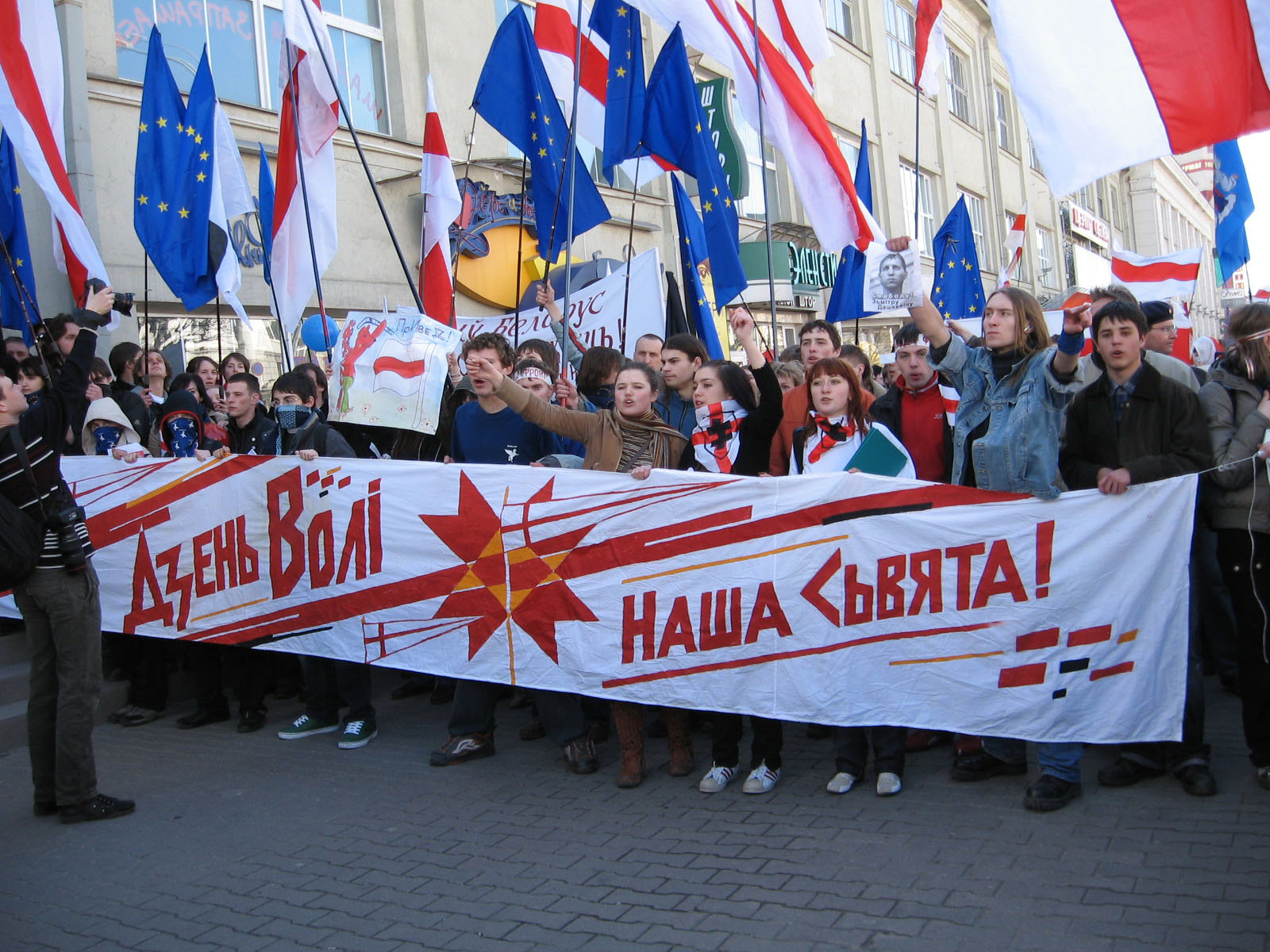
Freedom Day celebration rally held by the Belarusian opposition in 2007

The Belarusian opposition to the regime of Alexander Lukashenko celebrates Freedom Day annually. The protests in Belarus are regularly accompanied by mass detention and torture of the protesters. The government does not recognize Freedom Day claiming that the Belarusian Democratic Republic was created by the Germans, which occupied Belarus in 1918 and with Lukashenko describing it as a "dismal page in our history". However, since the 2018 event which marked the centenary of the BDR, the authorities have somewhat rolled back some the crackdowns and criticism - in 2018 authorities granted a permission to organize a ceremony and concert in Minsk with 11,000 attendants, and in 2019 events in Minsk and the regions took place without large-scale repression.

In 2020, Belarusian musician Źmicier Vajciuškievič created a song commemorated to the day and named it "25aha sakavika".

Freedom Day 2021 was the last day of protest marches against the alleged fraudulent 2020 Belarusian presidential election. More than 200 people were arrested.

On May 16, 2024, the Investigative Committee of Belarus announced that criminal cases had been opened against participants of the 2024 emigrant celebrations under articles of the criminal code on the creation of an extremist group and participation in it and on discrediting the Republic of Belarus. The Investigative Committee announced that it has information about 104 persons who participated in the celebration of Freedom Day in various cities abroad, and also announced searches, seizures of property and proceedings in absentia against the suspects.

== See also ==
- Public holidays in Belarus
- Freedom Day (disambiguation) in other countries
