= United States Civil Service Commission v. National Ass'n of Letter Carriers =

U.S. Civil Service Commission v. National Association of Letter Carriers
- Supreme Court of the United States

Argued March 26, 1973 Decided June 25, 1973
- Full case name: United States Civil Service Commission, et al. v. National Association of Letter Carriers, AFL-CIO, et al.
- Citations: 413 U.S. 548 (more) 93 S.Ct. 2880; 37 L. Ed. 2d 796; 1973 U.S. LEXIS 146

Case history
- Prior: Appeal from the U.S. District Court for the District of Columbia

Holding
- The Hatch Act of 1939 does not violate the First Amendment, and its implementing regulations are not unconstitutionally vague and overbroad.

Court membership
- Chief Justice Warren E. Burger Associate Justices William O. Douglas · William J. Brennan Jr. Potter Stewart · Byron White; Thurgood Marshall · Harry Blackmun; Lewis F. Powell Jr. · William Rehnquist

Case opinions
- Majority: White, joined by Burger, Stewart, Blackmun, Powell, Rehnquist
- Dissent: Douglas, joined by Brennan, Marshall

United States Civil Service Commission v. National Association of Letter Carriers, 413 U.S. 548 (1973), is a ruling by the United States Supreme Court which held that the Hatch Act of 1939 does not violate the First Amendment, and its implementing regulations are not unconstitutionally vague and overbroad.

== Background ==
In 1939, the United States Congress passed the Hatch Act, which barred federal employees from taking part in political campaigns. In United Public Workers v. Mitchell, 330 U.S. 75 (1947), the U.S. Supreme Court had held that the Act did not violate the First, Fifth, Ninth, or Tenth amendments to U.S. Constitution. The same day, in Oklahoma v. United States Civil Service Commission, 330 U.S. 127 (1947), the Court rejected a similar Tenth Amendment challenge to the Act.

In 1971, six federal employees, the National Association of Letter Carriers, and six local Democratic and Republican political committees sought an injunction against the enforcement of the Hatch Act on the grounds that the law violated their First Amendment rights and was unconstitutionally vague.

The United States District Court for the District of Columbia ruled that United Public Workers v. Mitchell had left the constitutionality of the term "political activity" open to question. The District Court then found that the term was impermissibly vague and overbroad. The District Court then argued that, even if United Public Workers had foreclosed any discussion of the constitutionality of the term, subsequent Supreme Court decisions regarding the rights of federal workers had undermined the decision and left the door open for the District Court to re-examine the Act's constitutionality.

The federal government appealed to the U.S. Supreme Court, which granted certiorari.

== Decision ==
=== Majority opinion ===
Associate Justice Byron White wrote the decision for the majority.

Justice White began by noting that while the plaintiffs in United Public Workers had only made vague assertions of the kind of political activity they wished to engage in, the plaintiffs in the present case had clearly outlined the activities they believed were unconstitutionally barred by the Hatch Act. White then "unhesitatingly reaffirm[ed] the Mitchell holding". White reviewed the lengthy history in the U.S. of barring political activity by federal workers, a practice which extended to the presidency of Thomas Jefferson, and emphasized the considered and lengthy history of the conclusion that such activity was highly dangerous to the proper functioning of government and democracy.

But, citing Pickering v. Board of Education, 391 U.S. 563, 568 (1968), White noted that the government has a special and unique interest in regulating the speech of federal workers. This special interest is not in question; rather, balancing this interest against the rights of workers is the key. Calling "the impartial execution of the laws" the "great end of Government", White asserted that not only is the actual impartiality of government but its appearance both justify the infringement of the rights of federal workers.

White next turned to the issue of vagueness. White reviewed the adoption of the 1939 Act, the rulemaking of the United States Civil Service Commission between 1939 and 1940 (which defined many specific political acts barred by the 1939 legislation), and the adoption by Congress of amendments to the Hatch Act in 1940 which strictly limited the Civil Service Commission's rulemaking powers regarding the Act (as amended) but which also incorporated (almost, but not quite) the rules already promulgated by the Commission. White concluded that these "prohibitions sufficiently clearly carve out the prohibited political conduct from the expressive activity permitted by the prior section to survive any attack on the ground of vagueness".

The judgment of the District Court was reversed.

=== Douglas' dissent ===
Associate Justice William O. Douglas dissented, joined by Associate Justices William J. Brennan, Jr. and Thurgood Marshall.

Douglas rejected the majority's conclusion that the Hatch Act of 1939 (as amended in 1940) was constitutionally not vague. He noted that more than 3,000 rulings of the Civil Service Commission had been made between the first adoption of the prohibition on political activity in 1886 and 1940, along with 800 decisions since then. The sheer mass of decisions indicated that the legislation's phrase "political activity" was vague. But Douglas also noted that many of the decisions and rulings were themselves unclear and vague. "The chilling effect of these vague and generalized prohibitions," Douglas concluded, "is so obvious as not to need elaboration."

Douglas observed that the Supreme Court had already abandoned the "doctrine of privilege" defense for the Hatch Act, and had only in 1972 held "that Government employment may not be denied or penalized "on a basis that infringes [the employee's] constitutionally protected interests -- especially, his interest in freedom of speech." Douglas equated freedom of speech with freedom of religion, and concluded that "speech, assembly, and petition are as deeply embedded in the First Amendment as proselytizing a religious cause." If the Court would not condition public employment based on a religious test, it should not therefore base employment on a political test (e.g., nonpartisanship).

Douglas agreed with the District Court that a number of Supreme Court decisions since United Public Workers had called into question the Hatch Act's constitutionality. For Douglas, the majority's long discussion of the 1940 amendments boiled down to one thing: Congress had refused to delegate to the Civil Service Commission the authority to regulate First Amendment rights, and this fatally left the Act uninterpreted and thus unconstitutionally vague.

Douglas would have struck down the Act as "self-imposed censorship imposed on many nervous people who live on narrow economic margins."

== Assessment ==
In the 19th century, American courts had established the "doctrine of privilege." This legal doctrine concluded that public employment was a privilege, not a right, and subsequently significant restrictions could be placed on public employees that could not be constitutionally tolerated in the private sector. By the middle of the 20th century, however, the doctrine of privilege had been markedly weakened. Abuse of the privilege had led to widespread corruption; the tolerance of sexual harassment, racism, religious discrimination, and gender discrimination; and workplace abuse (such as forcing employees to buy goods and services from a supervisor, or forcing employees to run errands for the supervisor). The courts were becoming less and less tolerant of the doctrine of privilege.

United Public Workers v. Mitchell was the last time the Supreme Court expansively applied the doctrine of privilege. The Supreme Court largely rejected the doctrine in Wieman v. Updegraff, 344 U.S. 183 (1952), and a number of high court decisions in areas such as nonpartisan speech, due process, search and seizure, the right to marry, the right to bear children, equal protection, education, and receipt of public benefits over the next two decades continued to undermine the concept. Although the Supreme Court reaffirmed United Public Workers v. Mitchell in United States Civil Service Commission v. National Association of Letter Carriers, it abandoned its reliance on the doctrine of privilege and did so narrowly on the grounds that permitting public employees to engage in political activity was dangerous to democracy.

== Bibliography ==
- Menez, Joseph Francis; Vile, John R.; and Bartholomew, Paul Charles. Summaries of Leading Cases on the Constitution. Lanham, Md.: Rowman & Littlefield, 2003.
- Moore, Wayne D. Constitutional Rights and Powers of the People. Princeton, N.J.: Princeton University Press, 1996.
- Rabin, Jack; Hildreth, W. Bartley; and Miller, Gerald J., eds. Handbook of Public Administration. 3d ed. Washington, D.C.: CRC Press, 2006.
- Rosenbloom, David and O'Leary, Rosemary. Public Administration and Law. 2d ed. Washington, D.C.: CRC Press, 1996.
