= Article Three of the United States Constitution =

Portion of the US Constitution regarding the judicial branch

Article Three of the United States Constitution establishes the judicial branch of the U.S. federal government. Under Article Three, the judicial branch consists of the Supreme Court of the United States, as well as lower courts created by Congress. Article Three empowers the courts to handle cases or controversies arising under federal law, as well as other enumerated areas. Article Three also defines treason.

Section 1 of Article Three vests the judicial power of the United States in "one supreme Court", as well as "inferior courts" established by Congress. Section 1 authorizes the creation of inferior courts, but does not require it; the first inferior federal courts were established shortly after the ratification of the Constitution with the Judiciary Act of 1789. Section 1 also establishes that federal judges do not face term limits, and that an individual judge's salary may not be decreased. Article Three does not set the size of the Supreme Court or establish specific positions on the court, but Article One establishes the position of chief justice. (Note: Section 3, Clause 6) Along with the Vesting Clauses of Article One and Article Two, Article Three's Vesting Clause establishes the separation of powers among the three branches of government.

Section 2 of Article Three delineates federal judicial power. The Case or Controversy Clause restricts the judiciary's power to actual cases and controversies, meaning that federal judicial power does not extend to cases which are hypothetical, or which are proscribed due to standing, mootness, or ripeness issues. Section 2 states that the federal judiciary's power extends to cases arising under the Constitution, federal laws, federal treaties, controversies involving multiple states or foreign powers, and other enumerated areas. Section 2 gives the Supreme Court original jurisdiction when ambassadors, public officials, or the states are a party in the case, leaving the Supreme Court with appellate jurisdiction in all other areas to which the federal judiciary's jurisdiction extends. Section 2 also gives Congress the power to strip the Supreme Court of appellate jurisdiction, and establishes that all federal crimes must be tried before a jury. Section 2 does not expressly grant the federal judiciary the power of judicial review, but the courts have exercised this power since the 1803 case of Marbury v. Madison.

Section 3 of Article Three defines treason and empowers Congress to punish treason. Section 3 requires that at least two witnesses testify to the treasonous act, or that the individual accused of treason confess in open court. It also limits the ways in which Congress can punish those convicted of treason.

== Background ==
Unlike the Articles of Confederation, the US Constitution separated the legislative, executive and judicial powers. Article III separates and places the judicial power in the judiciary. This idea is most often attributed to Montesquieu. Although not the progenitor, Montesquieu's writing on the separation of power in The Spirit of Laws was immensely influential on the U.S. Constitution.

== Section 1: Federal courts ==
Section 1 is one of the three vesting clauses of the United States Constitution, which vests the judicial power of the United States in federal courts, requires the supreme court, allows inferior courts, requires good behavior tenure for judges, and prohibits decreasing the salaries of judges.

The judicial Power of the United States, shall be vested in one supreme Court, and in such inferior Courts as the Congress may from time to time ordain and establish. The Judges, both of the supreme and inferior Courts, shall hold their Offices during good Behaviour, and shall, at stated Times, receive for their Services a Compensation which shall not be diminished during their Continuance in Office.

The Committee of Detail report reads slightly differently:

The Judicial Power of the United States shall be vested in one supreme Court, and in such Inferior Courts as shall, when necessary, from time to time, be constituted by the Legislature of the United States.

=== Clause 1: Vesting of judicial power and number of courts ===
Article III authorizes one Supreme Court, but does not set the number of justices that must be appointed to it. Article One, Section 3, Clause 6 refers to a "chief justice" (who shall preside over the impeachment trial of the president of the United States). After the Judiciary Act of 1869, the number of justices has been fixed at nine: one chief justice, and eight associate justices.

Proposals have been made at various times for organizing the Supreme Court into separate panels; none garnered wide support, and thus the constitutionality of such a division is unknown. In a 1937 letter to Senator Burton Wheeler during the Judicial Procedures Reform Bill debate, Chief Justice Charles Evans Hughes wrote, "the Constitution does not appear to authorize two or more Supreme Courts functioning in effect as separate courts."

The Supreme Court is the only federal court that is explicitly established by the Constitution. During the Constitutional Convention, a proposal was made for the Supreme Court to be the only federal court, having both original jurisdiction and appellate jurisdiction. This proposal was rejected in favor of the provision that exists today. The Supreme Court has interpreted this provision as enabling Congress to create inferior (i.e., lower) courts under both Article III, Section 1, and Article I, Section 8. The Article III courts, which are also known as "constitutional courts", were first created by the Judiciary Act of 1789, and are the only courts with judicial power. Article I courts, which are also known as "legislative courts", consist of regulatory agencies, such as the United States Tax Court.

In certain types of cases, Article III courts may exercise appellate jurisdiction over Article I courts. In Murray's Lessee v. Hoboken Land & Improvement Co. (59 U.S. (18 How.) 272 (1856)), the Court held that "there are legal matters, involving public rights, which may be presented in such form that the judicial power is capable of acting on them", and which are susceptible to review by an Article III court. Later, in Ex parte Bakelite Corp. (279 U.S. 438 (1929)), the Court declared that Article I courts "may be created as special tribunals to examine and determine various matters, arising between the government and others, which from their nature do not require judicial determination and yet are susceptible of it." Other cases, such as bankruptcy cases, have been held not to involve judicial determination, and may therefore go before Article I courts. Similarly, several courts in the District of Columbia, which is under the exclusive jurisdiction of the Congress, are Article I courts rather than Article III courts. This article was expressly extended to the United States District Court for the District of Puerto Rico by the U.S. Congress through Federal Law 89-571, 80 Stat. 764, signed by President Lyndon B. Johnson in 1966. This transformed the article IV United States territorial court in Puerto Rico, created in 1900, to an Article III federal judicial district court. US military judges and US immigration judges are also not part of Article III courts.

The Judicial Procedures Reform Bill of 1937, frequently called the court-packing plan, was a legislative initiative to add more justices to the Supreme Court proposed by President Franklin D. Roosevelt shortly after his victory in the 1936 presidential election. Although the bill aimed generally to overhaul and modernize the entire federal court system, its central and most controversial provision would have granted the President power to appoint an additional justice to the Supreme Court for every incumbent justice over the age of 70, up to a maximum of six.

The Constitution is silent when it comes to judges of courts which have been abolished. The Judiciary Act of 1801 increased the number of courts to permit Federalist president John Adams to appoint a number of Federalist judges before Thomas Jefferson took office. When Jefferson became president, the Congress abolished several of these courts and made no provision for the judges of those courts. The Judicial Code of 1911 abolished circuit riding and transferred the circuit courts authority and jurisdiction to the district courts.

=== Clause 2: Tenure ===
The Constitution provides that judges "shall hold their Offices during good Behaviour". The term "good behaviour" is interpreted to mean that judges may serve for the remainder of their lives, although they may resign or retire voluntarily. A judge may also be removed by impeachment and conviction by congressional vote (hence the term good behavior); this has occurred fourteen times. Three other judges – Mark W. Delahay, George W. English, and Samuel B. Kent – chose to resign rather than go through the impeachment process.

=== Clause 3: Salaries ===
The compensation of judges may be increased, but not decreased, during their continuance in office. However, Congress may alter a promised future increase before it becomes effective. Thus, in United States v. Will, the court held that Congress could repeal or modify a statutorily defined formula for annual cost-of-living increases to the compensation of federal judges, but Congress must act with respect to any particular increase before the increase takes effect.

== Section 2: Judicial power, jurisdiction, and trial by jury ==
Section 2 delineates federal judicial power, and brings that power into execution by conferring original jurisdiction and also appellate jurisdiction upon the Supreme Court. Additionally, this section requires trial by jury in all criminal cases, except impeachment cases.

The judicial Power shall extend to all Cases, in Law and Equity, arising under this Constitution, the Laws of the United States, and Treaties made, or which shall be made, under their Authority;—to all Cases affecting Ambassadors, other public Ministers and Consuls;—to all Cases of admiralty and maritime Jurisdiction;—to Controversies to which the United States shall be a Party;—to Controversies between two or more States;—between a State and Citizens of another State;—between Citizens of different States;—between Citizens of the same State claiming Lands under Grants of different States, and between a State, or the Citizens thereof, and foreign States, Citizens or Subjects.

In all Cases affecting Ambassadors, other public Ministers and Consuls, and those in which a State shall be Party, the supreme Court shall have original Jurisdiction. In all the other Cases before mentioned, the supreme Court shall have appellate Jurisdiction, both as to Law and Fact, with such Exceptions, and under such Regulations as the Congress shall make.

Trial of all Crimes, except in Cases of Impeachment, shall be by Jury; and such Trial shall be held in the State where the said Crimes shall have been committed; but when not committed within any State, the Trial shall be at such Place or Places as the Congress may by Law have directed.

=== Clause 1: Cases and controversies ===
Clause 1 of Section 2 authorizes the federal courts to hear actual cases and controversies only. Their judicial power does not extend to cases which are hypothetical, or which are proscribed due to standing, mootness, or ripeness issues. Generally, a case or controversy requires the presence of adverse parties who have a genuine interest at stake in the case. In Muskrat v. United States, 219 U.S. 346 (1911), the Supreme Court denied jurisdiction to cases brought under a statute permitting certain Native Americans to bring suit against the United States to determine the constitutionality of a law allocating tribal lands. Counsel for both sides were to be paid from the federal Treasury. The Supreme Court held that, though the United States was a defendant, the case in question was not an actual controversy; rather, the statute was merely devised to test the constitutionality of a certain type of legislation. Thus the Court's ruling would be nothing more than an advisory opinion; therefore, the court dismissed the suit for failing to present a "case or controversy."

A significant omission is that although Clause 1 provides that federal judicial power shall extend to "the laws of the United States," it does not also provide that it shall extend to the laws of the several or individual states. In turn, the Judiciary Act of 1789 and subsequent acts never granted the U.S. Supreme Court the power to review decisions of state supreme courts on pure issues of state law. It is this silence which tacitly made state supreme courts the final expositors of the common law in their respective states. They were free to diverge from English precedents and from each other on the vast majority of legal issues which had never been made part of federal law by the Constitution, and the U.S. Supreme Court could do nothing, as it would ultimately concede in Erie Railroad Co. v. Tompkins (1938). By way of contrast, other English-speaking federations like Australia and Canada never adopted the Erie doctrine. That is, their highest courts have always possessed plenary power to impose a uniform nationwide common law upon all lower courts and never adopted the strong American distinction between federal and state common law.

=== Eleventh Amendment and state sovereign immunity ===
In Chisholm v. Georgia, 2 U.S. 419 (1793), the Supreme Court ruled that Article III, Section 2 abrogated the states' sovereign immunity and authorized federal courts to hear disputes between private citizens and States. This decision was overturned by the Eleventh Amendment, which was passed by the Congress on March 4, 1794, 1 Stat. 402 and ratified by the states on February 7, 1795. It prohibits the federal courts from hearing "any suit in law or equity, commenced or prosecuted against one of the United States by Citizens of another State, or by Citizens or Subjects of any Foreign State".

=== Clause 2: Original and appellate jurisdiction ===
Clause 2 of Section 2 provides that the Supreme Court has original jurisdiction in cases affecting ambassadors, ministers and consuls, and also in those controversies which are subject to federal judicial power because at least one state is a party; the Court has held that the latter requirement is met if the United States has a controversy with a state. In other cases, the Supreme Court has only appellate jurisdiction, which may be regulated by the Congress. The Congress may not, however, amend the Court's original jurisdiction, as was found in Marbury v. Madison, 5 U.S. (1 Cranch) 137 (1803) (the same decision which established the principle of judicial review). Marbury held that Congress can neither expand nor restrict the original jurisdiction of the Supreme Court. However, the appellate jurisdiction of the Court is different. The Court's appellate jurisdiction is given "with such exceptions, and under such regulations as the Congress shall make." By this clause, the Supreme Court upheld in 1869 that a former Confederate soldier could not appeal his suit for a writ of habeas corpus to that Court, because Congress had exempted such suits from its appellate jurisdiction, in Ex parte McCardle.

Often a court will assert a modest degree of power over a case for the threshold purpose of determining whether it has jurisdiction, and so the word "power" is not necessarily synonymous with the word "jurisdiction".

=== Judicial review ===
The power of the federal judiciary to review the constitutionality of a statute or treaty, or to review an administrative regulation for consistency with either a statute, a treaty, or the Constitution itself, is an implied power derived in part from Clause 2 of Section 2.

Though the Constitution does not expressly provide that the federal judiciary has the power of judicial review, many of the Constitution's Framers viewed such a power as an appropriate power for the federal judiciary to possess. In Federalist No. 78, Alexander Hamilton wrote,

The interpretation of the laws is the proper and peculiar province of the courts. A constitution, is, in fact, and must be regarded by the judges, as a fundamental law. It therefore belongs to them to ascertain its meaning, as well as the meaning of any particular act proceeding from the legislative body. If there should happen to be an irreconcilable variance between two, that which has the superior obligation and validity ought, of course, to be preferred; or, in other words, the constitution ought to be preferred to the statute, the intention of the people to the intention of their agents.

Hamilton goes on to counterbalance the tone of "judicial supremacists," those demanding that both Congress and the executive are compelled by the Constitution to enforce all court decisions, including those that, in their eyes, or those of the People, violate fundamental American principles:

Nor does this conclusion by any means suppose a superiority of the judicial to the legislative power. It only supposes that the power of the people is superior to both; and that where the will of the legislature, declared in its statutes, stands in opposition to that of the people, declared in the Constitution, the judges ought to be governed by the latter rather than the former. They ought to regulate their decisions by the fundamental laws, rather than by those which are not fundamental. It can be of no weight to say that the courts, on the pretense of a repugnancy, may substitute their own pleasure to the constitutional intentions of the legislature. This might as well happen in the case of two contradictory statutes; or it might as well happen in every adjudication upon any single statute. The courts must declare the sense of the law; and if they should be disposed to exercise will instead of judgement, the consequence would equally be the substitution of their pleasure to that of the legislative body. The observation, if it prove any thing, would prove that there ought to be no judges distinct from that body.

Marbury v. Madison involved a highly partisan set of circumstances. Though congressional elections were held in November 1800, the newly elected officers did not take power until March. The Federalist Party had lost the elections. In the words of President Thomas Jefferson, the Federalists "retired into the judiciary as a stronghold". In the four months following the elections, the outgoing Congress created several new judgeships, which were filled by President John Adams. In the last-minute rush, however, Federalist secretary of state John Marshall had neglected to deliver 17 of the commissions to their respective appointees. When James Madison took office as Secretary of State, several commissions remained undelivered. Bringing their claims under the Judiciary Act of 1789, the appointees, including William Marbury, petitioned the Supreme Court for the issue of a writ of mandamus, which in English law had been used to force public officials to fulfill their ministerial duties. Here, Madison would be required to deliver the commissions.

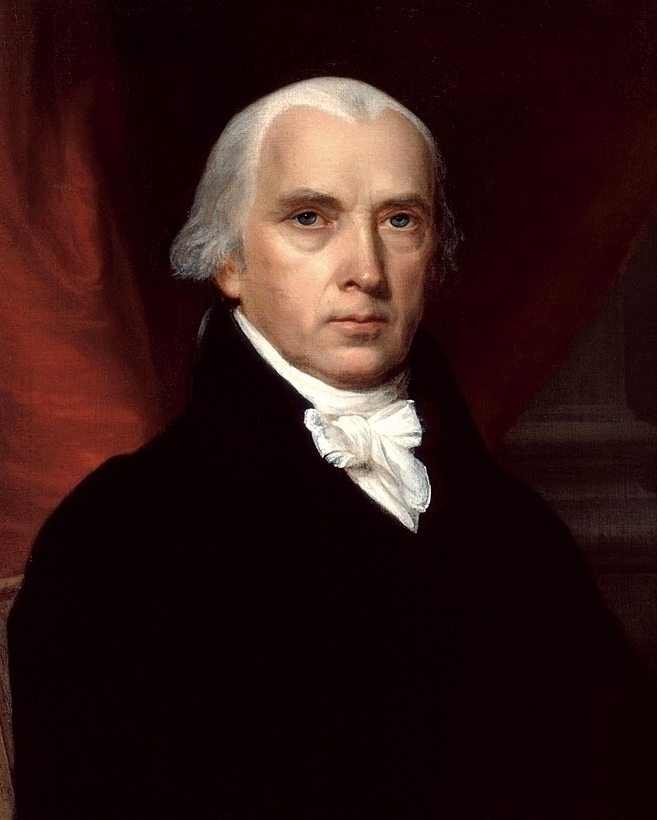
Secretary of State James Madison, who won Marbury v. Madison, but lost judicial review

Marbury posed a difficult problem for the court, which was then led by Chief Justice John Marshall, the same person who had neglected to deliver the commissions when he was the Secretary of State. If Marshall's court commanded James Madison to deliver the commissions, Madison might ignore the order, thereby indicating the weakness of the court. Similarly, if the court denied William Marbury's request, the court would be seen as weak. Marshall held that appointee Marbury was indeed entitled to his commission. However, Justice Marshall contended that the Judiciary Act of 1789 was unconstitutional, since it purported to grant original jurisdiction to the Supreme Court in cases not involving the States or ambassadors. The ruling thereby established that the federal courts could exercise judicial review over the actions of Congress or the executive branch.

However, Alexander Hamilton, in Federalist No. 78, expressed the view that the Courts hold only the power of words, and not the power of compulsion upon those other two branches of government, upon which the Supreme Court is itself dependent. Then in 1820, Thomas Jefferson expressed his deep reservations about the doctrine of judicial review:

You seem ... to consider the judges as the ultimate arbiters of all constitutional questions; a very dangerous doctrine indeed, and one which would place us under the despotism of an oligarchy. Our judges are as honest as other men, and not more so. They have, with others, the same passions for party, for power, and the privilege of their corps ... Their power [is] the more dangerous as they are in office for life, and not responsible, as the other functionaries are, to the elective control. The Constitution has erected no such single tribunal, knowing that to whatever hands confided, with the corruptions of time and party, its members would become despots. It has more wisely made all the departments co-equal and co-sovereign within themselves.

=== Clause 3: Federal trials ===
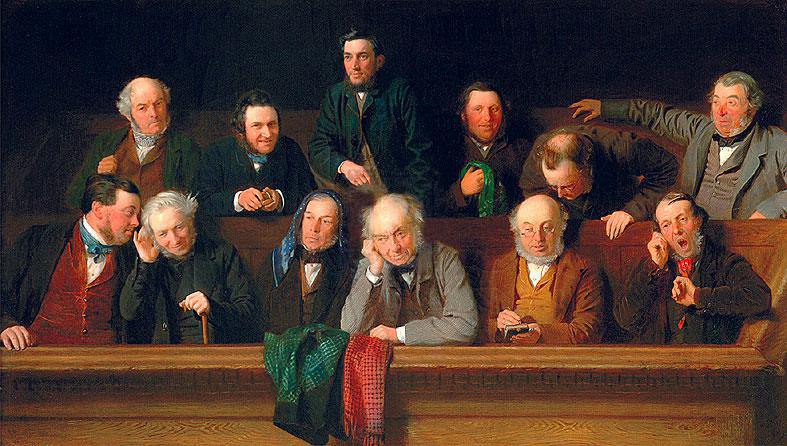
A nineteenth-century painting of a jury

Clause 3 of Section 2 provides that federal crimes, except impeachment cases, must be tried before a jury, unless the defendant waives their right. Also, the trial must be held in the state where the crime was committed. If the crime was not committed in any particular state, then the trial is held in such a place as set forth by the Congress. The United States Senate has the sole power to try impeachment cases.

Two of the constitutional amendments that comprise the Bill of Rights contain related provisions. The Sixth Amendment enumerates the rights of individuals when facing criminal prosecution and the Seventh Amendment establishes an individual's right to a jury trial in certain civil cases. It also inhibits courts from overturning a jury's findings of fact. The Supreme Court has extended the right to a jury in the Sixth Amendment to individuals facing trial in state courts through the Due Process Clause of the Fourteenth Amendment, but has refused to do so with the Seventh.

== Section 3: Treason ==
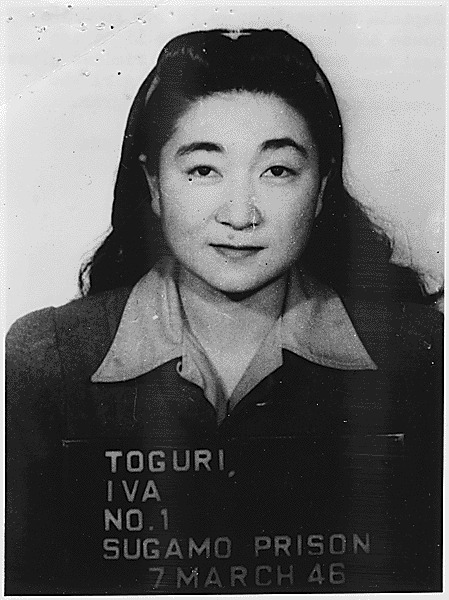
Iva Toguri (pictured), known as Tokyo Rose, and Tomoya Kawakita were two Japanese Americans who were tried for treason after World War II.

Section 3 defines treason and limits its punishment.

Treason against the United States, shall consist only in levying War against them, or in adhering to their Enemies, giving them Aid and Comfort. No Person shall be convicted of Treason unless on the Testimony of two Witnesses to the same overt Act, or on Confession in open Court. The Congress shall have Power to declare the Punishment of Treason, but no Attainder of Treason shall work Corruption of Blood, or Forfeiture except during the Life of the Person attainted.

The Constitution defines treason as specific acts, namely "levying War against [the United States], or in adhering to their Enemies, giving them Aid and Comfort". A contrast is therefore maintained with the English law, whereby crimes including conspiring to kill the king or "violating" the queen were punishable as treason. In Ex parte Bollman, 8 U.S. 75 (1807), the Supreme Court ruled that "there must be an actual assembling of men, for the treasonable purpose, to constitute a levying of war".

Under English law effective during the ratification of the U.S. Constitution, there were several species of treason. Of these, the Constitution adopted only two: levying war and adhering to enemies. Omitted were species of treason involving encompassing (or imagining) the death of the king, certain types of counterfeiting, and finally fornication with women in the royal family of the sort which could call into question the parentage of royal successors. James Wilson wrote the original draft of this section, and he was involved as a defense attorney for some accused of treason against the Patriot cause. The two forms of treason adopted were both derived from the English Treason Act 1351. Joseph Story wrote in his Commentaries on the Constitution of the United States of the authors of the Constitution that:

they have adopted the very words of the Statute of Treason of Edward the Third; and thus by implication, in order to cut off at once all chances of arbitrary constructions, they have recognized the well-settled interpretation of these phrases in the administration of criminal law, which has prevailed for ages.

In Federalist No. 43 James Madison wrote regarding the Treason Clause:

As treason may be committed against the United States, the authority of the United States ought to be enabled to punish it. But as new-fangled and artificial treasons have been the great engines by which violent factions, the natural offspring of free government, have usually wreaked their alternate malignity on each other, the convention have, with great judgment, opposed a barrier to this peculiar danger, by inserting a constitutional definition of the crime, fixing the proof necessary for conviction of it, and restraining the Congress, even in punishing it, from extending the consequences of guilt beyond the person of its author.

Based on the above quotation, it was noted by the lawyer William J. Olson in an amicus curiae in the case Hedges v. Obama that the Treason Clause was one of the enumerated powers of the federal government. He also stated that by defining treason in the U.S. Constitution and placing it in Article III "the founders intended the power to be checked by the judiciary, ruling out trials by military commissions. As James Madison noted, the Treason Clause also was designed to limit the power of the federal government to punish its citizens for 'adhering to [the] enemies [of the United States by], giving them aid and comfort'."

Section 3 also requires the testimony of two different witnesses on the same overt act, or a confession by the accused in open court, to convict for treason. This rule was taken most directly from the English Treason Act 1695, which the Framers' wording closely follows. The English law, however, did not require both witnesses to have witnessed the same overt act; this requirement, supported by Benjamin Franklin, was added to the draft Constitution by a vote of 8 states to 3.

English law first required two witnesses in treason cases in the Treason Act 1547, which borrowed the rule from the ecclesiastical courts. The ecclesiastical courts, in turn, had long grounded the rule in biblical authority, such as Deuteronomy 17:6 and Deuteronomy 19:15. At least one scholar argues that the clause's two-witness rule is therefore ultimately biblical in origin, and the Supreme Court noted the Mosaic antecedent in Cramer v. United States, noting the rule was "a familiar precept of the New Testament, and of Mosaic law". Several American colonies, beginning with the Massachusetts Body of Liberties (1641), required two witnesses in capital cases, and most state treason statutes enacted after 1776 included the requirement.

In Cramer v. United States, 325 U.S. 1 (1945), the Supreme Court ruled that "[e]very act, movement, deed, and word of the defendant charged to constitute treason must be supported by the testimony of two witnesses." In Haupt v. United States, 330 U.S. 631 (1947), however, the Supreme Court found that two witnesses are not required to prove intent, nor are two witnesses required to prove that an overt act is treasonable. The two witnesses, according to the decision, are required to prove only that the overt act occurred (eyewitnesses and federal agents investigating the crime, for example).

Punishment for treason may not "work Corruption of Blood, or Forfeiture except during the Life of the Person" so convicted. The descendants of someone convicted for treason could not, as they were under English law, be considered "tainted" by the treason of their ancestor.

== See also ==
- United States constitutional criminal procedure
- List of current United States circuit judges

== Bibliography ==
- Irons, Peter (1999). A People's History of the Supreme Court. New York: Penguin Books. ISBN 978-0-14-303738-5.
