= Overt act =

Act from which criminal intent can be inferred

In criminal law, an overt act is a criminal act that can be clearly proved by evidence and from which criminal intent can be inferred, as opposed to a mere intention in the mind to commit a crime. Such an act, even if innocent per se, can potentially be used as evidence against someone during a trial to show participation in a crime. For instance, the purchase of a ski mask, which can conceal identity, is generally a legal act but may be an overt act if it is purchased in the planning of a bank robbery.

== Content ==
The term is more particularly employed in cases of treason, which must be demonstrated by some overt or open act in some jurisdictions. This rule was enacted in the law of England (see the Treason Act 1547), and was later adopted by the United States in Article III, Section 3 of the United States Constitution, which provides that "No Person shall be convicted of Treason unless on the Testimony of two Witnesses to the same overt Act, or on Confession in open Court." In Cramer v. United States, the Supreme Court ruled that "every act, movement, deed, and word of the defendant charged to constitute treason must be supported by the testimony of two witnesses." In Haupt v. United States (330 U.S. 631), however, the Supreme Court found that two witnesses are not required either to prove intent or to prove that an overt act is treasonable. The two witnesses, according to that decision, are required to prove only that the overt act occurred.

In some jurisdictions, a defendant cannot be convicted of criminal conspiracy unless an overt act is proved.
