= List of United States Supreme Court cases, volume 8 =

Supreme Court of the United States
- Interactive map of Supreme Court of the United States
- 38°53′26″N 77°00′16″W
- Established: March 4, 1789; 237 years ago
- Location: Washington, D.C.
- Coordinates: 38°53′26″N 77°00′16″W
- Composition method: Presidential nomination with Senate confirmation
- Authorised by: Constitution of the United States, Art. III, § 1
- Judge term length: life tenure, subject to impeachment and removal
- Number of positions: 9 (by statute)
- Website: supremecourt.gov

This is a list of cases reported in volume 8 (4 Cranch) of United States Reports, decided by the Supreme Court of the United States in 1807 and 1808.

== Nominative reports ==
In 1874, the U.S. government created the United States Reports, and retroactively numbered older privately published case reports as part of the new series. As a result, cases appearing in volumes 1–90 of U.S. Reports have dual citation forms; one for the volume number of U.S. Reports, and one for the volume number of the reports named for the relevant reporter of decisions (these are called "nominative reports").

=== William Cranch ===
Starting with the 5th volume of U.S. Reports, the Reporter of Decisions of the Supreme Court of the United States was William Cranch. Cranch was Reporter of Decisions from 1801 to 1815, covering volumes 5 through 13 of United States Reports which correspond to volumes 1 through 9 of his Cranch's Reports. As such, the complete citation to, for example, Jennings v. Carson is 8 U.S. (4 Cranch) 2 (1807).

== Justices of the Supreme Court at the time of 8 U.S. (4 Cranch) ==
The Supreme Court is established by Article III, Section 1 of the Constitution of the United States, which says: "The judicial Power of the United States, shall be vested in one supreme Court . . .". The size of the Court is not specified; the Constitution leaves it to Congress to set the number of justices. Under the Judiciary Act of 1789 Congress originally fixed the number of justices at six (one chief justice and five associate justices). Since 1789 Congress has varied the size of the Court from six to seven, nine, ten, and back to nine justices (always including one chief justice).

When the cases in 8 U.S. (4 Cranch) were decided, the Court comprised these seven justices:

Portrait	Justice	Office	Home State	Succeeded	Date confirmed by the Senate (Vote)	Tenure on Supreme Court
	John Marshall	Chief Justice	Virginia	Oliver Ellsworth	January 27, 1801 (Acclamation)	February 4, 1801 – July 6, 1835 (Died)
	William Cushing	Associate Justice	Massachusetts	original seat established	September 26, 1789 (Acclamation)	February 2, 1790 – September 13, 1810 (Died)
	Samuel Chase	Associate Justice	Maryland	John Blair, Jr.	January 27, 1796 (Acclamation)	February 4, 1796 – June 19, 1811 (Died)
	Bushrod Washington	Associate Justice	Virginia	James Wilson	December 20, 1798 (Acclamation)	November 9, 1798 (Recess Appointment) – November 26, 1829 (Died)
	William Johnson	Associate Justice	South Carolina	Alfred Moore	March 24, 1804 (Acclamation)	May 7, 1804 – August 4, 1834 (Died)
	Henry Brockholst Livingston	Associate Justice	New York	William Paterson	December 17, 1806 (Acclamation)	January 20, 1807 – March 18, 1823 (Died)
	Thomas Todd	Associate Justice	Kentucky	new seat	March 2, 1807 (Acclamation)	March 3, 1807 – February 7, 1826 (Died)

== Notable cases in 8 U.S. (4 Cranch) ==
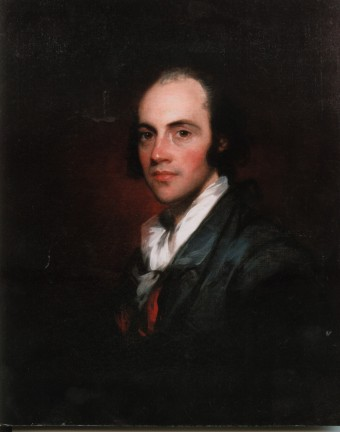
Aaron Burr, c. 1793

=== Ex parte Bollman ===
In Ex parte Bollman, 8 U.S. (4 Cranch) 75 (1807) the Supreme Court held that the constitutional definition of treason excluded mere conspiracy to levy war against the United States. Erick Bollman and Samuel Swartwout were civilians who became implicated in the Burr-Wilkinson Plot. This plot supposedly consisted of Aaron Burr and James Wilkinson attempting to create an empire in the United States, ruled by Burr. In 1806, Wilkinson informed Thomas Jefferson of the plot, ending whatever may have actually been planned. Bollman and Swartwout attempted to recruit others into the plot, but these individuals informed the military, which promptly arrested them. The Court decided that "To constitute a levying of war, there must be an assemblage of persons for the purpose of effecting by force a treasonable purpose. Enlistments of men to serve against government is not sufficient."

== Citation style ==
Under the Judiciary Act of 1789 the federal court structure at the time comprised District Courts, which had general trial jurisdiction; Circuit Courts, which had mixed trial and appellate (from the US District Courts) jurisdiction; and the United States Supreme Court, which had appellate jurisdiction over the federal District and Circuit courts—and for certain issues over state courts. The Supreme Court also had limited original jurisdiction (i.e., in which cases could be filed directly with the Supreme Court without first having been heard by a lower federal or state court). There were one or more federal District Courts and/or Circuit Courts in each state, territory, or other geographical region.

Bluebook citation style is used for case names, citations, and jurisdictions.

- "C.C.D." = United States Circuit Court for the District of . . .
  - e.g.,"C.C.D.N.J." = United States Circuit Court for the District of New Jersey
- "D." = United States District Court for the District of . . .
  - e.g.,"D. Mass." = United States District Court for the District of Massachusetts
- "E." = Eastern; "M." = Middle; "N." = Northern; "S." = Southern; "W." = Western
  - e.g.,"C.C.S.D.N.Y." = United States Circuit Court for the Southern District of New York
  - e.g.,"M.D. Ala." = United States District Court for the Middle District of Alabama
- "Ct. Cl." = United States Court of Claims
- The abbreviation of a state's name alone indicates the highest appellate court in that state's judiciary at the time.
  - e.g.,"Pa." = Supreme Court of Pennsylvania
  - e.g.,"Me." = Supreme Judicial Court of Maine

== List of cases in 8 U.S. (4 Cranch) ==
Case Name	Page and year	Opinion of the Court	Concurring opinion(s)	Dissenting opinion(s)	Lower Court	Disposition
United States v. Kid	1 (1807)	per curiam	none	none	C.C.D. Pa.	certification
Jennings v. Carson	2 (1807)	Marshall	none	none	C.C.D. Pa.	affirmed
Rhinelander v. Insurance Company	29 (1807)	Marshall	none	none	C.C.D. Pa.	certification
Montalet v. Murray	46 (1807)	Marshall	none	none	C.C.D. Ga.	certification
United States v. Willings	48 (1807)	Marshall	none	none	C.C.D. Pa.	affirmed
O'Neale v. Long	60 (1807)	Marshall	none	none	C.C.D.C.	reversed
Smith v. Carrington	62 (1807)	Marshall	none	none	C.C.D.R.I.	reversed
Pendleton v. Wambersie	73 (1807)	per curiam	none	none	C.C.D. Ga.	reversed
Ex parte Bollman	75 (1807)	Marshall	Chase	Johnson	C.C.D.C.	habeas corpus granted
Skillern's Executors v. May's Executors	137 (1807)	per curiam	none	none	D. Ky.	reversed
French's Executrix v. Bank of Columbia	141 (1807)	Marshall	none	none	C.C.D.C.	reversed
Hopkirk v. Bell	164 (1807)	per curiam	none	none	C.C.D. Va.	certification
Hicks v. Rogers	165 (1807)	per curiam	none	none	C.C.D. Vt.	certification
United States v. Cantrill	167 (1807)	Marshall	none	none	C.C.D. Ga.	judgment arrested
Sthreshley v. United States	169 (1807)	Marshall	none	none	D. Ky.	reversed
Marshall v. Currie	172 (1807)	Johnson	none	none	D. Ky.	reversed
Viers v. Montgomery	177 (1807)	per curiam	none	none	D. Ky.	reversed
Diggs v. Wolcott	179 (1807)	per curiam	none	none	C.C.D. Conn.	reversed
Wood v. Lide	180 (1807)	Marshall	none	none	C.C.D. Ga.	affirmed
Fitzsimmons v. Newport Insurance Company	185 (1808)	Marshall	none	none	C.C.D.R.I.	reversed
Marshall v. Delaware Insurance Company	202 (1808)	Marshall	none	none	C.C.D. Pa.	affirmed
McIlvaine v. Coxe's Lessee	209 (1808)	Cushing	none	none	C.C.D.N.J.	affirmed
The Brig Union	216 (1808)	Marshall	none	Johnson	C.C.D. Del.	overruled
Pawling v. United States	219 (1808)	Marshall	none	none	D. Ky.	reversed
Grant v. Naylor	224 (1808)	Marshall	none	none	C.C.D. Md.	reversed
Woods v. Young	237 (1808)	per curiam	none	none	C.C.D.C.	affirmed
Young v. Preston	239 (1808)	per curiam	none	none	C.C.D.C.	reversed
Rose v. Himely	241 (1808)	Marshall	Livingston, Johnson	none	C.C.D.S.C.	reversed
Hudson v. Guestier	293 (1808)	Marshall	Johnson	Chase, Livingston	C.C.D.C.	reversed
Alexander v. Harris	299 (1808)	Marshall	none	none	C.C.D.C.	affirmed
Chappedelaine v. Dechenaux	306 (1808)	Marshall	none	none	C.C.D. Ga.	multiple
United States v. Vowell	316 (1808)	per curiam	none	none	D. Ky.	dismissed certification
City of Alexandria v. Patten	317 (1808)	Marshall	none	none	C.C.D.C.	reversed
Dawson's Lessee v. Godfrey	321 (1808)	per curiam	none	none	C.C.D.C.	affirmed
Mountz v. Hodgson	324 (1808)	Marshall	none	none	C.C.D.C.	dismissed certification
The Ship Charles Carter	328 (1808)	Chase	none	none	C.C.D. Va.	affirmed
United States v. Gurney	333 (1808)	Marshall	none	none	C.C.D. Pa.	certification
Peisch v. Ware	347 (1808)	Marshall	none	none	C.C.D. Del.	affirmed
Shearman v. Irvine's Lessee	367 (1808)	Marshall	none	none	C.C.D. Ga.	affirmed
Alexander v. Baltimore Insurance Company	370 (1808)	Marshall	none	none	C.C.D. Md.	affirmed
Morgan v. Callender	370 (1808)	per curiam	none	none	C.C.D. Orleans	dismissed certification
Matthews v. Zane	382 (1808)	Marshall	none	none	Ohio	jurisdiction set
Young v. Bank of Alexandria	384 (1808)	Marshall	none	none	C.C.D.C.	overruled
Spires v. Willison	398 (1808)	Marshall	none	none	D. Ky.	reversed
Ramsay v. Lee	401 (1808)	Marshall	none	none	C.C.D.C.	affirmed
Stead's Executors v. Course	403 (1808)	Marshall	none	none	C.C.D. Ga.	reversed
Higginson v. Mein	415 (1808)	Marshall	none	Livingston	C.C.D. Ga.	reversed
Pollard v. Dwight	421 (1808)	Marshall	none	none	C.C.D. Conn.	reversed
Croudson v. Leonard	434 (1808)	Johnson	Washington	none	C.C.D.C.	reversed
Ex parte Lewis	433 (1808)	per curiam	none	none	C.C.D. Pa.	certification
The Schooner Betsey	443 (1808)	Marshall	none	none	C.C.D.C.	reversed

== See also ==
- certificate of division
