= United States v. United Mine Workers of America =

United States v. United Mine Workers
- Supreme Court of the United States

Argued January 14, 1947 Decided March 6, 1947
- Full case name: United States v. United Mine Workers of America
- Citations: 330 U.S. 258 (more) 67 S. Ct. 677; 91 L. Ed. 884; 1947 U.S. LEXIS 2954; 12 Lab. Cas. (CCH) ¶ 51,239; 19 L.R.R.M. 2346

Case history
- Prior: Cert. to the United States Court of Appeals for the District of Columbia

Holding
- Restraining order and preliminary injunction prohibiting a strike did not violate the Clayton Antitrust Act or the Norris–La Guardia Act.; The trial court was authorized to punish the violation of its orders as criminal contempt.; Fines imposed by the trial court were warranted in the situation.

Court membership
- Chief Justice Fred M. Vinson Associate Justices Hugo Black · Stanley F. Reed; Felix Frankfurter · William O. Douglas; Frank Murphy · Robert H. Jackson; Wiley B. Rutledge · Harold H. Burton

Case opinions
- Plurality: Vinson, joined by Reed, Jackson, Burton
- Concurrence: Frankfurter
- Concur/dissent: Black, joined by Douglas
- Dissent: Murphy
- Dissent: Rutledge

United States v. United Mine Workers of America, 330 U.S. 258 (1947), was a case in which the United States Supreme Court examined whether a trial court acted appropriately when it issued a restraining order to prevent a labor strike organized by coal miners. In an opinion written by Chief Justice Fred M. Vinson, the Court held that a restraining order and preliminary injunction prohibiting a strike did not violate the Clayton Antitrust Act or the Norris–La Guardia Act, that the trial court was authorized to punish the violation of its orders as criminal contempt, and that fines imposed by the trial court were warranted in the situation.
