= United Public Workers v. Mitchell =

- Supreme Court of the United States

Argued December 3, 1945 Reargued October 17, 1946 Decided February 10, 1947
- Full case name: United Public Workers of America (C.I.O.), et al. v. Mitchell, et al.
- Citations: 330 U.S. 75 (more) 67 S. Ct. 556; 91 L. Ed. 754; 1947 U.S. LEXIS 2960

Case history
- Prior: 56 F. Supp. 621 (D.D.C. 1944)

Holding
- Hatch Act of 1939, as amended in 1940, does not violate First, Fifth, Ninth, or Tenth amendments to U.S. Constitution

Court membership
- Chief Justice Fred M. Vinson Associate Justices Hugo Black · Stanley F. Reed; Felix Frankfurter · William O. Douglas; Frank Murphy · Robert H. Jackson; Wiley B. Rutledge · Harold H. Burton

Case opinions
- Plurality: Reed, joined by Vinson, Burton
- Concurrence: Frankfurter
- Concur/dissent: Douglas
- Dissent: Black
- Dissent: Rutledge
- Murphy, Jackson took no part in the consideration or decision of the case.

United Public Workers v. Mitchell, 330 U.S. 75 (1947), is a 4-to-3 ruling by the United States Supreme Court which held that the Hatch Act of 1939, as amended in 1940, does not violate the First, Fifth, Ninth, or Tenth amendments to U.S. Constitution.

== Background ==
At the start of the 20th century, several unions (such as the National Federation of Federal Employees, American Federation of Government Employees, and the United Federal Workers of America) began representing employees working for the federal government of the United States. The leadership of the United Federal Workers of America (UFWA) was leftist. The leadership was militant in its advocacy of the rights of its members and most of the national and local union leadership advocated leftist ideals; associated with left-wing intellectuals, activists, and political people; and supported left-wing organizations. This led many politicians and others to believe the organization was Communist-controlled.

The political leanings of the UWFA led to passage of two pieces of legislation intended to restrict its political activities. In June 1938, Congress passed a rider to appropriations legislation which prevented the federal government from making payments (such as salaries) to any person or organization which advocated the overthrow of the federal government (as many communist organizations at the time proposed). In 1939, Congress passed the Hatch Act of 1939, which restricted political campaign activities by federal employees. A provision of the Hatch Act made it illegal for the federal government to employ anyone who advocated the overthrow of the federal government. The UFWA immediately hired lawyer Lee Pressman to challenge the constitutionality of the Hatch Act. Various individual employees of the federal government, some of whom were members of the United Public Workers of America, sought an injunction against the second sentence of §9(a) of the Hatch Act, and a declaration that the Act was unconstitutional.

On April 25, 1946, the State, County, and Municipal Workers of America (SCMWA) merged with the UFWA to form the United Public Workers of America. Joining the new organization were several local unions which had been expelled from the American Federation of Teachers (AFT) for being communist-dominated. Congress repeatedly investigated the union for violations of the Hatch Act and prohibitions on advocacy of the right to strike. In January 1947, the House of Representatives Committee on Campaign Expenditures reported that it had found evidence that the UPWA (and other unions) had violated the Federal Corrupt Practices Act by failing to report expenditures in support of various political parties and candidates for federal office.

In the 19th century, American courts had established the "doctrine of privilege." This legal doctrine concluded that public employment was a privilege, not a right, and subsequently significant restrictions could be placed on public employees that could not be constitutionally tolerated in the private sector. By the middle of the 20th century, however, the doctrine of privilege had been markedly weakened. Abuse of the privilege had led to widespread corruption; the tolerance of sexual harassment, racism, religious discrimination, and gender discrimination; and workplace abuse (such as forcing employees to buy goods and services from a supervisor, or forcing employees to run errands for the supervisor). The courts were becoming less and less tolerant of the doctrine of privilege.

== Decision ==
A significantly divided Supreme Court upheld the doctrine of privilege and the Hatch Act. Associate Justice Stanley Forman Reed wrote the decision for the majority.

=== Majority holding ===
Justice Reed initially dealt with an issue which arose due to the untimely filing of the appeal, and concluded the Court could hear the case.

On the substantive issues raised, Justice Reed noted that none of the appellants, except George P. Poole, had violated the provisions of the Hatch Act. Since the federal courts do not issue advisory rulings, Reed dismissed the issues raised by all appellants except Poole. Poole, however, had been charged with a violation of the Hatch Act, and an order for his dismissal entered by the government. (He was a ward executive committeeman for a political party, acted as a poll worker on election day, and acted as a paymaster for other poll workers engaged by that political party.)

Poole contended that the Hatch Act violated the Ninth and Tenth amendments to the U.S. Constitution. Justice Reed also asserted (without explanation) that the Hatch Act implicated rights guaranteed by the First Amendment, and by implication the due process protections of the Fifth Amendment as well. Justice Reed found unpersuasive Poole's claim that off-hours political activity was different from such activity conducted during working hours. "The influence of political activity by government employees, if evil in its effects on the service, the employees or people dealing with them, is hardly less so because that activity takes place after hours." Reed next concluded that no rights guaranteed by the Constitution are absolute, and that all rights "are subject to the elemental need for order without which the guarantees of civil rights to others would be a mockery." But how should the rights of the Ninth and Tenth amendments be balanced against those of the First and Fifth? Justice Reed found the majority's answer in the fact that the Ninth and Tenth amendments are reserved, rather than enumerated powers, and so carry less weight than enumerated powers. He wrote:

The powers granted by the Constitution to the Federal Government are subtracted from the totality of sovereignty originally in the states and the people. Therefore, when objection is made that the exercise of a federal power infringes upon rights reserved by the Ninth and Tenth Amendments, the inquiry must be directed toward the granted power under which the action of the Union was taken. If granted power is found, necessarily the objection of invasion of those rights, reserved by the Ninth and Tenth Amendments, must fail.

Justice Reed then used a traditional balancing test to weight the infringement of First and Fifth amendment rights against "a congressional enactment to protect a democratic society against the supposed evil of political partisanship by classified employees of government." That balance had been decided previously by the Court in Ex parte Curtis, 106 U.S. 371 (1882), and the infringements upheld. Without providing evidence or explanation, Reed asserted that the dangers posed by partisan political activity have only worsened since Curtis. Justice Reed next applied the balancing test to the doctrine of privilege. Reed noted that in United States v. Wurzbach, 280 U.S. 396 (1930), the Court had upheld the doctrine of privilege in a single sentence against rights guaranteed by the Constitution.

Poole had argued that his actions were nonpartisan, however. The majority concluded that since Congress had seen fit to find danger in even nonpartisan political activity by federal workers, the Court would not dispute it. Reed note: "[Such restrictions have] the approval of long practice by the Commission, court decisions upon similar problems and a large body of informed public opinion. Congress and the administrative agencies have authority over the discipline and efficiency of the public service. When actions of civil servants in the judgment of Congress menace the integrity and the competency of the service, legislation to forestall such danger and adequate to maintain its usefulness is required. The Hatch Act is the answer of Congress to this need. We cannot say with such a background that these restrictions are unconstitutional."

The constitutionality of the Hatch Act was upheld, and the judgment of the district court affirmed.

=== Frankfurter's concurrence ===
Justice Felix Frankfurter concluded that the Supreme Court should not have accepted the case, as the appeal had been untimely filed. Compelled to accept jurisdiction, however, by the majority, he concurred with the majority's reasoning on the substantive issues.

=== Black's dissent ===
Justice Hugo Black noted that the §9 of the statute made it illegal for federal workers to engage in political activity, and yet explicitly protected the right of workers to "express their opinions on all political subjects and candidates." Black also refused to accept the conclusions to be drawn from the doctrine of privilege: "Had this measure deprived five million farmers or a million businessmen of all right to participate in elections, because Congress thought that federal farm or business subsidies might prompt some of them to exercise, or be susceptible to, a corrupting influence on politics or government, I would not sustain such an Act on the ground that it could be interpreted so as to apply only to some of them." Black concluded that, on its face, the Hatch Act and implementing civil service regulations were unconstitutionally overbroad (a fact even the government had admitted in its brief, Black said).

Black provided a ringing defense of the right to freedom of speech. He dismissed out of hand the majority's reliance on Ex parte Curtis and United States v. Wurzbach (concluding that they did not support the conclusions the majority came to), and argued that corruption could be dealt with without resorting to the "muzzling" of six million people.

=== Rutledge's dissent ===
Justice Wiley Blount Rutledge concurred with Justice Black's dissent regarding Poole. He concurred with the majority that the case was not ripe regarding the other appellants.

=== Douglas' dissent ===
Justice William O. Douglas took issue with the majority on two grounds. First, he would not have dismissed the claims of the 12 other appellants as unripe, arguing that consideration of a declaratory judgment in the case would be proper. Second, Douglas argued that Poole's position as an industrial worker at the Bureau of Engraving and Printing was an important distinction. Administrative and political personnel may be susceptible to pressure and corruption via political activity, Douglas wrote, but industrial workers are "as remote from contact with the public or from policy making or from the functioning of the administrative process as a charwoman." Douglas concurred with Justice Black's dissent that the Hatch Act was overbroad in its application and approach to the problem of corruption.

== Assessment ==
United Public Workers v. Mitchell was the last time the Supreme Court expansively applied the doctrine of privilege. The Supreme Court largely rejected the doctrine in Wieman v. Updegraff, 344 U.S. 183 (1952), and a number of high court decisions in areas such as nonpartisan speech, due process, search and seizure, the right to marry, the right to bear children, equal protection, education, and receipt of public benefits over the next two decades continued to undermine the concept. Although the Supreme Court later reaffirmed United Public Workers v. Mitchell in 1973 in United States Civil Service Commission v. National Association of Letter Carriers, 413 U.S. 548 (1973), it did so narrowly on the grounds that permitting public employees to engage in political activity was dangerous.

United Public Workers v. Mitchell is one of only seven Supreme Court decisions which addressed the Ninth or Tenth amendments prior to 1965. It is the only one to do so in a substantive way.

Legal commentators have taken issues with the decision's characterization of the Ninth and Tenth amendments. One scholar has characterized the two amendments as a way to "reserve sovereign power rather than recogniz[e] any particular individual right", and as a means of emphasizing that the federal government's powers were enumerated, specific, and limited. This perspective leads to a criticism of United Public Workers v. Mitchell for seeing the amendments as subordinate to the enumerated powers in the Constitution. Another legal scholar has criticized Justice Reed's conception of the Ninth and Tenth amendments as "dubious" because: 1) It equates the meaning of the Ninth with the Tenth (which is clearly incorrect); 2) It leaves the two amendments completely subordinate to all enumerated powers and therefore meaningless; 3) It creates a situation where the Ninth Amendment interprets the Tenth Amendment, strengthening the Tenth Amendment and eviscerating Justice Reed's conclusion that the two amendments are subordinate.

It may also be that the decision is in direct conflict with the intent of the Founding Fathers. In 1841, Secretary of State Daniel Webster, in a directive to heads of the federal agencies condemning the use of civil servants to political advantage, warned:

It is not intended that any officer shall be restrained in the free and proper expression and maintenance of his opinions respecting public men or public measures, or in the exercise to the fullest degree of the constitutional right of suffrage. But persons employed under the Government and paid for their services out of the public Treasury are not expected to take an active or officious part in attempts to influence the minds or votes of others, such conduct being deemed inconsistent with the spirit of the Constitution and the duties of public agents acting under it; and the President is resolved, so far as depends upon him, that while the exercise of the elective franchise by the people shall be free from undue influences of official station and authority, opinion shall also be free among the officers and agents of the Government.

One legal scholar has concluded that congressional debate in 1791 supports Webster's opinion, not the decision by Justice Reed in United Public Workers.

== See also ==
- List of United States Supreme Court cases, volume 330
- Oklahoma v. United States Civil Service Commission, 330 U.S. 127 (1947) (decided concurrently)

== Bibliography ==
- Arnesen, Eric. "United Federal Workers of America/United Public Workers of America." In Encyclopedia of U.S. Labor and Working-Class History. New York: Routledge, 2006.
- Barnett, Randy E. "Reconceiving the Ninth Amendment." Cornell Law Review. 74:1 (November 1988).
- Caplan, Russell L. "The History and Meaning of the Ninth Amendment." Virginia Law Review. 69:223 (March 1983).
- Currie, David P. "President Harrison & the Hatch Act." The Green Bag: An Entertaining Journal of Law. 6:2d 7 (Autumn 2002).
- Gall, Gilbert J. Pursuing Justice: Lee Pressman, the New Deal, and the CIO. Albany, N.Y.: State University of New York Press, 1999.
- Goldstein, Robert Justin, Political Repression in Modern America (University of Illinois Press, 1978, 2001).
- Lyons, John F. Teachers and Reform: Chicago Public Education, 1929-1970. Urbana, Ill.: University of Illinois Press, 2008.
- Matheson, Cameron. "The Once and Future Ninth Amendment." Boston College Law Review. 38:179 (December 1996).
- McAffee, Thomas B. "The Original Meaning of the Ninth Amendment." Columbia Law Review. 90:1215 (June 1990).
- Menez, Joseph Francis; Vile, John R.; and Bartholomew, Paul Charles. Summaries of Leading Cases on the Constitution. Lanham, Md.: Rowman & Littlefield, 2003.
- Moore, Wayne D. Constitutional Rights and Powers of the People. Princeton, N.J.: Princeton University Press, 1996.
- "New Union Urges Wider Labor Law." New York Times. April 26, 1946.
- Rabin, Jack; Hildreth, W. Bartley; and Miller, Gerald J., eds. Handbook of Public Administration. 3d ed. Washington, D.C.: CRC Press, 2006.
- Rosenbloom, David and O'Leary, Rosemary. Public Administration and Law. 2d ed. Washington, D.C.: CRC Press, 1996.
- Sanders, Chase J. "Ninth Life: An Interpretive Theory of the Ninth Amendment." Indiana Law Journal. 69:759 (Summer 1994).
- Spero, Sterling D. and Blum, Albert A. Government As Employer. Carbondale, Ill.: Southern Illinois University Press, 1972.
- "Voting Inquiry Hits 60 Unions, 11 Firms." New York Times. January 3, 1947.
- Yoo, John Choon. "Our Declaratory Ninth Amendment." Emory Law Journal. 42:967 (Fall 1993).
