= Ex parte Bollman, and Ex parte Swartwout =

Ex parte Bollman
- Supreme Court of the United States

Decided February 20, 1807
- Full case name: Ex parte Erick Bollman and Ex parte Samuel Swartwout
- Citations: 8 U.S. 75 (more) 4 Cranch 75; 2 L. Ed. 554; 1807 U.S. LEXIS 369

Case history
- Prior: United States v. Bollman, 24 F. Cas. 1189 (C.C.D.C. 1807) (No. 14,622)
- Subsequent: None

Holding
- The petitioners' alleged conspiracy did not rise to the level of treason as defined by the Constitution.

Court membership
- Chief Justice John Marshall Associate Justices William Cushing · Samuel Chase; Bushrod Washington · William Johnson; H. Brockholst Livingston

Case opinions
- Majority: Marshall, joined by Cushing, Chase, Washington, Livingston
- Dissent: Johnson

Laws applied
- U.S. Const. art. I, III, amends. IV, VI; Judiciary Act of 1789

Ex parte Bollman, 8 U.S. (4 Cranch) 75 (1807), was a case brought before the United States Supreme Court. Bollman held that the constitutional definition of treason excluded mere conspiracy to levy war against the United States. The Supreme Court decided that "To constitute a levying of war, there must be an assemblage of persons for the purpose of effecting by force a treasonable purpose. Enlistments of men to serve against government is not sufficient."

== Background ==
Erick Bollman and Samuel Swartwout were civilians who became implicated in the Burr-Wilkinson Plot. This plot supposedly consisted of Aaron Burr and James Wilkinson attempting to create an empire in the United States, ruled by Burr. In 1806, Wilkinson informed President Thomas Jefferson of the plot, ending whatever may have actually been planned. Bollman and Swartwout attempted to recruit others into the plot, but these individuals informed the military, which promptly arrested them.

== Opinion ==
The Court first repudiated any jurisdiction for habeas not defined by statute or the Constitution of the United States: "[T]he power to award the writ by any courts of the United States, must be given by written law".

The Court found that the Judiciary Act, specifically section 14, was a substantive grant of the power to issue writs. The question the court answers is whether the statutory grant of power is limited to writs of habeas corpus that are "necessary to enable the courts of the United States to exercise their respective jurisdictions in some cause which they are capable of finally deciding".

Section 14 says justices of the supreme court and judges of the district courts "shall have power to grant writs of habeas corpus, for the purpose of an inquiry into the cause of commitment".

The Court cites William Blackstone to explain the function of different common law writs of habeas which are useless in the United States:

1. Habeas corpus ad respondendum: Used to initiate a cause of action against someone confined by an inferior court. Marshall says it is "perfectly useless" against confinement by the United States because he would already be "confined under the process of this court." He says "state courts...are not inferior courts because they emanate from a different authority, and are the creatures of a different government" so it could not be used when a person was "confined by process from a state court" either.
2. Habeas corpus ad satisfaciendum: "This case can never occur in the United States, One court never awards execution on the judgment of another. Our whole juridicial system forbids it."
3. The writ of habeas cum causa is not what is meant by the Judiciary Act, the Court explains, because the Judiciary Act provides an alternate procedure for "bringing into the courts of the United States suits brought in a state court against a person having a right to claim the jurisdiction of the courts of the United States.

Concluding that the "general grant of power" is not limited to an exercise of jurisdiction in "causes which [the court] is enabled to decide finally", Marshall explains: "The only power then, which on this limited construction would be granted by the section under consideration, would be that of issuing writs of habeas corpus ad testificandum. The section itself proves that this was not the intention of the legislature."

== See also ==
- Cramer v. United States: a later treason case before the high court.
- List of United States Supreme Court cases, volume 8
