= Kotch v. Board of River Port Pilot Commissioners =

- Supreme Court of the United States

Decided March 31, 1947
- Full case name: Kotch v. Board of River Port Pilot Commissioners
- Citations: 330 U.S. 552 (more)

Holding
- A preference for nepotism is an acceptable rational basis for a state policy.

Court membership
- Chief Justice Fred M. Vinson Associate Justices Hugo Black · Stanley F. Reed; Felix Frankfurter · William O. Douglas; Frank Murphy · Robert H. Jackson; Wiley B. Rutledge · Harold H. Burton

Case opinions
- Majority: Black
- Dissent: Rutledge, joined by Reed, Douglas, Murphy

Laws applied
- Equal Protection Clause

Kotch v. Board of River Port Pilot Commissioners, 330 U.S. 552 (1947), was a United States Supreme Court case in which the Court held that a preference for nepotism is an acceptable rational basis for a state policy. Kotch was a foundational case for the development of rational basis review.

== Description ==
To become a river pilot in Louisiana, a candidate needed to be appointed by the governor, who appointed only people certified by the State Board of River Pilot Commissioners, who were all pilots. To be certified, a candidate needed to complete a six-month apprenticeship under current pilots. In practice, the Commissioners almost exclusively chose relatives and friends to be apprentices. The plaintiffs in this case sued over the exclusionary policy, saying it violated the Equal Protection Clause.

The Supreme Court upheld the policy, saying it withstood rational basis review. Although nepotism was "a subject of controversy," states that had wanted to prohibit its use in public policy had banned the practice with laws or constitutional amendments. Louisiana had not done so, so the court "[could] only assume that the Louisiana legislature weighed the obvious possibility of evil against whatever useful function a closely knit pilotage system may [have] serve[d]."

In dissent, Justice Rutledge objected to the fact that "Blood [was], in effect, made the crux of the selection." He said, "That is not a test; it is a wholly arbitrary exercise of power."
