= Wieman v. Updegraff =

- Supreme Court of the United States

Argued October 16, 1952 Decided December 15, 1952
- Full case name: Wieman et al. v. Updegraff et al.
- Citations: 344 U.S. 183 (more) 73 S.Ct. 215; 97 L. Ed. 216; 1952 U.S. LEXIS 1430

Case history
- Prior: On appeal from the Supreme Court of Oklahoma

Holding
- Oklahoma loyalty oath legislation violated the due process clause of the Fourteenth Amendment to the United States Constitution

Court membership
- Chief Justice Fred M. Vinson Associate Justices Hugo Black · Stanley F. Reed; Felix Frankfurter · William O. Douglas; Robert H. Jackson · Harold H. Burton; Tom C. Clark · Sherman Minton

Case opinions
- Majority: Clark, joined by Vinson, Black, Reed, Frankfurter, Douglas, Minton
- Concurrence: Black, joined by Douglas
- Concurrence: Frankfurter, joined by Douglas
- Concurrence: Burton
- Jackson took no part in the consideration or decision of the case.

Wieman v. Updegraff, 344 U.S. 183 (1952), is a unanimous ruling by the United States Supreme Court which held that Oklahoma loyalty oath legislation violated the due process clause of the Fourteenth Amendment to the United States Constitution because it did not give individuals the opportunity to abjure membership in subversive organizations. Due process requires that individuals have scienter (knowledge that their membership or support violates the loyalty oath), and the Oklahoma statute did not accommodate this requirement.

== Background ==
In 1950, the state of Oklahoma enacted legislation requiring all state officers and employees to take an oath pledging loyalty to the United States of America, affirming that they did not advocate the violent overthrow of the U.S. government, and denying direct or indirect involvement with or support of any "agency, party, organization, association, or group whatever which has been officially determined by the United States Attorney General or other authorized agency of the United States to be a communist front or subversive organization".

Several faculty and staff at Oklahoma Agricultural and Mechanical College refused to take the oath within the required 30 days after employment. Paul W. Updegraff, an Oklahoma citizen, sued in the District Court of Oklahoma County to prevent the state from paying these individuals their salaries. The faculty and staff members asked to intervene in the suit, and were permitted to do so. They argued that the Act was a bill of attainder; an ex post facto law; made it impossible for them to fulfill their contracts with the state; and violated the due process clause of the Fourteenth Amendment to the United States Constitution.

The district court upheld the Act. The faculty and staff appealed to the Oklahoma Supreme Court. The Oklahoma Supreme Court upheld the Act. The faculty and staff appealed to the U.S. Supreme Court, which granted certiorari.

== Majority opinion ==
Associate Justice Tom C. Clark wrote the opinion for the majority.

Clark accepted the Oklahoma Supreme Court's interpretation that the Act proscribed membership in and support only for those organizations listed on the U.S. Attorney General's list as of the date of enactment. Organizations not on that list, even if communist, were required to be abjured.

Clark argued that the present case must be adjudicated within the context of three recent Supreme Court decisions: Garner v. Board of Public Works, 341 U.S. 716 (1951); Adler v. Board of Education, 342 U.S. 485 (1952); and Gerende v. Board of Supervisors, 341 U.S. 56 (1951). In Garner, the high court rejected the loyalty oath adopted by the city of Los Angeles, California, because it required that the individual have knowledge of all the organizations which might advocate the unlawful violent overthrow of the government. Since no individual could have such knowledge, the act was overturned as vague. The Garner court had remanded the case to the district court with the requirement that the individuals be permitted to take the oath, now that the oath had been interpreted. In Adler, the Court upheld the New York legislation, because the New York courts had already interpreted the law to require that individuals have knowledge of the goals of the organization they belonged to. In Gerende, the Court upheld a Maryland statute on grounds similar to those in Adler.

Justice Clark noted that the Oklahoma Supreme Court had refused to allow the applicants to take the loyalty oath even though it had interpreted the oath anew. Additionally, the appellants had petitioned that court for a rehearing that would allow them to take the oath and again, the Oklahoma Supreme Court denied the request. The act, as interpreted by the Oklahoma Supreme Court (Clark concluded) was asserting that "the fact of membership alone disqualifies. If the rule be expressed as a presumption of disloyalty, it is a conclusive one."

The Oklahoma act could not withstand constitutional scrutiny in that case, Clark wrote: "But membership may be innocent. A state servant may have joined a proscribed organization unaware of its activities and purposes. In recent years, many completely loyal persons have severed organizational ties after learning for the first time of the character of groups to which they had belonged." "Indiscriminate classification of innocent with knowing activity must fall as an assertion of arbitrary power. The oath offends due process."

Clark next dealt with the doctrine of privilege. (This legal doctrine concluded that public employment was a privilege, not a right, and subsequently significant restrictions could be placed on public employees that could not be constitutionally tolerated in the private sector.) Both the Adler Court and the majority in United Public Workers v. Mitchell, 330 U.S. 75 (1947), had upheld statutes on the basis of the doctrine of privilege. Clark distinguished United Public Workers by noting that political corruption was practically a unique case. Additionally, neither Adler nor United Public Workers permitted "patently arbitrary or discriminatory" application of the law (as occurred under the Oklahoma loyalty statute).

Based on these grounds, the majority reversed the Oklahoma Supreme Court and remanded the case. Clark refused to decide the case on other grounds, such as whether the Attorney General had given fair notice to affected organizations or the differing standards employed in the preparation of the list.

=== Black's concurrence ===
Associate Justice Hugo Black concurred, joined by Associate Justice Felix Frankfurter. He also provided a strong defense of free speech:

History indicates that individual liberty is intermittently subjected to extraordinary perils. Even countries dedicated to government by the people are not free from such cyclical dangers. ... Test oaths are notorious tools of tyranny. When used to shackle the mind they are, or at least they should be, unspeakably odious to a free people. Test oaths are made still more dangerous when combined with bills of attainder which like this Oklahoma statute impose pains and penalties for past lawful associations and utterances.... Governments need and have ample power to punish treasonable acts. But it does not follow that they must have a further power to punish thought and speech as distinguished from acts. Our own free society should never forget that laws which stigmatize and penalize thought and speech of the unorthodox have a way of reaching, ensnaring and silencing many more people than at first intended. We must have freedom of speech for all or we will in the long run have it for none but the cringing and the craven. And I cannot too often repeat my belief that the right to speak on matters of public concern must be wholly free or eventually be wholly lost.

=== Frankfurter's concurrence ===
Associate Justice Felix Frankfurter concurred, joined by Associate Justice William O. Douglas. Frankfurter's concurrence provided a ringing defense of the special role teachers play in a democracy:

The process of education has naturally enough been the basis of hope for the perdurance of our democracy on the part of all our great leaders, from Thomas Jefferson onwards. To regard teachers—in our entire educational system, from the primary grades to the university—as the priests of our democracy is therefore not to indulge in hyperbole. It is the special task of teachers to foster those habits of open-mindedness and critical inquiry which alone make for responsible citizens, who, in turn, make possible an enlightened and effective public opinion. Teachers must fulfill their function by precept and practice, by the very atmosphere which they generate; they must be exemplars of open-mindedness and free inquiry. They cannot carry out their noble task if the conditions for the practice of a responsible and critical mind are denied to them.

=== Burton's concurrence ===
Associate Justice Harold Hitz Burton concurred but did not provide a written statement of his concurrence.

== Assessment ==
In the 19th century, American courts had established the "doctrine of privilege."

By the middle of the 20th century, however, the doctrine of privilege had been markedly weakened. Abuse of the privilege had led to widespread corruption; the tolerance of sexual harassment, racism, religious discrimination, and gender discrimination; and workplace abuse (such as forcing employees to buy goods and services from a supervisor, or forcing employees to run errands for the supervisor). The courts were becoming less and less tolerant of the doctrine of privilege.

United Public Workers v. Mitchell marked the end of the doctrine of privilege. The Supreme Court openly rejected the doctrine in Weiman v. Updegraff, and a number of high court decisions in areas such as nonpartisan speech, due process, search and seizure, the right to marry, the right to bear children, equal protection, education, and receipt of public benefits over the next two decades continued to undermine the doctrine. Although the Supreme Court later reaffirmed United Public Workers in 1973 in United States Civil Service Commission v. National Association of Letter Carriers, 413 U.S. 548 (1973), it did so on the very narrow grounds that permitting public employees to engage in political activity encouraged corruption.

== Bibliography ==
- Menez, Joseph Francis; Vile, John R.; and Bartholomew, Paul Charles. Summaries of Leading Cases on the Constitution. Lanham, Md.: Rowman & Littlefield, 2003.
- Rabin, Jack; Hildreth, W. Bartley; and Miller, Gerald J., eds. Handbook of Public Administration. 3d ed. Washington, D.C.: CRC Press, 2006.
- Rosenbloom, David and O'Leary, Rosemary. Public Administration and Law. 2d ed. Washington, D.C.: CRC Press, 1996.
