= Ninth Amendment to the United States Constitution =

1791 amendment on unenumerated rights

The Bill of Rights in the National Archives

The Ninth Amendment (Amendment IX) to the United States Constitution addresses rights, retained by the people, that are not specifically enumerated in the Constitution. It is part of the Bill of Rights. The amendment was introduced during the drafting of the Bill of Rights when some of the American founders became concerned that future generations might argue that, because a certain right was not listed in the Bill of Rights, it did not exist. However, the Ninth Amendment has rarely played any role in U.S. constitutional law, and until the 1980s was often considered "forgotten" or "irrelevant" by many legal academics.

In United Public Workers v. Mitchell (1947), the U.S. Supreme Court held that rights contained in the 9th or 10th amendments could not be used to challenge the exercise of enumerated powers by the government: "If granted power is found, necessarily the objection of invasion of those rights, reserved by the Ninth and Tenth Amendments, must fail."

In Griswold v. Connecticut (1965), the Court held that the 9th and 14th amendments support a right to privacy, which is not enumerated in the Bill of Rights. Justice Arthur Goldberg wrote in his concurrence that the Ninth Amendment was sufficient authority on its own to support the Court's finding of a fundamental right to marital privacy.

== Text ==
The amendment, as proposed by Congress in 1789 and later ratified as the Ninth Amendment, reads as follows:

The enumeration in the Constitution, of certain rights, shall not be construed to deny or disparage others retained by the people.

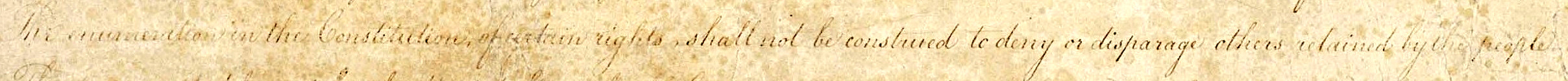
The hand-written copy of the proposed Bill of Rights, 1789, cropped to just show the text that would later be ratified as the Ninth Amendment

== Background before adoption ==
When the U.S. Constitution was put to the states for ratification after being signed on September 17, 1787, the Anti-Federalists argued that a bill of rights should be added. One of the arguments the Federalists gave against the addition of a bill of rights, during the debates about ratification of the Constitution, was that a listing of rights could problematically enlarge the powers specified in Article One, Section 8 of the new Constitution by implication. For example, in Federalist 84, Alexander Hamilton asked, "Why declare that things shall not be done which there is no power to do?" Likewise, James Madison explained to Thomas Jefferson, "I conceive that in a certain degree ... the rights in question are reserved by the manner in which the federal powers are granted" (Note: Madison often expressed this idea, for example in a letter to George Washington dated December 5, 1789: "If a line can be drawn between the powers granted and the rights retained, it would seem to be the same thing, whether the latter be secured by declaring that they shall be abridged, or that the former shall not be extended."Madison 1789b) by Article One, Section 8 of the Constitution.

The Anti-Federalists persisted in favor of a bill of rights during the ratification debates, but also were against ratification, and consequently several of the state ratification conventions gave their assent with accompanying resolutions proposing amendments to be added. In 1788, the Virginia Ratifying Convention attempted to solve the problem that Hamilton and the Federalists had identified by proposing a constitutional amendment specifying "that those clauses which declare that Congress shall not exercise certain powers be not interpreted in any manner whatsoever to extend the powers of Congress."

Like Alexander Hamilton, Madison was concerned that enumerating various rights could "enlarge the powers delegated by the constitution". To attempt to solve this problem, Madison submitted this draft to Congress:

The exceptions here or elsewhere in the constitution, made in favor of particular rights, shall not be so construed as to diminish the just importance of other rights retained by the people; or as to enlarge the powers delegated by the constitution; but either as actual limitations of such powers, or as inserted merely for greater caution.

This was an intermediate form of the Ninth Amendment that borrowed from the Virginia proposal, while foreshadowing the final version.

The First through Eighth Amendments address the means by which the federal government exercises its enumerated powers, while the Ninth Amendment addresses a "great residuum" of rights that have not been "thrown into the hands of the government", as Madison put it. The Ninth Amendment became part of the Constitution on December 15, 1791, upon ratification by three-fourths of the states.

The final form of the amendment ratified by the states is as follows:

The enumeration in the Constitution, of certain rights, shall not be construed to deny or disparage others retained by the people.

== Judicial interpretation ==
The courts have generally not regarded the Ninth Amendment as either limiting governmental power, or justifying its expansion. As the U.S. Supreme Court put it in U.S. Public Workers v. Mitchell 330 U.S. 75 (1947): "If granted power is found, necessarily the objection of invasion of those rights, reserved by the Ninth and Tenth Amendments, must fail."

The Supreme Court held in Barron v. Baltimore (1833) that the Bill of Rights was enforceable by the federal courts only against the federal government, not against the states. Thus, the Ninth Amendment originally applied only to the federal government, which is a government of enumerated powers. The extent to which this was changed by incorporation against the states by the Fourteenth Amendment remains judicially unresolved.

Since Griswold v. Connecticut in 1965, some judges have attempted to use the Ninth Amendment to justify judicially enforcing other unenumerated rights. For example, the District Court that heard the case of Roe v. Wade ruled in favor of a "Ninth Amendment right to choose to have an abortion", although it stressed that the right was "not unqualified or unfettered". However, Justice William O. Douglas rejected that view; Douglas wrote that "The Ninth Amendment obviously does not create federally enforceable rights." Douglas joined the majority opinion of the U.S. Supreme Court in Roe, which stated that a federally enforceable right to privacy, "whether it be founded in the Fourteenth Amendment's concept of personal liberty and restrictions upon state action, as we feel it is, or, as the District Court determined, in the Ninth Amendment's reservation of rights to the people, is broad enough to encompass a woman's decision whether or not to terminate her pregnancy."

The Sixth Circuit Court of Appeals stated in Gibson v. Matthews, that the Ninth Amendment was intended to vitiate the maxim of expressio unius est exclusio alterius according to which the express mention of one thing excludes all others:

[T]he ninth amendment does not confer substantive rights in addition to those conferred by other portions of our governing law. The ninth amendment was added to the Bill of Rights to ensure that the maxim expressio unius est exclusio alterius would not be used at a later time to deny fundamental rights merely because they were not specifically enumerated in the Constitution.

Justice Antonin Scalia expressed the view, in the dissenting opinion of Troxel v. Granville, 530 U.S. 57 (2000), that:

The Declaration of Independence ... is not a legal prescription conferring powers upon the courts; and the Constitution's refusal to "deny or disparage" other rights is far removed from affirming any one of them, and even farther removed from authorizing judges to identify what they might be, and to enforce the judges' list against laws duly enacted by the people.

== Scholarly interpretation ==
In 2000, Harvard historian Bernard Bailyn gave a speech at the White House on the subject of the Ninth Amendment. He said that the Ninth Amendment refers to "a universe of rights, possessed by the people – latent rights, still to be evoked and enacted into law;... a reservoir of other, unenumerated rights that the people retain, which in time may be enacted into law". Similarly, journalist Brian Doherty has argued that the Ninth Amendment "specifically roots the Constitution in a natural rights tradition that says we are born with more rights than any constitution could ever list or specify."

The originalist judicial nominee Robert Bork stated during his Supreme Court confirmation hearing that a judge should not apply a constitutional provision like this one if he does not know what it means; the example Bork then gave was a clause covered by an inkblot. Upon further study, Bork later ascribed a meaning to the Ninth Amendment in his book The Tempting of America. In that book, Bork subscribed to the interpretation of constitutional historian Russell Caplan, who asserted that this Amendment was meant to ensure that the federal Bill of Rights would not affect provisions in state law that restrain state governments.

Randy Barnett, a libertarian originalist, has grouped the competing academic readings of the Ninth Amendment into five models:

1. State law rights: the retained rights are rights conferred by state constitutions and state common law; Barnett attributes this reading to Caplan.
2. Residual rights: the retained rights are whatever remains once the powers granted to the federal government are subtracted, and are thus "defined residually from the powers granted" rather than by their content; this is the interpretation advanced by Thomas B. McAffee.
3. Individual natural rights: they are the natural rights individuals possessed before the Constitution, holding the same status after enumeration as before; this is the interpretation Barnett defends.
4. Collective rights: they are rights held by the people as a collective political body, the paradigm case being the right to alter or abolish their government; this model is associated with Akhil Reed Amar.
5. The federalism model: the amendment protects the retained right of the people of each state to local self-government, making it a companion to the Tenth Amendment rather than a source of individual rights; this is the interpretation developed by Kurt Lash.

Elaborating the individual natural rights model he defends, Barnett has argued that the Ninth Amendment requires what he calls a presumption of liberty. He also argues that the Ninth Amendment prevents the government from invalidating a ruling by either a jury or lower court through strict interpretation of the Bill of Rights. According to Barnett, "The purpose of the Ninth Amendment was to ensure that all individual natural rights had the same stature and force after some of them were enumerated as they had before."

According to former circuit judge Michael W. McConnell,

[T]he rights retained by the people are indeed individual natural rights, but those rights enjoy precisely the same status and are protected in the same way, as before the Bill of Rights was added to the Constitution. They are not relinquished, denied, or disparaged. Nor do natural rights become "constitutional rights." They are simply what all retained rights were before the enactment of the Bill of Rights: a guide to equitable interpretation and a rationale for the narrow construction of statutes that might be thought to infringe them, but not superior to explicit positive law.

According to lawyer and diplomat Frederic Jesup Stimson, the framers of the Constitution and the Ninth Amendment intended that no rights that they already held would be lost through omission. (Note: Stimson wrote: "It was at first believed by our greatest judges and jurists that the whole English Constitution was implied in the Federal Constitution; that there is, as it were, an unwritten Constitution which we inherited in America and which consisted, not only of the English Constitution where not expressly altered by our own but of all matters of natural right and justice. Doubtless, this is the intended meaning of the Ninth Amendment ... Such is not, perhaps, the modern view; but the question has become, in fact, academic, for the reason that in 120 years of interpretation our Supreme Court has ever found some clause in the Federal Constitution into which to read any English constitutional principle not therein expressly altered.") Law professor Charles L. Black, Jr. took a similar position, though Stimson and Black respectively acknowledged that their views differed from the modern view, and differed from the prevalent view in academic writing. (Note: According to Black, "The Academic writing on this amendment seems to me in great part a multidirectional fluttering flight from the Amendment's rather plain meaning".)

Gun rights activists in recent decades have sometimes argued for a fundamental natural right to keep and bear arms in the United States that both predates the U.S. Constitution and is covered by the Constitution's Ninth Amendment; according to this viewpoint, the Second Amendment only enumerates a pre-existing right to keep and bear arms.

== State constitutions ==
Thirty-three states have constitutions that include language virtually identical to the Ninth Amendment. Often called "Baby Ninth Amendments", state courts have often—unlike federal courts and the Ninth Amendment—interpreted these provisions to protect unenumerated rights. Rights state courts have said Baby Ninth Amendments protect include the right to earn a living, the right to open a school, and the right to refuse medical treatment. Alabama and Maine adopted the first "Baby Ninths" in 1819 and the latest state to adopt a new one was Illinois in 1970.

== Sources ==
- Amar, Akhil Reed (1998). The Bill of Rights: Creation and Reconstruction. New Haven: Yale University Press. ISBN 0-300-07379-8.
- Bailyn, Bernard (2000). Remarks at White House Millennium Evening (Speech). Washington, D.C. Archived from the original on February 4, 2017.
- Barnett, Randy E. (2004). Restoring the Lost Constitution: The Presumption of Liberty. Princeton: Princeton University Press.
- Barnett, Randy E. (2006). "The Ninth Amendment: It Means What It Says". Texas Law Review. 85 (1): 1–82.
- Black, Charles L., Jr. (1999). A New Birth of Freedom: Human Rights, Named and Unnamed. New Haven: Yale University Press. ISBN 0-300-07734-3.
- Caplan, Russell L. (1983). "The History and Meaning of the Ninth Amendment". Virginia Law Review. 69: 223.
- Chemerinsky, Erwin (2019). Constitutional Law: Principles and Policies. Aspen Treatise Series (6th ed.). New York: Wolters Kluwer. ISBN 978-1-4548-9574-9.
- Doherty, Brian (2007). Radicals for Capitalism: A Freewheeling History of the Modern American Libertarian Movement. New York: PublicAffairs. ISBN 978-1-58648-350-0.
- Hamilton, Alexander (1788) [28 May 1788]. "Federalist, no. 84". The Founders' Constitution. University of Chicago Press. pp. 575–581.
- Johnson, Nicholas (1992). "Beyond the Second Amendment: An Individual Right to Arms Viewed Through the Ninth Amendment". Rutgers Law Journal. 24: 1.
- Lash, Kurt T. (2004). "The Lost Original Meaning of the Ninth Amendment". Texas Law Review. 83 (2): 331–429. SSRN 613621.
- Madison, James (October 17, 1788). "Letter to Thomas Jefferson". The Founders' Constitution.
- Madison, James (June 8, 1789). "Speech Introducing Bill of Rights". The Founders' Constitution.
- Madison, James (December 5, 1789). "Letter to George Washington". The James Madison Papers. Library of Congress.
- Massey, Calvin R. (1987). "Federalism and Fundamental Rights: The Ninth Amendment". Hastings Law Journal. 38: 305.
- McAffee, Thomas B. (1990). "The Original Meaning of the Ninth Amendment". Columbia Law Review. 90: 1215.
- McConnell, Michael W. (2010). "The Ninth Amendment in Light of Text and History" (PDF). Cato Supreme Court Review. 2009–2010: 13–28.
- National Archives and Records Administration (October 30, 2015). "America's Founding Documents: Bill of Rights Transcript".
- Sanders, Anthony B. (2023). Baby Ninth Amendments: How Americans Embraced Unenumerated Rights and Why It Matters. Ann Arbor: University of Michigan Press. ISBN 978-0-472-05615-6.
- Stimson, Frederic Jesup (2004) [1908]. The Law of the Federal and State Constitutions of the United States; Book One, Origin and Growth of the American Constitutions. Clark, N.J.: Lawbook Exchange. ISBN 1-58477-369-3.
- United States Government Printing Office (2002). "Unenumerated Rights – Ninth Amendment" (PDF). The Constitution of the United States of America: Analysis and Interpretation.
- Virginia Ratifying Convention (June 26, 1788). "Virginia Ratification Resolution". The Avalon Project. Archived from the original on August 30, 2016.

=== Cases ===
- Doe v. Bolton, 410 U.S. 179 (1973).
- Gibson v. Matthews, 926 F.2d 532 (6th Cir. 1991).
- Griswold v. Connecticut, 381 U.S. 479 (1965).
- Jenkins v. Comm'r, 483 F.3d 90 (2d Cir. 2007).
- Roe v. Wade, 314 F. Supp. 1217 (N.D. Tex. 1970).
- Roe v. Wade, 410 U.S. 113 (1973).
- United Pub. Workers v. Mitchell, 330 U.S. 75 (1947).
