= Haupt v. United States =

- Supreme Court of the United States

Argued November 21–22, 1946 Decided March 31, 1947
- Full case name: Hans Max Haupt v. United States
- Citations: 330 U.S. 631 (more)

Case history
- Prior: United States v. Haupt, 152 F.2d 771 (7th Cir. 1946) United States v. Haupt, 136 F.2d 661 (7th Cir. 1943) United States v. Haupt, 47 F. Supp. 836 (N.D. Ill. 1942) United States v. Haupt, 47 F. Supp. 832 (N.D. Ill. 1942)

Holding
- With conviction of the defendant under the current facts was correct, and when a legal basis for a conviction of treason is proved by two witnesses, there is nothing precluding the use of corroborative out-of-court confessions as further evidence.

Court membership
- Chief Justice Fred M. Vinson Associate Justices Hugo Black · Stanley F. Reed; Felix Frankfurter · William O. Douglas; Frank Murphy · Robert H. Jackson; Wiley B. Rutledge · Harold H. Burton

Case opinions
- Majority: Jackson, joined by Vinson, Black, Reed, Frankfurter, Rutledge, Burton
- Concurrence: Douglas
- Dissent: Murphy

Laws applied
- Treason Clause

Haupt v. United States, 330 U.S. 631 (1947), was a Supreme Court case in which the Court affirmed the conviction of Hans Max Haupt—father of Herbert Hans Haupt— for treason, and that after the Constitution's Treason Clause's two witness requirement is satisfied, it does not preclude the prosecution from entering out-of-court confessions into evidence.

== Historical context ==
On September 4, 1942, Hans Max Haupt, along with Erna Emma Haupt, Walter Otto Froehling, Lucille Froehling, Otto Richard Wergin, and Kate Martha Wergin, were indicted by a grand jury in the U.S. District Court for the Northern District of Illinois for treason against the United States.

=== District Court decision ===
The indictment against the defendants alleges that they,

"were to carry out requests and instructions from Herbert Haupt and employ the use of false information in concealing the identity of Herbert Haupt...[and] conceal the property and funds of Herbert Haupt so that he would be able to successfully use the same, and all of these activities engaged in by the defendants were with the knowledge that they were aiding and comforting the enemies of the United States including said Herbert Haupt and the German government." "The overt acts may be briefly described as follows: Harboring and giving sustenance to the enemy; accepting money from the enemy; safeguarding and concealing money belonging to the enemy; harboring Herbert Haupt and concealing him in their respective homes; conferring, counselling and advising the enemy; giving false and misleading information which aided the enemy; permitting meetings to be held in their homes for the purpose of aiding the enemy; transporting and conveying the enemy; procuring and purchasing a vehicle of transportation for the enemy; giving money to the enemy; securing lodging for the enemy; furnishing a mailing address for the enemy; concealing the ownership of money belonging to the enemy and giving false and misleading information to the agents and officials of the United States government."

Haupt himself was accused of three overt acts of treason: sheltering Herbert for six days, purchasing a car to aid in his mission, and helping him to find employment at a factory where the Norden bombsight was being manufactured. In an order by District Judge William J. Campbell, he held that the indictment was in proper order and fulfilled the Constitution's Treason Clause, and denied all of the defendant's demurrers. Of the twenty-nine overt acts alleged, seventeen of them were removed from the indictment and only twelve were considered by the jury.

On November 24, 1942, Judge Campbell found each of the defendants guilty, per the judgement of the jury. He sentenced Erna Max Haupt (Hans' wife), Lucille Froehling, and Kate Martha Wergin to 25 years in prison and imposed a $10,000 fine. He sentenced Haupt, Walter Otto Froehling, and Otto Richard Wergin to death by electric chair, to be carried out on January 22, 1943.

=== Court of Appeals decisions ===
All of the convicted defendants appealed their convictions to the U.S. Court of Appeals for the Seventh Circuit. The circuit court held oral arguments on issues about the indictment, certain statements from the defendants which were admitted into evidence, the court's decision to deny a motion for severance, and the jury instructions made by the court. On July 23 the court released its decision, written by Circuit Judge James E. Major, in which it reversed all of their convictions and ordered a second trial.

A new trial commenced, and Haupt was once again found guilty of treason, to which Judge John P. Barnes sentenced him to life imprisonment and imposed a $10,000 fine. During the second trial, testimony was allowed about out-of-court statements made by Haupt in which he expressed support for Nazi Germany, as well as a confession he allegedly made to fellow prisoners. Haupt appealed once more, and the circuit court released its decision on January 24, 1946. Written by Circuit Judge Evan A. Evans, the court affirmed Haupt's conviction. Circuit Judge Otto Kerner Sr. concurred in the judgement "but not in all that is said in the opinion", and the aforementioned Circuit Judge Major filed a dissenting opinion to both the judgement and the court's decision to deny a rehearing.

Haupt then filed a petition for a writ of certiorari to the Supreme Court.

== Supreme Court decision ==
The Supreme Court granted Haupt's petition, and held oral arguments on November 21 and 22, 1946, and released its opinion on March 31, 1947. Justice Robert H. Jackson writing for a 8-1 court, affirmed the circuit court's decision and upheld Haupt's conviction. On the main issue of whether various out-of-court statements made by Haupt and his associates were admissible, the court states,

"It is also urged that errors were made in admission of evidence. Some of this concerned conversations and occurrences long prior to the indictment which were admitted to prove intent. They consisted of statements showing sympathy with Germany and with Hitler and hostility to the United States. Such testimony is to be scrutinized with care..[b]ut, having found the legal basis for the conviction laid by the testimony of two witnesses, we find nothing in the text or policy of the Constitution to preclude using out-of-court admissions or confessions."

Justice Frank Murphy wrote a dissenting opinion. Murphy argued that Haupt's act of giving his son shelter did not provably rise to the level of an act of treason and, because all three overt acts had been charged as a single count, the indictment was deficient and Haupt's conviction should be overturned.
