= Cramer v. United States =

- Supreme Court of the United States

Argued March 9, 1944 Reargued November 6, 1944 Decided April 23, 1945
- Full case name: Anthony Cramer v. United States
- Citations: 325 U.S. 1 (more) 65 S. Ct. 918; 89 L. Ed. 1441; 1945 U.S. LEXIS 2157

Case history
- Prior: United States v. Cramer, 137 F.2d 888 (2d Cir. 1943); judgement for the plaintiff

Holding
- A conviction for treason must meet the definition given in Article III of the Constitution.

Court membership
- Chief Justice Harlan F. Stone Associate Justices Owen Roberts · Hugo Black; Stanley F. Reed · Felix Frankfurter; William O. Douglas · Frank Murphy; Robert H. Jackson · Wiley B. Rutledge

Case opinions
- Majority: Jackson, joined by Roberts, Frankfurter, Murphy, Rutledge
- Dissent: Douglas, joined by Stone, Black, Reed

Laws applied
- U.S. Const. art. III § 3

Cramer v. United States, 325 U.S. 1 (1945), was a case in which the Supreme Court of the United States reviewed the conviction of Anthony Cramer, a German-born naturalized citizen, for treason.

== Background ==
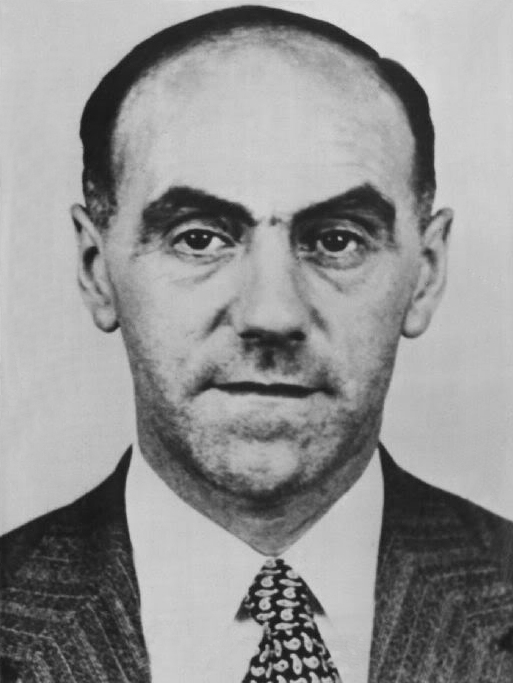
Anthony Cramer in 1942

Anthony Cramer was born in Arnsberg, Germany on October 5, 1900. During World War I, he was conscripted into the Imperial German Army. Cramer moved to the United States in 1925, and was naturalized in 1936. He was a former member of the Friends of New Germany, a pro-Nazi organization based in the United States, which was the predecessor of the German American Bund. Cramer left the organization in 1935, believing it was a scam, and disliking some of their "radical activities". Before the United States entered the war, Cramer had written letters to his friends and family in Europe, sympathizing with the Nazi regime. Before the attack on Pearl Harbor, he'd strongly opposed any kind of participation in the war by the United States against Germany. He expressed concern about the draft, which he said was part of aggression against Germany. Cramer also listened to broadcasts by Nazi propagandists, including William Joyce.

During his time living in the United States, Cramer had associated with two Germans, Werner Thiel and Edward Kerling, one of whom he had prior business dealings with. Thiel, Kerling, and six other Germans, two of whom were dual nationals, were later found to be in the United States for the purpose of sabotage, as part of Operation Pastorius (see Ex parte Quirin). In the aftermath of the failure of that operation, the Germans were tried as saboteurs by a military tribunal. Six of them, including Thiel and Kerling, were executed. Sixteen people, including Cramer, were arrested for aiding the saboteurs. In November 1942, he was convicted of treason by a civilian court on the basis of his association with Thiel and Kerling. Judge Henry W. Goddard sentenced him to 45 years in prison, along with a fine of $10,000. Goddard remarked that he only refrained from imposing a death sentence due to Cramer's lack of full knowledge of the plot.

"I shall not impose the maximum penalty of death. It does not appear that this defendant Cramer was aware that Thiel and Kerling were in possession of explosives or other means for destroying factories and property in the United States or planned to do that. From the evidence it appears that Cramer had no more guilty knowledge of any subversive purposes on the part of Thiel or Kerling than a vague idea that they came here for the purpose of organizing pro-German propaganda and agitation. If there were any proof that they had confided in him what their real purposes were, or that he knew or believed what they really were, I should not hesitate to impose the death penalty."

Cramer appealed his conviction to the Court of Appeals for the Second Circuit, where his conviction was upheld. Appealing to the court of last resort, the Supreme Court, Cramer was granted certiorari on November 8, 1943. The case was originally argued on March 9, 1944; reargued on November 6, 1944; and finally decided on April 23, 1945. Before the Supreme Court, Harold Medina, a future Federal judge, appeared for Cramer, while Solicitor General Charles Fahy defended the actions of the government.

== Opinion ==
The Court decided five-to-four to overturn the jury verdict. Writing for the majority, Justice Robert H. Jackson said that the Constitution is clear in its definition of treason, limited to the waging of war, or giving material assistance to an enemy. The prosecution and its witnesses could demonstrate only an association and not that Cramer had given "Aid and Comfort," as defined in Article Three. Jackson wrote that the jury had been given no evidence that Cramer had "even paid for their drinks." As such, the majority opinion held, the associations were insufficient to convict Cramer for treason, and the judgment of the Court of Appeals was reversed.

Writing in dissent, Justice William O. Douglas claimed that acts, though innocent by nature, may serve a treasonous plan. Chief Justice Harlan Fiske Stone concurred with the dissent.

== Aftermath ==
In 1945, Cramer pleaded guilty to two lesser charges of trading with the enemy. He was sentenced to six years in prison.

== See also ==
- Ex parte Bollman: an earlier treason case before the Court.
