= Oklahoma v. United States Civil Service Commission =

- Supreme Court of the United States

Argued October 17–18, 1946 Decided February 10, 1947
- Full case name: Oklahoma v. United States Civil Service Commission
- Citations: 330 U.S. 127 (more) 67 S. Ct. 544; 91 L. Ed. 794; 1947 U.S. LEXIS 2860

Case history
- Prior: 61 F. Supp. 355 (N.D. Okla. 1945); affirmed, 153 F.2d 280 (10th Cir. 1946); cert. granted, 328 U.S. 831 (1946).

Court membership
- Chief Justice Fred M. Vinson Associate Justices Hugo Black · Stanley F. Reed; Felix Frankfurter · William O. Douglas; Frank Murphy · Robert H. Jackson; Wiley B. Rutledge · Harold H. Burton

Case opinions
- Majority: Reed, joined by Vinson, Douglas, Burton
- Concurrence: Frankfurter
- Dissent: Black, Rutledge
- Murphy and Jackson took no part in the consideration or decision of the case.

Oklahoma v. United States Civil Service Commission, 330 U.S. 127 (1947), is a 5-to-2 ruling by the United States Supreme Court which held that the Hatch Act of 1939 did not violate the Tenth Amendment to the United States Constitution.

== Background ==
The Hatch Act of 1939 barred federal employees from engaging in any political activity, either during working hours or non-working hours.

The Oklahoma State Highway Commission had received funds from an agency of the United States government to build roads and bridges in that state. An employee of the State Highway Commission was also chairman of a committee of a political party. The United States Civil Service Commission ruled the employee's conduct to be in violation of the Hatch Act. The Civil Service Commission asked that the employee be fired. If the employee was not fired, the Civil Service Commission recommended that all federal highway funds be withheld from the state of Oklahoma.

The state of Oklahoma sued to overturn the Civil Service Commission's ruling. The district court upheld the ruling. The appellate court upheld the district court's ruling.

Oklahoma appealed again, and the Supreme Court granted certiorari. The state made four claims:

1. The Hatch Act violates the sovereignty of the states and is an unlawful delegation of power.
2. The Hatch Act applies only to "active" political participation, which the employee did not engage in.
3. Nothing in the Act permits the Civil Service Commission to order the removal of a state officer or apply a penalty to a state.
4. The decisions of the district and appellate courts erred in not permitting the State of Oklahoma to pursue judicial review of the Act's constitutionality.

The federal government contended the state had no standing to sue.

== Opinion of the Court ==
Associate Justice Stanley Forman Reed wrote the decision for the majority. The case was decided concurrently with United Public Workers v. Mitchell, 330 U.S. 75 (1947).

Justice Reed noted that the United States did not raise the issue of standing in a timely fashion. However, he interpreted the government's argument to be that no actual penalty had yet been applied and thus the case was not yet ripe for review. This latter interpretation was not barred because it was raised for the first time before the Supreme Court. Section 12, Subsection (c) of the Act gave the courts jurisdiction over questions of law, which Reed interpreted to mean constitutional questions as well as questions of fact. Thus, the courts had jurisdiction. Reed subsequently engaged in an extensive review of the Court's jurisdiction.

Reed relied heavily on United Public Workers v. Mitchell, decided earlier that day, for his rationale that the Civil Service Commission and Hatch Act had not violated Oklahoma's Tenth Amendment rights.

As for whether the employee's service was active or passive, Reed relied on two facts. First, he deferred to the Civil Service Commission's expertise, which had previously determined that "service on or for" a political committee constituted participation. Second, he relied on the congressional debate during passage of the Act, which clearly indicated that there was no distinction between active and passive participation.

Did the Civil Service Commission have the authority to impose the penalties it did? Reed believed so, and entertained no doubts that the commission had the right to order the employee fired (a right explicitly granted in the Act) even though the employee was a state one.

=== Concurrence ===
Associate Justice Felix Frankfurter concurred in the decision. However, he felt that the government was untimely in raising the issue of Oklahoma's standing to sue. He also believed that the state of Oklahoma lacked standing to challenge the constitutional validity of the Act. But since the majority had held otherwise on both these issues, he concurred in the majority's reasoning regarding the interpretation of law.

=== Dissent ===
Associate Justices Hugo Black and Wiley Blount Rutledge dissented, but wrote no opinion.
