= List of United States Supreme Court cases, volume 330 =

This is a list of all the United States Supreme Court cases from volume 330 of the United States Reports:

Case name	Citation	Date decided
Everson v. Board of Education	330 U.S. 1	1947
Public Workers v. Mitchell	330 U.S. 75	1947
Oklahoma v. United States Civil Service Commission	330 U.S. 127	1947
Walling v. Portland Terminal Co.	330 U.S. 148	1947
Walling v. Nashville, C. & S.L.R.R. Co.	330 U.S. 158	1947
Bozza v. United States	330 U.S. 160	1947
Ute Indians v. United States	330 U.S. 169	1947
Angel v. Bullington	330 U.S. 183	1947
Cone v. West Virginia Pulp & Paper Co.	330 U.S. 212	1947
NLRB v. Donnelly Garment Co.	330 U.S. 219	1947
United States v. Powell	330 U.S. 238	1947
Northern P.R.R. Co. v. United States	330 U.S. 248	1947
United States v. United Mine Workers of America	330 U.S. 258	1947
Testa v. Katt	330 U.S. 386	1947
Carpenters v. United States	330 U.S. 395	1947
Joseph v. Carter & Weekes Stevedoring Co.	330 U.S. 422	1947
American Stevedores, Inc. v. Porello	330 U.S. 446	1947
Aetna Cas. & Sur. Co. v. Flowers	330 U.S. 464	1947
Cardillo v. Liberty Mut. Ins. Co.	330 U.S. 469	1947
Packard Motor Car Co. v. NLRB	330 U.S. 485	1947
Gulf Oil Corp. v. Gilbert	330 U.S. 501	1947
Koster v. (American) Lumbermens Mut. Casualty Co.	330 U.S. 518	1947
Department of Agriculture v. Remund	330 U.S. 539	1947
Walling v. General Industries Co.	330 U.S. 545	1947
Kotch v. Board of River Port Pilot Comm'rs	330 U.S. 552	1947
ICC v. Mechling	330 U.S. 567	1947
Penfield Co. v. SEC	330 U.S. 585	1947
New York ex rel. Halvey v. Halvey	330 U.S. 610	1947
Industrial Comm'n v. McCartin	330 U.S. 622	1947
Haupt v. United States	330 U.S. 631	1947
Levinson v. Spector Motor Serv.	330 U.S. 649	1947
Pyramid Motor Freight Corp. v. Ispass	330 U.S. 695	1947
United States v. Ogilvie Hardware Co.	330 U.S. 709	1947
United States v. Lem Hoy	330 U.S. 724	1947
Land v. Dollar	330 U.S. 731	1947
Bruce's Juices, Inc. v. American Can Co.	330 U.S. 743	1947
Bethlehem Steel Co. v. New York State Labor Relations Bd.	330 U.S. 767	1947
